= II-54 road (Bulgaria) =

Road in Bulgaria

Republic Road I-54
- Републикански път I-54

Route information
- Length: 30.6 km (19.0 mi)

Major junctions
- From: Km 53.5 of I-5, Byala
- To: Km 51.6 of II-52, Vardim

Location
- Country: Bulgaria

Highway system
- Highways in Bulgaria

Republican Road II-54 (Bulgarian: Републикански път II-54) is a 2nd class road in northern Bulgaria, running through the territory of Ruse and Veliko Tarnovo Provinces. Its length is 30.6 km.

The road starts at Km 53.5 of the first class I-5 road in the town of Byala in Ruse Province and heads north along the left bank of the river Yantra in the central Danubian Plain. After passing through the village of Tsenovo it turns in western direction. The road then runs through the villages of Piperkovo and Karamanovo, where it turns northwest, crosses the river Studena, a left tributary of the Yantra, enters Veliko Tarnovo Province and reaches its terminus at Km 51.6 of the second class II-52 road in the eastern part of the village of Vardim.
