= Tsenovo =

Tsenovo (Bulgarian: Ценово, pronounced [ˈt͡sɛnovo]; also transliterated Cenovo or Tzenovo) may refer to two Bulgarian villages:

- Tsenovo, Ruse Province – a village in Tsenovo Municipality, Ruse Province
- Tsenovo, Stara Zagora Province – a village in Chirpan Municipality, Stara Zagora Province
