= II-52 road (Bulgaria) =

Road in Bulgaria

Republic Road I-52
- Републикански път I-52

Route information
- Length: 115 km (71 mi)

Major junctions
- From: Km 11 of I-5,
- To: Km 80.1 of II-34, Nikopol

Location
- Country: Bulgaria

Highway system
- Highways in Bulgaria

Republican Road II-52 (Bulgarian: Републикански път II-52) is a second-class road in northern Bulgaria, running through Ruse, Veliko Tarnovo and Pleven Provinces. Its length is 115 km.

== Route description ==
The road starts at Km 11 of the first class I-5 road at Dolapite Railway Station southwest of the city of Ruse and heads southwest though the eastern section of the Danubian Plain. It passes through the villages of Pirgovo and Mechka, reaching its port on the river Danube. From there, a 23.2 km section though Batin until the village of Krivina the road is not constructed and remains unpaved. From Krivina the II-52 again continues with asphalt pavement, crosses the river Yantra, passes through Novgrad and heads west through the central part of the Danubian Plain, following the right bank of the Danube.

It enters Veliko Tarnovo Province, goes through the village of Vardim and the town of Svishtov and just west of Oresh reaches Pleven Province. There, the road runs through the southern higher reaches of the Svishtov–Belene Plain, passing through the villages of Dekov, Byala Voda, Lozitsa, Lyubenovo and Vabel. It the reaches its terminus at Km 80.1 of the second class II-34 road in the center of the town of Nikopol.
