= Yantra (river) =

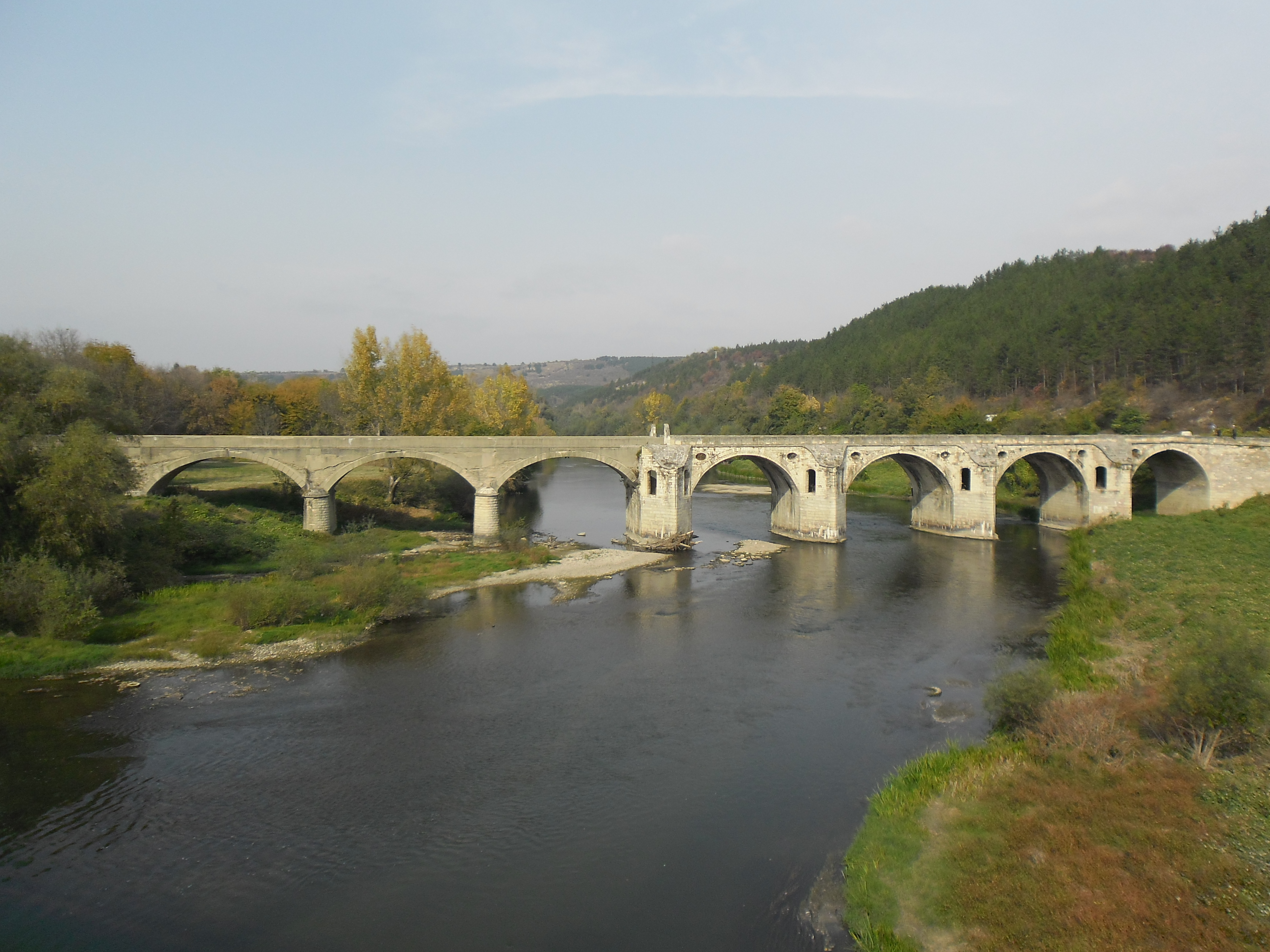
- Byala Bridge over the Yantra

Location
- Country: Bulgaria

Physical characteristics
- Source
  - location: N of Atovo Padalo, Balkan Mountains
  - coordinates: 42°44′20.04″N 25°25′6.96″E
  - elevation: 1,220 m (4,000 ft)
- Mouth
  - location: Danube
  - coordinates: 43°38′26.88″N 25°34′13.08″E
  - elevation: 19 m (62 ft)
- Length: 285 km (177 mi)
- Basin size: 7,862 km^{2} (3,036 sq mi)

Basin features
- Progression: Danube→ Black Sea

The Yantra (/ˈjæntrə/ YAN-trə; Bulgarian: Янтра, romanized: Jantra, IPA: [ˈjantrɐ]) is a river in northern Bulgaria, a right tributary of the Danube. Reaching a length of 285 km, it is the seventh longest river in Bulgaria and the third longest Bulgarian tributary of the Danube. In the middle and lower course, the Yantra takes many turns forming numerous gorges. It has a high sinuosity index of 3.1, which is characteristic for meandering rivers. Its catchment spans a territory of 7,862 km^{2} and has a small mean slope value 4.6‰ with a mean altitude of 470 m.

The city of Veliko Tarnovo, situated on several hills overlooking the river along its middle course, served as the capital of the Second Bulgarian Empire in the 12–14th centuries, and remains an important cultural, economic and tourist center in Bulgaria. Another major city on the river is Gabrovo, an early education and industrial hub of the country.

== Geography ==
=== Course ===
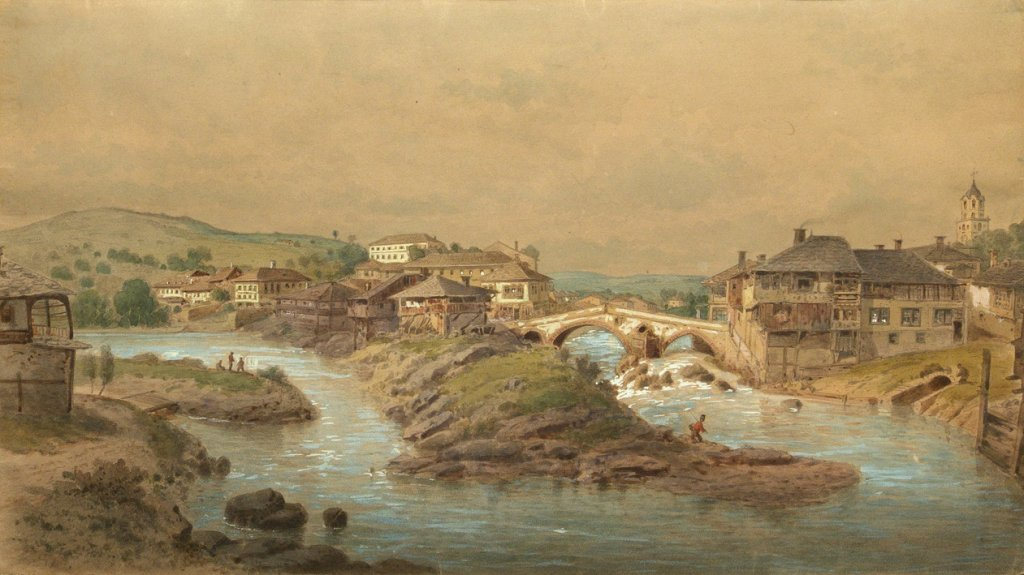
The Yantra at Gabrovo by Felix Philipp Kanitz

The Yantra takes its source at an altitude of 1,220 m on the northern foothills of the summit of Atovo Padalo (1,495 m) in the Shipka division of the Balkan Mountains, very close to the historical summit of Buzludzha (1,432 m). Until the city of Gabrovo it flows northwest in a deep valley covered with forests of European beech (Fagus sylvatica). Between Gabrovo and the village of Yantra the river forms the Strazha Gorge through the homonymous plateau, its valley then widens and arable lands appear along its terraces.

The middle course begins at the village of Vetrintsi, as the river heads east. The Yantra turns northwards before reaching the city of Veliko Tarnovo and forms a picturesque gorge within its urban limits, as it cuts through the Tarnovo Heights. The Yantra exits the gorge at the village of Samovodene and enters the Danubian Plain, forming the boundary between the plain's central and eastern sections until its mouth.

Due to the small gradient of the current in the Danubian Plain — 4.6‰, the Yantra forms large meanders, with a sinuosity index of 3.1 — the largest in the territory of Bulgaria, especially in the area of Dolna Oryahovitsa, Varbitsa and Draganovo. After receiving its largest tributary, the Rositsa, the river heads north, again forming with numerous meanders and abandoned riverbeds. Downstream of the village of Dolna Studena, it turns northwest and enters another picturesque gorge between the villages of Beltsov, Dzhulyunitsa and Novgrad. In its lower course the river's width ranges between 30 and 78 m. The Yantra flows into the Danube at an altitude of 19 m some 1.7 km northwest of the village of Krivina and about 2 km east of the Vardim Island, the third largest Bulgarian Danubian isle.

=== Basin and hydrology ===
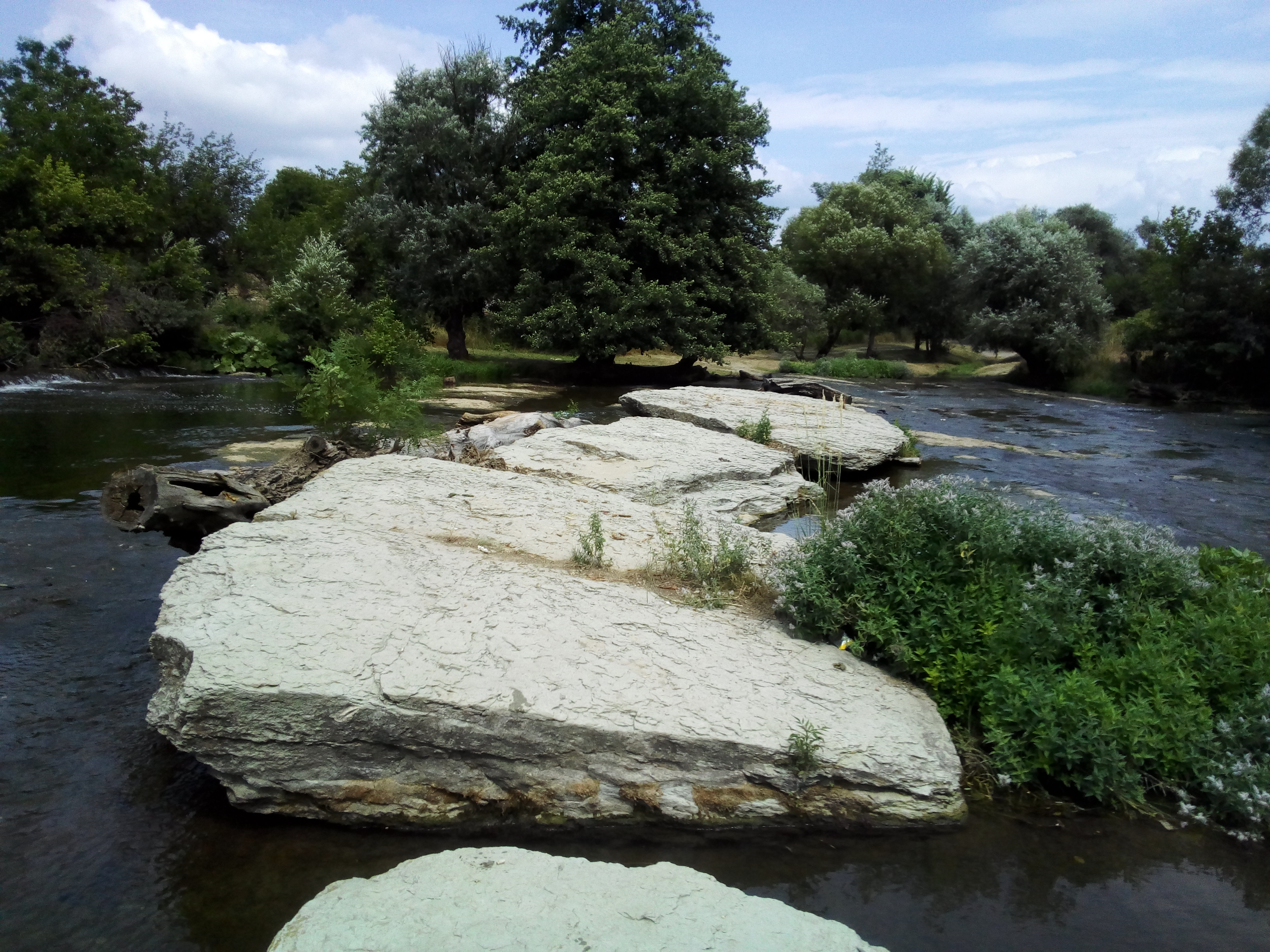
Rocks in the Yantra

The Yantra drainage basin covers a territory of 7,862 km^{2} or 0.96% of the Danube's total and borders the basins of the Osam and the Barata to the west, the Rusenski Lom and the Kamchiya to the east and northeast, and the Tundzha of the Maritsa drainage to the south of the Balkan Mountain's main water divide. Its river basin is the fifth largest in Bulgaria by area, after those of the Maritsa, the Struma, the Iskar and the Tundzha, encompassing the whole Gabrovo Province, 90% of Veliko Tarnovo Province, 40% of Targovishte Province, the southwestern part of Ruse Province, and small areas of Lovech and Sliven Province. In the Balkan Mountains the river basin is covered mainly with deciduous forests. To the north in the fore-Balkan section, the catchment area of the Yantra is well forested and grassed and high-stemmed woods gradually give way to low-stemmed ones. The main tributaries from the source to the mouth are the Belitsa (57 km), the Stara reka (92 km), the Rositsa (164 km), the Eliyska reka (32 km) and the Strudena (45 km). Other major rivers within the Yantra basin include the Golyama reka (75 km), the Veselina (70 km) and the Vidima (68 km).

The Yantra has a mixed feed of snow, rain and karst waters. Snow and rain feed is prevalent in the Balkan Mountains and the fore-Balkan, rain in the Danubian Plain and underground karst water in the fore-Balkan. High water is in March–June in the Balkan Mountains due to the snow melt while in the Danubian Plain it is in January–June; low water is in August–October. During the spring high water comes about 70–80% of the total annual discharge, while during the autumn low water come 9–10%. The average annual discharge is 4 m^{3}/s at Gabrovo, 11.9 m^{3}/s at Veliko Tarnovo, 36.8 m^{3}/s at Karantsi and 47 m^{3}/s at the mouth. Since the Yantra is prone to floods, its lower left bank in the Danubian Plain is protected with dikes.

== Ecology ==
The whole river course is included in the European Union network of nature protection areas Natura 2000 under the code Yantra BG0000610 A total of 64 fish species have been recorded from the Yantra, of them 55 are autochthonous. Many of the local fishes are of conservation importance and are protected, including Kessler's gudgeon, Danubian longbarbel gudgeon, Danube whitefin gudgeon, spined loach, Balkan golden loach, Balon's ruffe, striped ruffe, weatherfish, Balkan loach, Danube streber, zingel, European bitterling, asp, sabrefish, Romanian barbel, Ukrainian brook lamprey, etc. Four of the six goby species found in the Bulgarian section of the Danube also occur in the Yantra — monkey goby, round goby, racer goby and tubenose goby.

== Settlements and economy ==
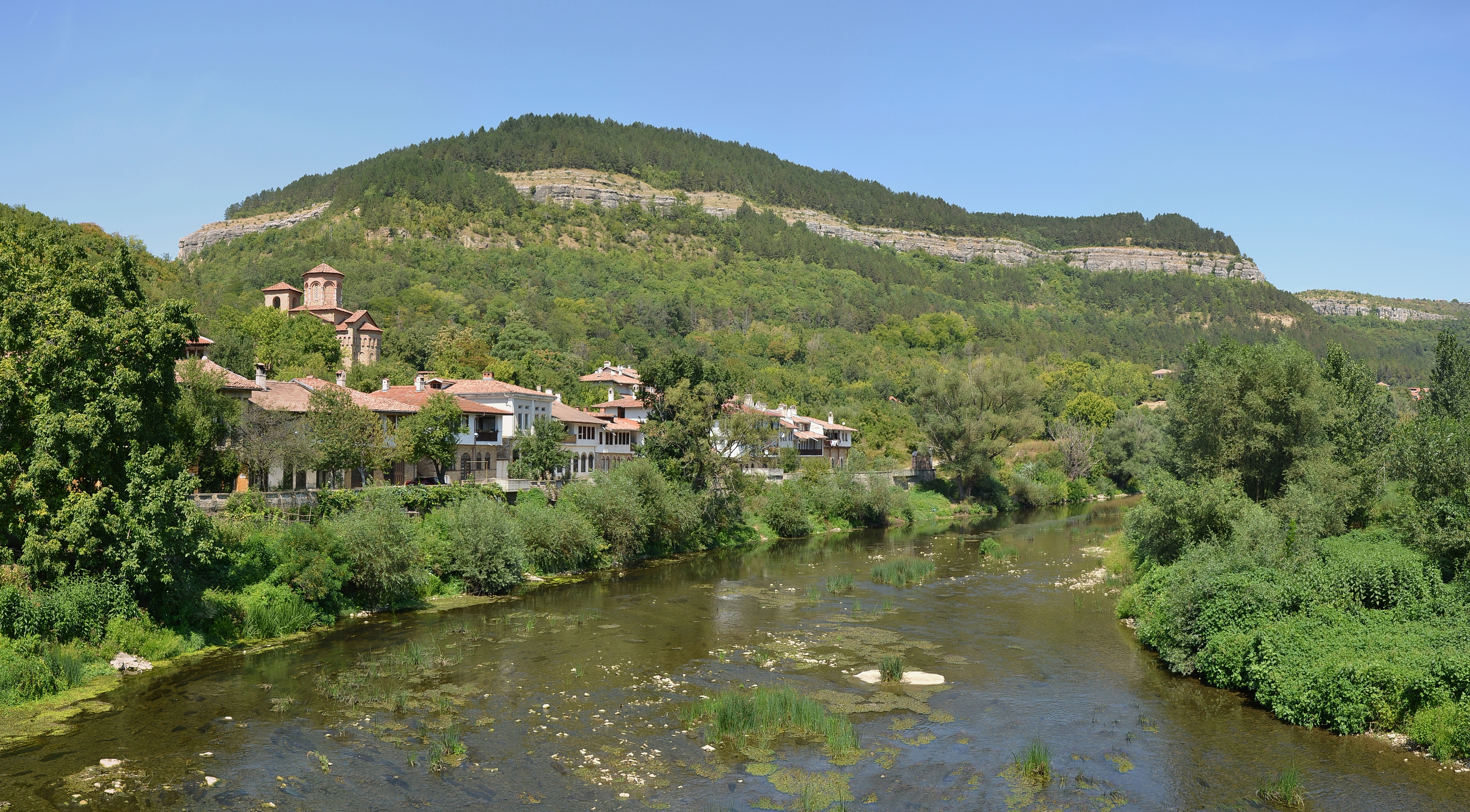
The Yantra at Veliko Tarnovo

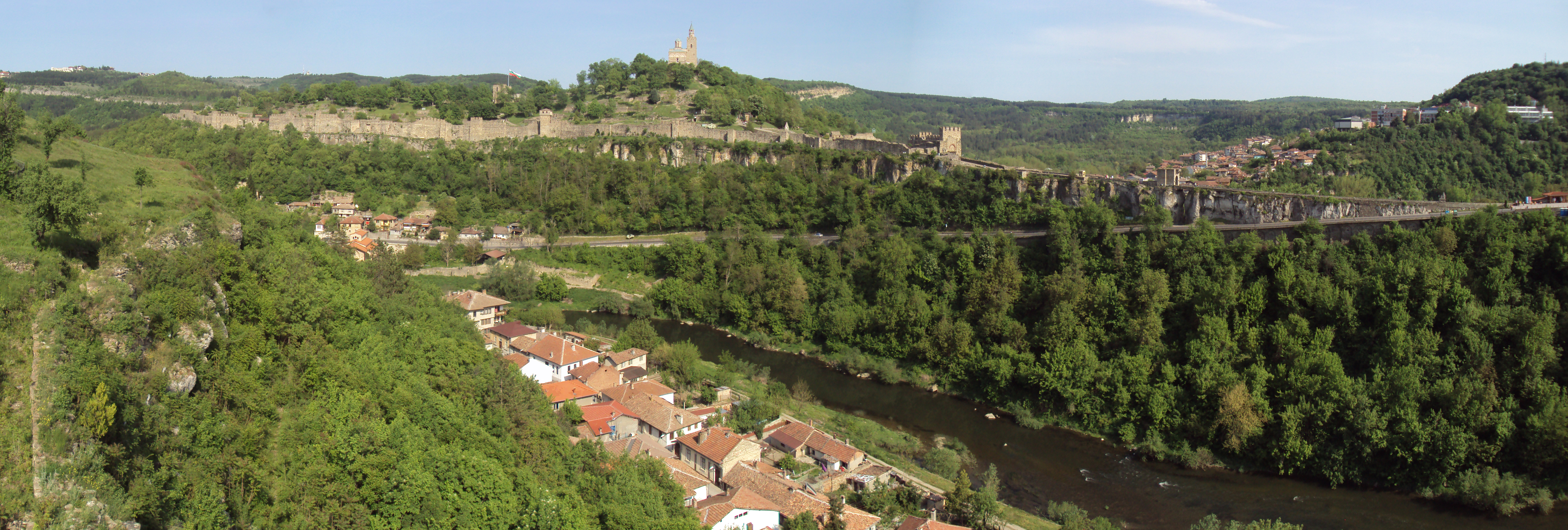
Panoramic view from Trapezitsa to Tsarevets with the Yantra, Veliko Tarnovo

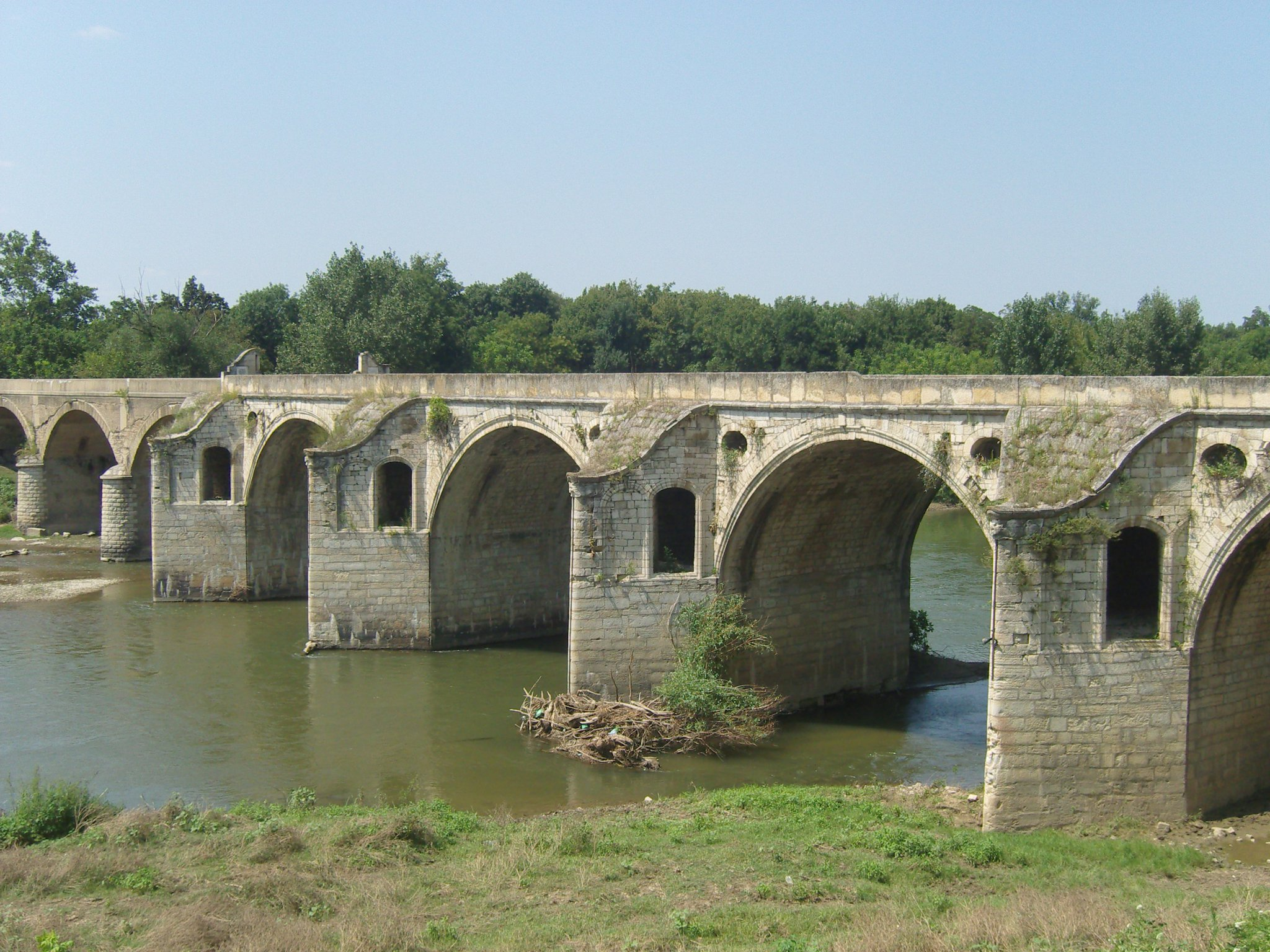
Byala Bridge over the Yantra

The Yantra basin encompasses six provinces but the river flows through three, Gabrovo, Veliko Tarnovo and Ruse. There are 22 settlements along its course, five towns and 17 villages. In Gabrovo Province are located the city of Gabrovo in Gabrovo Municipality and the village of Yantra in Dryanovo Municipality. In Veliko Tarnovo Province are situated Vetrintsi, Pushevo, Ledenik, Shemshevo, Veliko Tarnovo (city) and Samovodene in Veliko Tarnovo Municipality, Parvomaytsi, Gorna Oryahovitsa (town), Pravda, Dolna Oryahovitsa (town), Varbitsa and Draganovo in Gorna Oryahovitsa Municipality, and Petko Karavelovo, Radanovo and Karantsi in Polski Trambesh Municipality. In Ruse Province are Polsko Kosovo, Byala (town), Starmen and Botrov in Byala Municipality, and Dolna Studena, Beltsov, Dzhulyunitsa, Belyanovo, Novgrad and Krivina in Tsenovo Municipality. Its waters, especially in the lower course in the Danubian Plain, are utilized for irrigation. The upper sections of the Yantra and its tributaries are a source for potable water. There are several small hydro power plants, including Yantra HPP, Malusha HPP and Lyubovo HPP.

Almost the entire length of the river valley is traversed by roads of the national network, including a 43.6 km stretch of the first class I-5 road Ruse–Stara Zagora–Makaza, which follows the river intermittently in the sections Byala–Petko Karavelovo, Samovodene–Veliko Tarnovo, and around Gabrovo. Another important road is the second class II-54 road Vardim–Byala, which runs next to the river for 8.2 km.

Along the river valley between Byala and Veliko Tarnovo passes a section of major railway line Ruse–Stara Zagora–Podkova served by the Bulgarian State Railways.

== Landmarks ==
A few kilometers south the Yantra's source stands the Buzludzha monument, a memorial inaugurated in 1981 by the Bulgarian Communist Party, whose futurist architecture, impressive surrounding and melancholic atmosphere of decay has gained increased international popularity in recent years. The uppermost part of the river falls within the boundaries of the Bulgarka Nature Park. Along the river banks south of Gabrovo is located the Etar Architectural-Ethnographic Complex, an open-air museums featuring the architecture, way of life and economy of region during the Bulgarian National Revival. In Gabrovo, a city renown for the humour, the statue of its legendary founder Racho the Blacksmith was placed on a rock in the Yantra, so that the residents would not waste money on flowers on the monument.

Further upstream the river passes through the city of Veliko Tarnovo, the capital of the Second Bulgarian Empire, forming a meandering gorge. The Fortress of Tsarevets is almost completely surrounded by a meander of the Yantra and on the opposite bank raises the Fortress of Trapezitsa, surrounded by the river on three sides. Churches and houses overlook the river as its passes through the city. On a nearby hill is located the historic village of Arbanasi. In the Middle Ages those condemned to death were thrown from Tsarevets to the Yantra gorge below; a well known victim was the Bulgarian Patriarch Joachim III, who was thrown in the Yantra on orders of Emperor Theodore Svetoslav in 1300. The Transfiguration Monastery is situated over the left bank of the river in the Dervent Gorge some 7 km north of Veliko Tarnovo.

Close to the town of Byala along its lower course, the river is crossed by the 19th century arched Byala Bridge, an important landmark of the Bulgarian National Revival architecture, constructed by the architect Kolyu Ficheto.

== Gallery ==
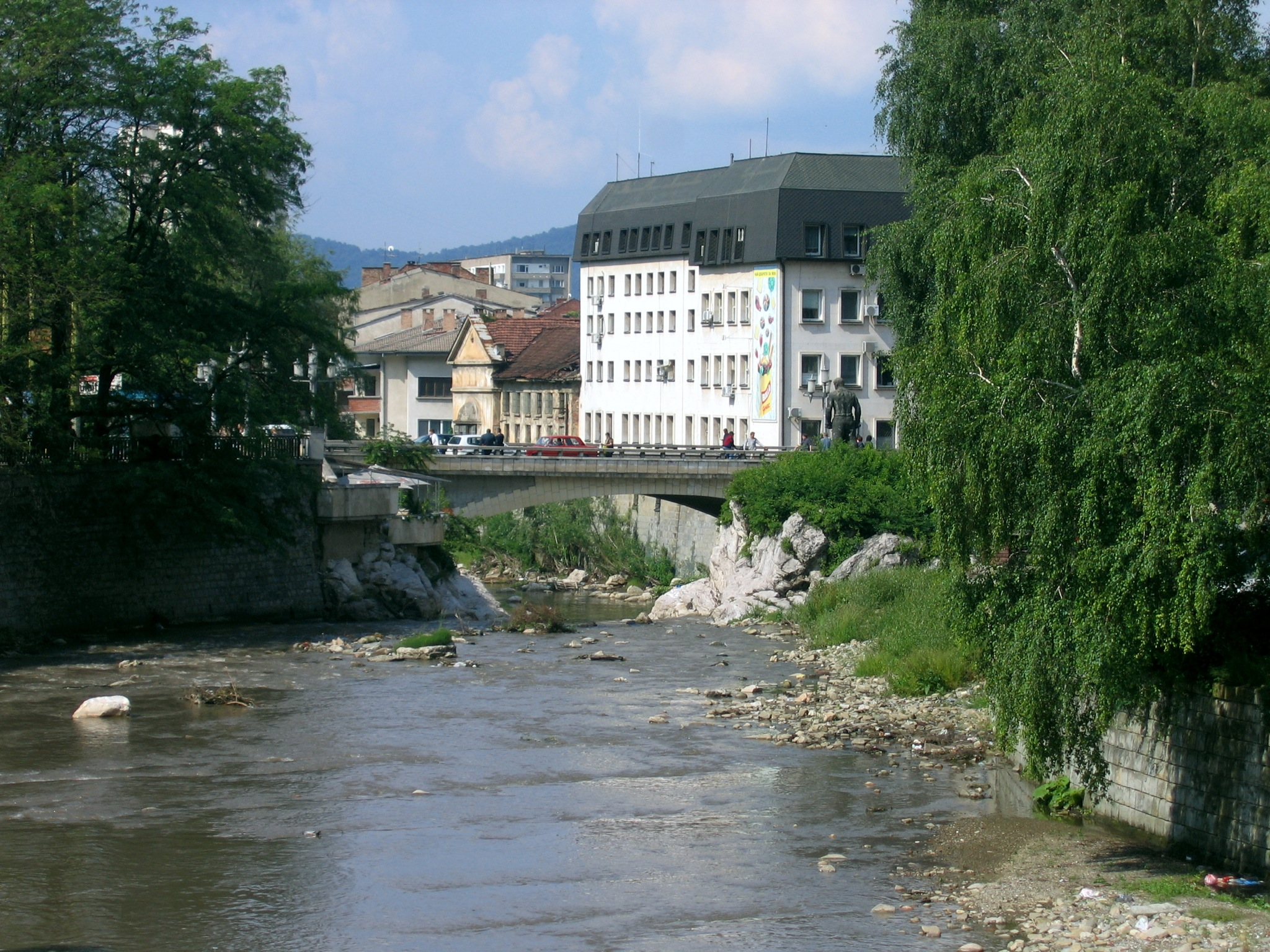
The Yantra at Gabrovo

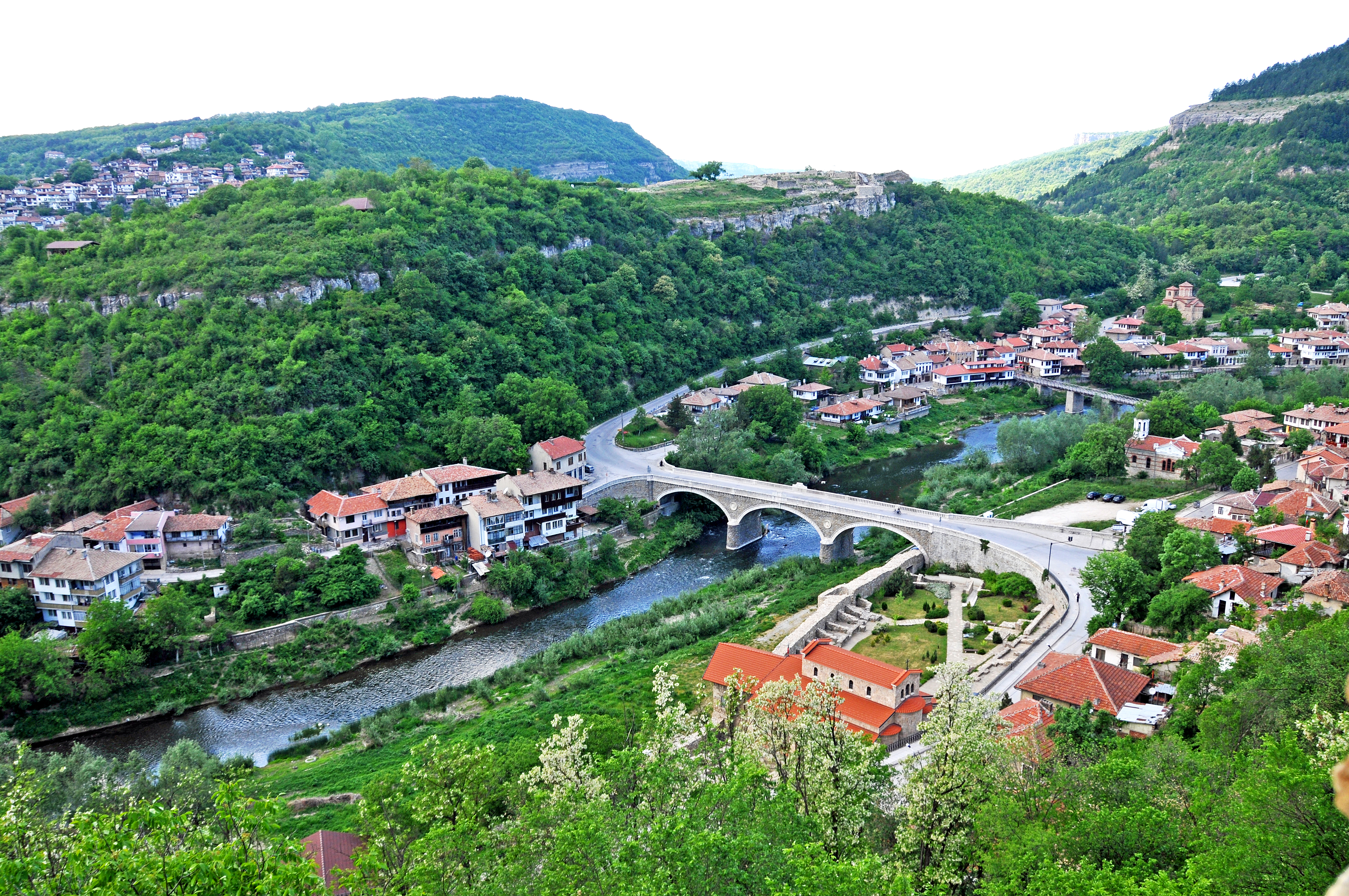
The Yantra at Veliko Tarnovo

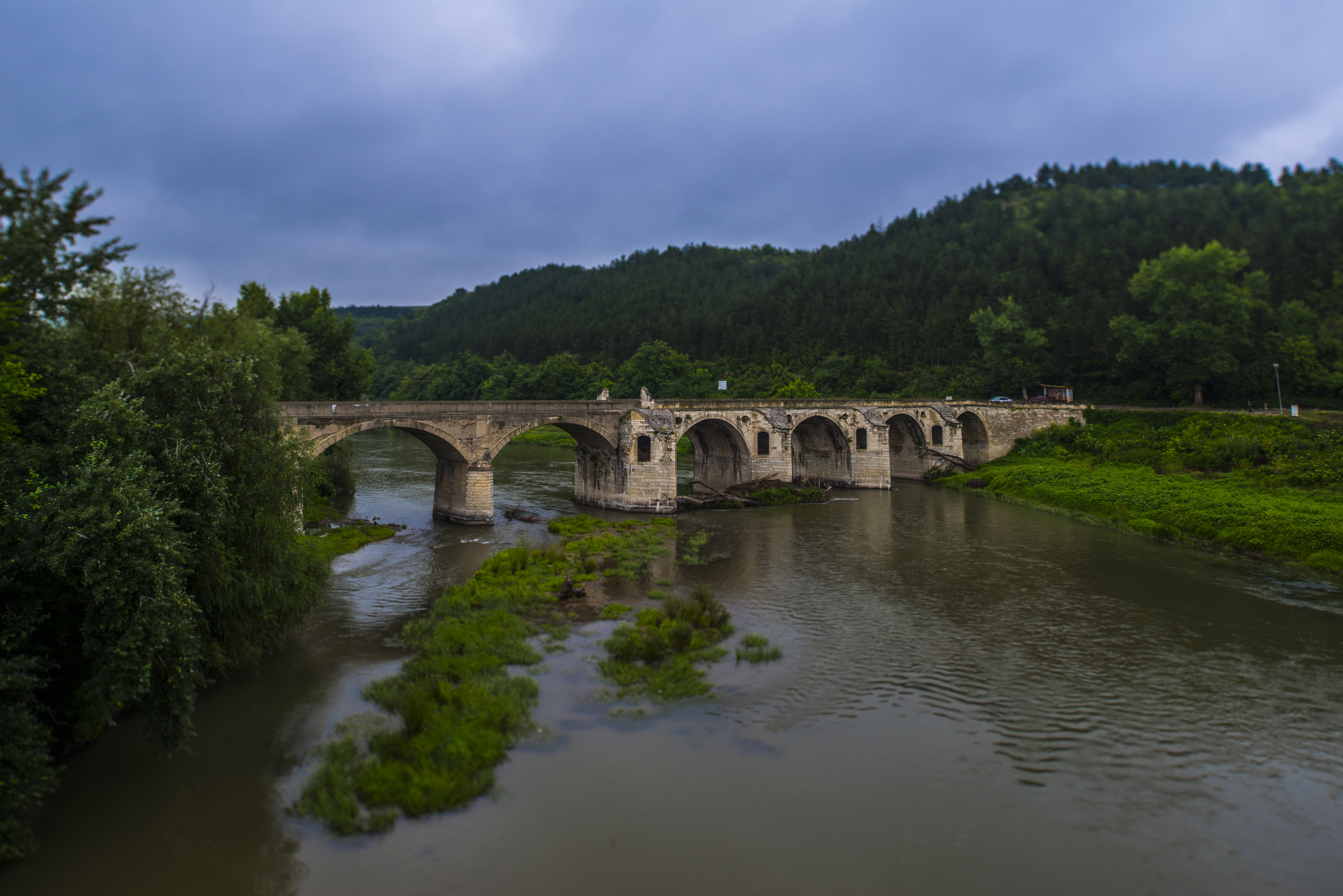
The Yantra at Byala

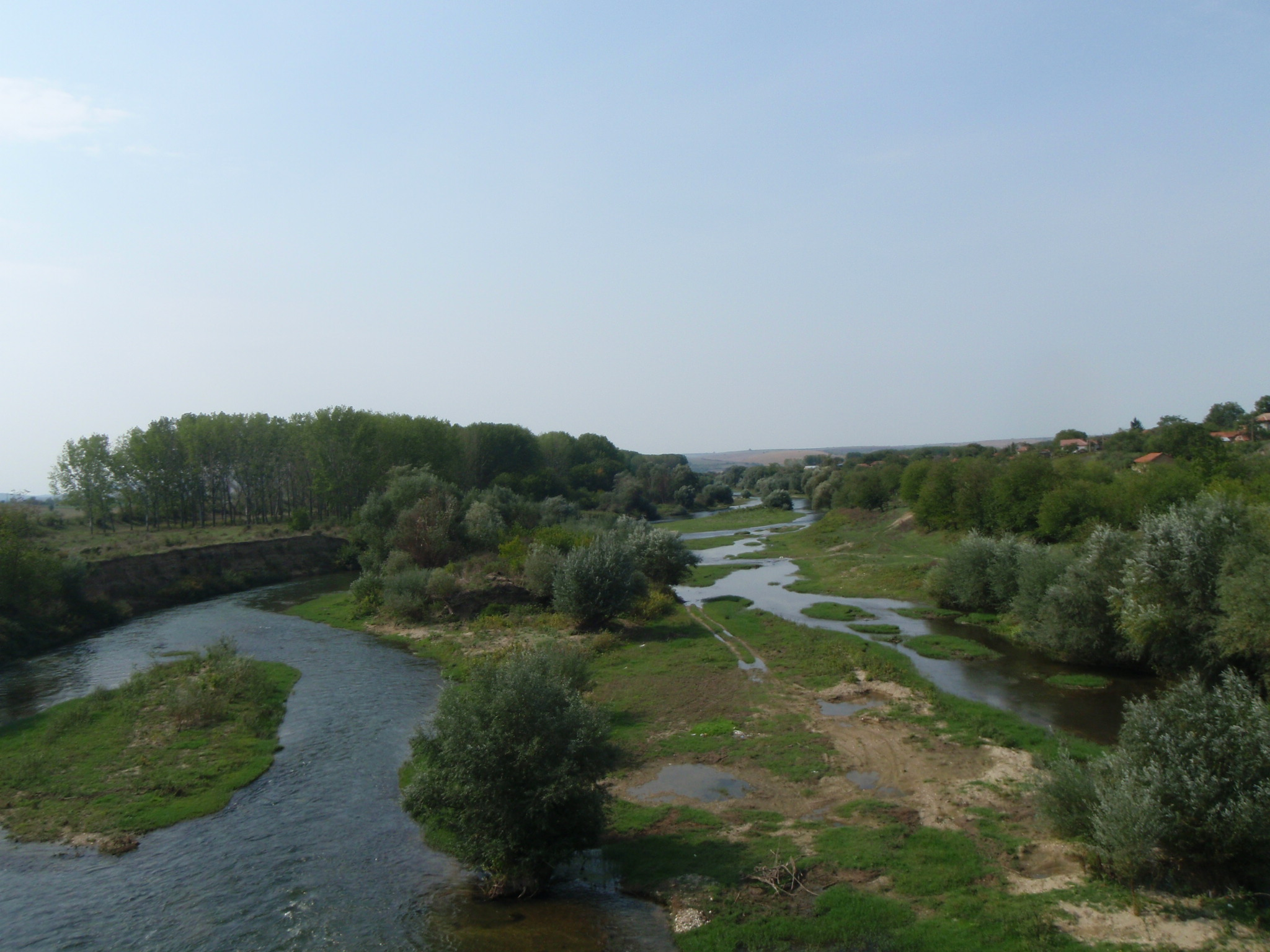
The Yantra at Beltsov
