= Marino pole, Veliko Tarnovo =

District and neighbourhood in Veliko Tarnovo, Bulgaria

Marino pole (Bulgarian: Марино поле) is a district and neighbourhood of Veliko Tarnovo, Bulgaria.

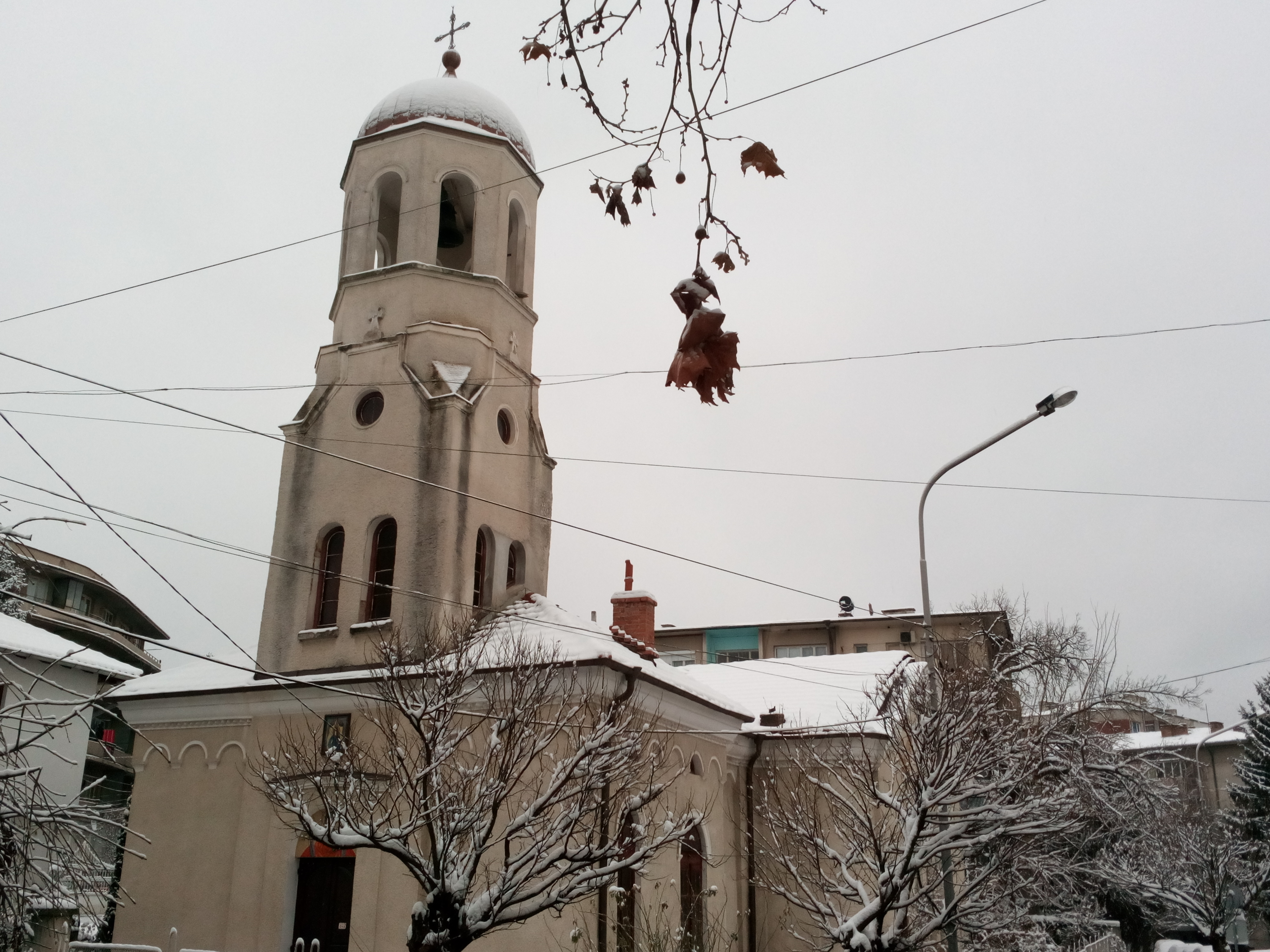
Orthodox Church Saint Marina

== History ==
According to legend, Tsar Ivan Shishman sister fled to the woods, where the present Marno Pole neighborhood is located, to escape from the Turkish troops and not become part of the Sultan's harem. During the National Revival in the area around this forest, the village of Marno Pole emerged. In 1850, the Church of St. Marina was built in the village by master architect Kolyu Ficheto. In 1896 the Culture center "Iskra" was established. In 1935 the village became a district of Veliko Tarnovo.
