= Belenski most =

Belenski most (Беленски мост)
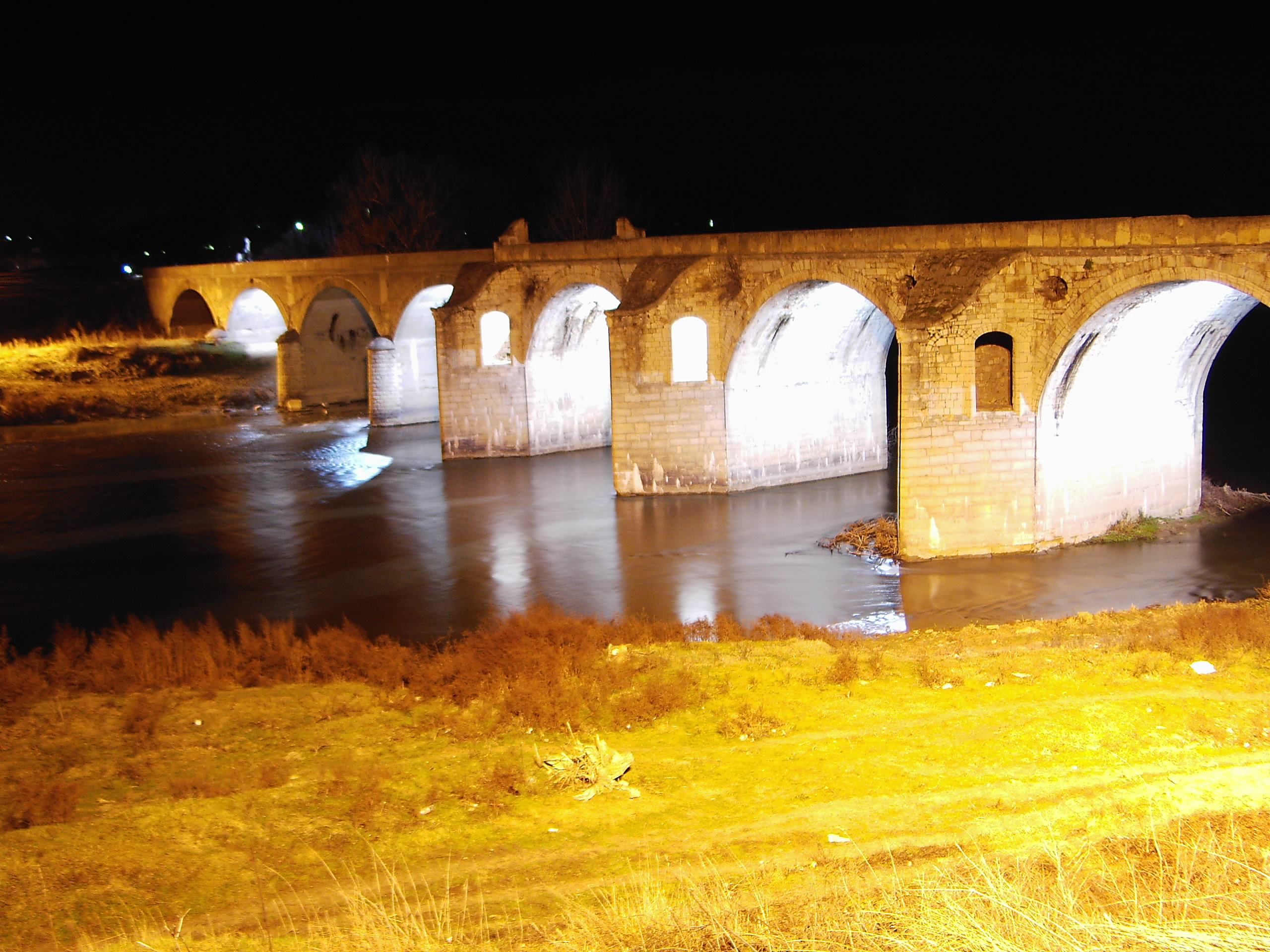
- Coordinates: 43°28′11″N 25°43′30″E
- Carries: cars, pedestrians
- Crosses: the Yantra River
- Locale: close to Byala, Ruse Province, Bulgaria

Characteristics
- Design: arch bridge
- Total length: 276 m
- Width: 6 m
- Longest span: 12 m
- Clearance below: 12 m

History
- Opened: 1867

The Belenski most (Беленски мост) or Byala Bridge is an arch bridge over the Yantra River in northern Bulgaria, 1 km from the town of Byala in Ruse Province, whose name it carries. It is regarded as one of the prominent achievements of Bulgarian National Revival engineering and architecture.

The bridge was constructed between 1865 and 1867 by Bulgarian architect and master builder Kolyu Ficheto on the order of Turkish statesman Midhat Pasha, when Bulgaria was part of the Ottoman Empire. While other architects were willing to build it for 2 to 3 million groschen, Kolyu Ficheto was willing to build it for 700 thousand. When asked to confirm this sum, he replied that Midhat Pasha could take his head if he didn't succeed doing it for this sum. It is 276 m long and 6 m wide, has 14 arches each with a clearance of 12 m and decorated with relief images of animals. Constructed from local limestone and limestone plaster, it is supported by 13 props with cutwaters.

The Belenski most suffered from a flood in 1897, as eight vaults of the central part (about 130 m) were destroyed. It was reconstructed between 1922 and 1923 with reinforced concrete props and arches, but its initial appearance was not altered.

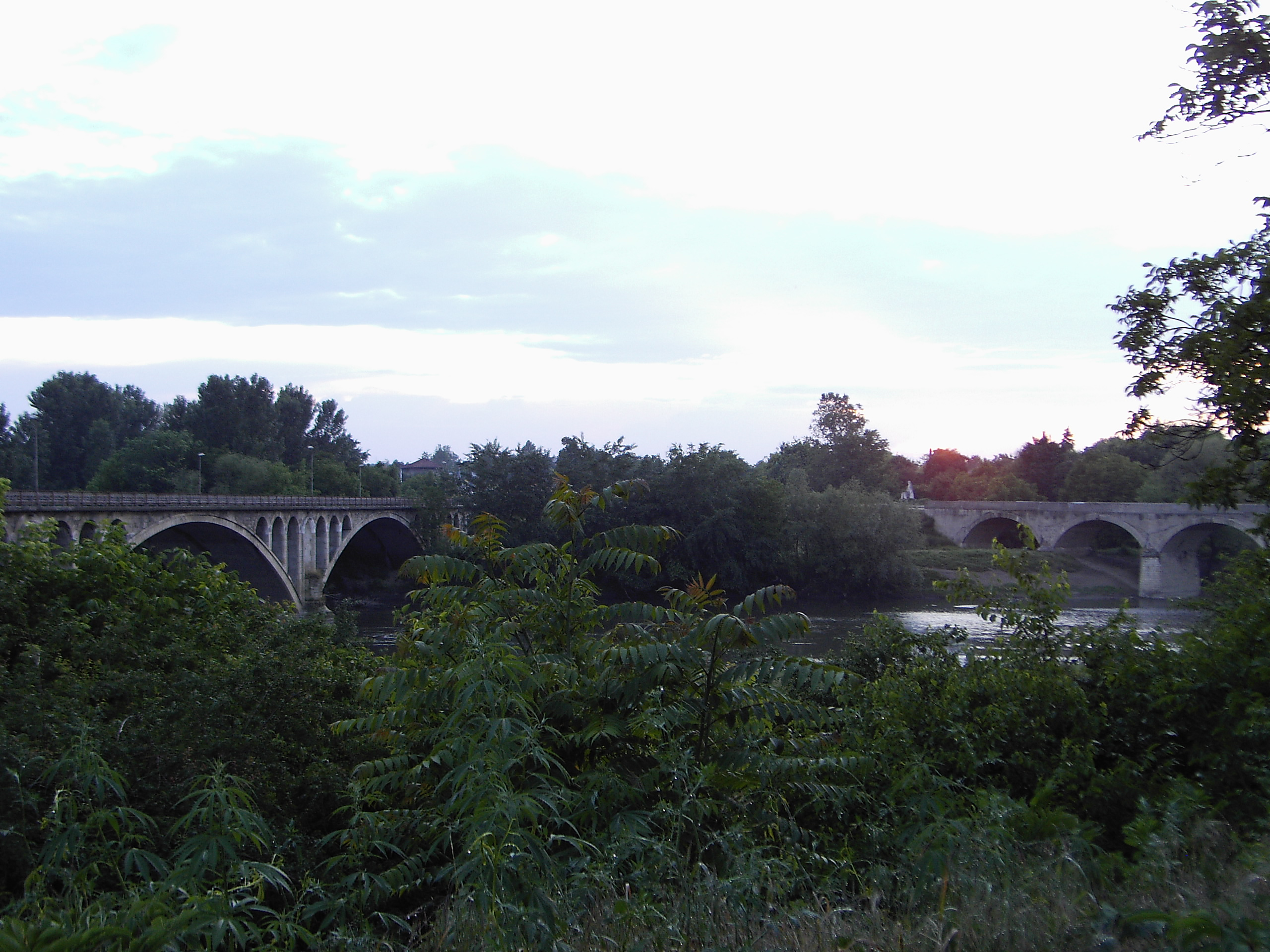
New bridge is built next to old one.

The bridge is not suitable for modern automobiles, and a new one is built next to the old (approx. 40 m away) to handle the traffic.
