= II-34 road (Bulgaria) =

Road in Bulgaria

Republic Road I-34
- Републикански път I-34

Route information
- Length: 44.5 km (27.7 mi)

Major junctions
- From: Km 80.1 of I-3, Vratsa
- To: Km 115.0 of II-52, Nikopol

Location
- Country: Bulgaria

Highway system
- Highways in Bulgaria

Republican Road II-34 (Bulgarian: Републикански път II-34) is a 2nd class road in northwestern Bulgaria, running in general direction southwest–northeast entirely through the territory of Pleven Province. Its length is 44.5 km.

The road starts at Km 80.1 of the first class I-3 road north of the village of Grivitsa, and heads northeast through the central Danubian Plain. It passes through the villages of Koilovtsi, Mechka, Asenovo and Debovo, where it turns northwest along the left bank of the river Osam. Before the village of Muselievo the road turns north, crosses the river and continues along its right bank until its confluence with the Danube, where it heads east until the town of Nikopol, where it reaches its terminus at Km 115 of the second class II-52 road.
