= Dolna Oryahovitsa =

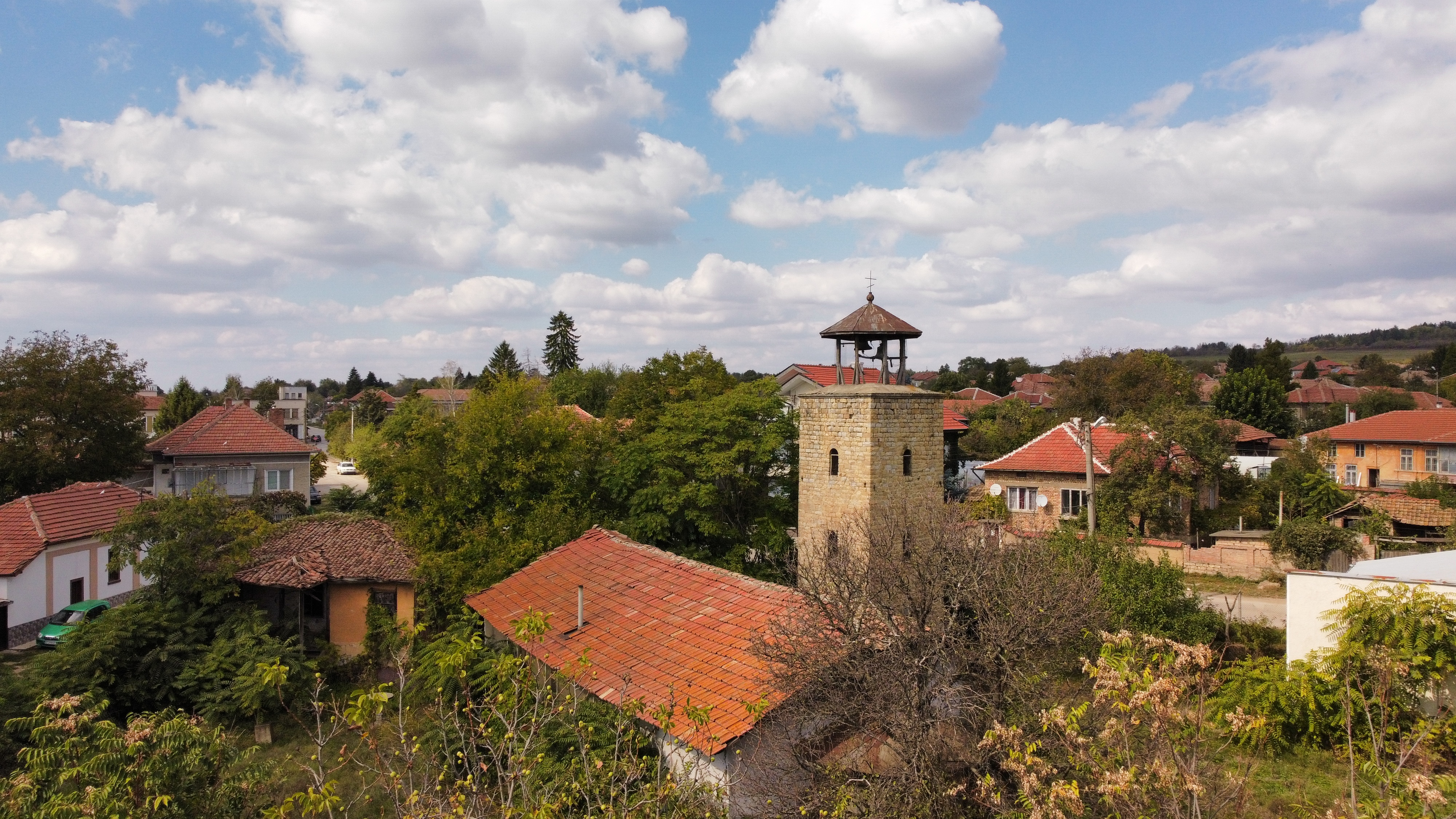

- Location of Dolna Oryahovitsa
- Coordinates: 43°09′23″N 25°44′21″E
- Country: Bulgaria
- Province (Oblast): Veliko Tarnovo

Government
  - Mayor: Grigor Minkov
- Elevation: 99 m (325 ft)

Population (2008)
  - Total: 3,227
- Time zone: UTC+2 (EET)
  - Summer (DST): UTC+3 (EEST)
- Postal Code: 5130
- Area code: 06173

Dolna Oryahovitsa (Bulgarian: Долна Оряховица [ˈdoɫnɐ oˈrʲaxovit͡sɐ]) is a town in northern Bulgaria, part of Gorna Oryahovitsa municipality, Veliko Tarnovo Province.

== Geography ==
Dolna Oryahovitsa is situated on the coast of Yantra River, 10 kilometers south from Veliko Tarnovo, 3 kilometers north from Gorna Oryahovitsa, and 250 kilometers east from Bulgaria's capital Sofia. The climate in the area is warm during the summer, whereas the winters are cold.

== History ==
The name of Dolna Oryahovitsa is mentioned in Turkish documents in the end of XVII and XVIII centuries. The town is located in an old Slavic settlement, which was famous for its fertile agricultural lands. Dolna Oryahovitsa becomes a town in 1985. During the Balkan wars, two men voluntarily participated in the Macedonian uprisings.

== Population ==
According to Bulgaria's Population Census in 2011.

Numbers and percentage of ethnic groups according to the National 2011 Census.

	Number	Percentage
Total	2971	100.00
Bulgarians	2624	88.32
Turkish	11	0.37
Romani	36	1.21
Others	14	0.47
Prefer not to answer	6	0.20
Unanswered	280	9.42
