= Varbitsa, Veliko Tarnovo Province =

Varbitsa
- Village
- Varbitsa
- Location within Bulgaria
- Coordinates: 43.306177°N 25.766614°E
- Country: Bulgaria
- Province: Veliko Tarnovo
- Municipality: Gorna Oryahovitsa

Area
  - Total: 55.93 km^{2} (21.595 sq mi)
- Elevation: 56 m (184 ft)

Population
  - Total: 1,089
- Postal code: 5128
- Area code: 061703

Varbitsa is a village in Northern Bulgaria, in Gorna Oryahovitsa Municipality, Veliko Tarnovo Province. According to the 2020 Bulgarian

census, Varbitsa has a population of 1,089 people with a permanent address registration in the settlement.

== Geography ==
The village is 25 kilometers from Veliko Tarnovo and 15 km from Gorna Oryahovitsa. It lies on the shore of the Yantra River. The climate's characteristic traits are a hot summer and a cold winter.

The elevation of the village ranges between 50 and 99 meters, with an average elevation of 56 meters.

Most of the land area of the village (89%) is covered by agricultural territories, followed by 8% of urbanized areas and 3% of dams and rivers. The village has no forests within its area.

== Culture ==
The old name of the village was Vleshitsa. In 1936, it received the name Varbitsa. In the nearby area Mustadzha there are traces of Roman and Thracian civilizations.

=== Buildings ===
During the period after the merger of the two villages Sergyuvets and Teminsko, Parvomaytsi flourishes as a settlement. Most buildings were built during that time.

- In 1863, the village's first school was established and built.
- In 1937, the municipality raised funds to build the church "Sv Georgi Pobedonosets”
- In 1894, the library and community hall "Gradina – Varbitsa 1894" was built.

== Ethnicity ==
According to the Bulgarian population census in 2011.

	Number	Percentage(in %)
Total	1070	100.00
Bulgarians	390	36.44
Turks	181	16.91
Romani	13	1.21
Others	0	0
Do not define themselves	0	0
Unanswered	475	44.39
