= Church of the Holy Trinity, Svishtov =

Church in Veliko Tarnovo, Bulgaria

Coordinates: 43°36′59″N 25°21′4″E

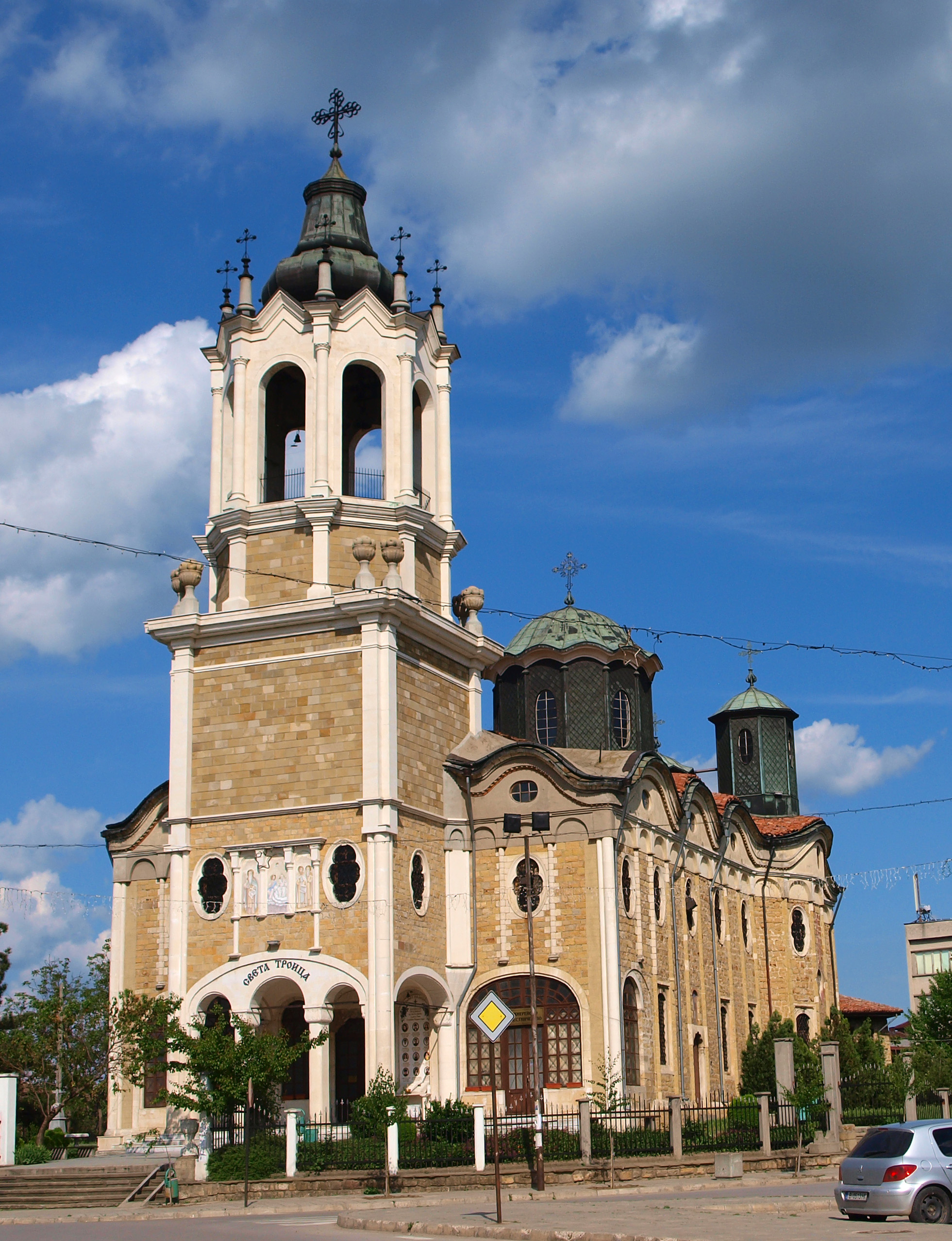
The Church of the Holy Trinity

The Church of the Holy Trinity (Bulgarian: Църква „Света Троица", Tsarkva „Sveta Troitsa") is a 19th-century Bulgarian Orthodox church in the northern Bulgarian town of Svishtov and one of the finest examples of late Bulgarian National Revival church architecture.

A work of the best-known Bulgarian architect of the period, Nikola Fichev, the church was inaugurated on 19 September 1867 and constructed on the highest spot in the town. The three-naved church features a central dome and an elongated 30 m-long body with thin and high columns supporting the naves, as well as three smaller domes. The design of the façades is particularly remarkable. Fichev notably broke the Orthodox architectural canon by making the whole east façade a giant undulating apse.

The iconostasis, 16 m long and an average 10 m high, was created by Anton Peshev from Debar in 1870–1872 and the 73 icons were painted by Nikolai Pavlovich, a master from Svishtov. The bell tower, stylistically a reference to Baroque architecture, was added in 1883–1886 and designed by Gencho Novakov.

Several important figures, including the first Bulgarian Exarch Antim I (1872), the Metropolitan of Tarnovo Ilarion Makariopolski (1872) and the eparchial metropolitan bishop Clement of Tarnovo (1889) have held services in the church. It was also visited by Russian Emperor Alexander II, who attended the service on 28 June 1877. Alexander II also donated six bells for the bell tower.

The Church of the Holy Trinity suffered damage from an earthquake on 4 March 1977, but was subsequently restored. Today, the church with its iconostasis is a cultural monument of national importance.
