= Parvomaytsi =

- Village
- Parvomaytsi
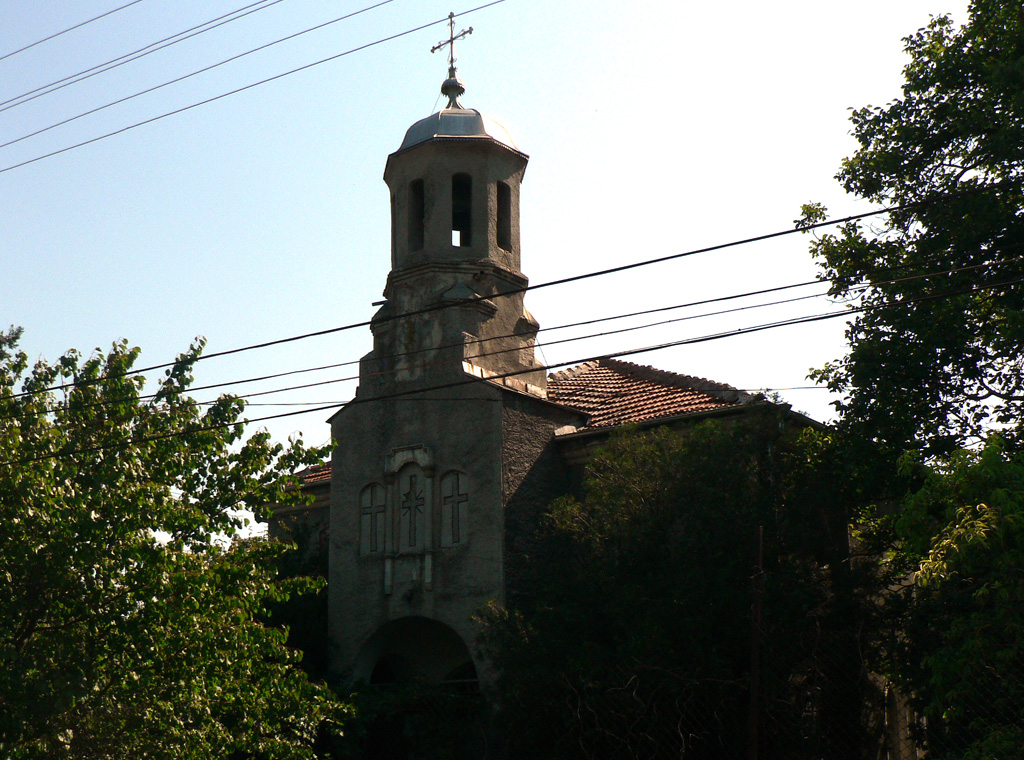
- The church Voznesenie Gospodne in Parvomaytsi

- Location within Bulgaria
- Coordinates: 43.153013°N 25.652072°E
- Country: Bulgaria
- Province: Veliko Tarnovo
- Municipality: Gorna Oryahovitsa

Area
  - Total: 31.721 km^{2} (12.248 sq mi)
- Elevation: 91 m (299 ft)

Population
  - Total: 2,565
- Postal code: 5139
- Area code: 06175

Parvomaytsi is a village in Northern Bulgaria, in Gorna Oryahovitsa Municipality, Veliko Tarnovo Province, and is also the largest village in the province. According to the 2020 Bulgarian census, the village has a population of 2565 people.

== Geography ==
Parvomaytsi village is at an elevation of 104 meters. The village is 5 kilometers from the railway station of Gorna Oryahovitsa and 12 kilometers north from Veliko Tarnovo. The river Yantra crosses near the village.

It borders the nearby villages Pravda, Samovodene, and Polikraishte. Agricultural lands of the village are 74%, while forests are 9%, and settlements 10%.

== Culture ==
The first written text found in Bulgarian history which mentions the village dates back to the XII century.

The settlement used to include two villages Teminsko and Sergyuvets, later with an order from the Municipality both are combined to form one village – Parvomytsi with a total population of 3138 people, making it the largest in the province.

=== Buildings ===
During the period after the merger of the two villages Sergyuvets and Teminsko, Parvomaytsi flourishes as a settlement. Most buildings were built during that time.

- Monument – In 1919 villagers gather funds together and build a monument in honor of fallen Bulgarian warriors.
- The church was built in 1885. The second temple in the village was built in 1892. Both temples carry the same name – “Voznesenie Gospodne”
- The community hall and library were built in 1893 and contain over 16,500 books.
- The first school at Parvomaytsi was built in 1843, later in 1846, the second one started functioning.

== Ethnicity ==
According to the Bulgarian population census in 2011.

	Number	Percentage(в %)
Total	2784	100.00
Bulgarians	2612	93.82
Turks	5	0.17
Romani	3	0.10
Others	8	0.28
Do not define themselves	7	0.25
Unanswered	149	5.35
