= Kolyu Ficheto =

Bulgarian architect

Kolyo Ficheto monument in Dryanovo (Bulgaria)

Nikola Fichev (Bulgarian: Никола Фичев; 1800 in Direnova, Ottoman Empire – 1881 in Veliko Tarnovo, Principality of Bulgaria), commonly known as Kolyo Ficheto (Bulgarian: Колю Фичето) or with his Turkish honorific Usta (Master) Kolyo Ficheto, was a Bulgarian National Revival architect, builder and sculptor born in Dryanovo (then called Direnova) in 1800.

Left an orphan without a father at the age of three, Kolyu Ficheto was taught craftsmanship by the masterhands in the Trevne town (today Tryavna) since he was ten. He learned stonecutting in the town of Görice (today Korçë in Albania) when he was 17, and then mastered the construction of churches, bell towers and bridges from the craftsmen in Bratsigovo.

Kolyu Ficheto became a journeyman at the age of 23 and was fully recognized as a master craftsman by the whole builders' guild at 36. Aside from his native language Bulgarian, he spoke fluent Turkish and good Greek and Romanian, but was illiterate, unable to read and write. Kolyu Ficheto is known for having lain under one of his own bridges to guarantee its safety with his life.

Fichev died in Veliko Tarnovo, where he was buried, in 1881.

Some of his notable works include the Byala Bridge (Беленски мост, Belenski most) over the Yantra River close to Byala (1865–1867), the Covered Bridge in Lovech over the Osam (1872-1874), churches in his native town, as well as in Svishtov (Church of the Holy Trinity, 1867) and Veliko Tarnovo (1844), where he also designed a number of houses and public buildings.

== Architecture ==
The House with the Monkey - Veliko Tarnovo built in 1849 by Kolyo Ficheto

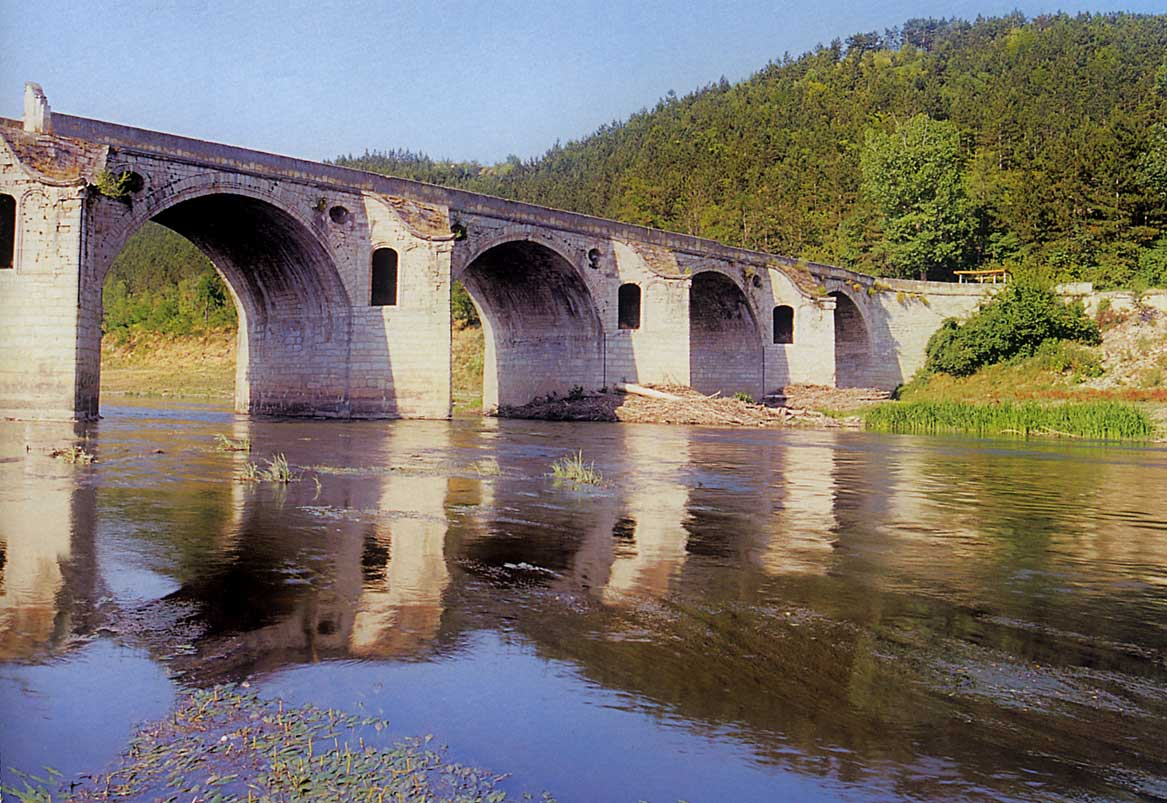
The bridge over Yantra River in Byala, Ruse Province, built in 1867 by Kolyo Ficheto

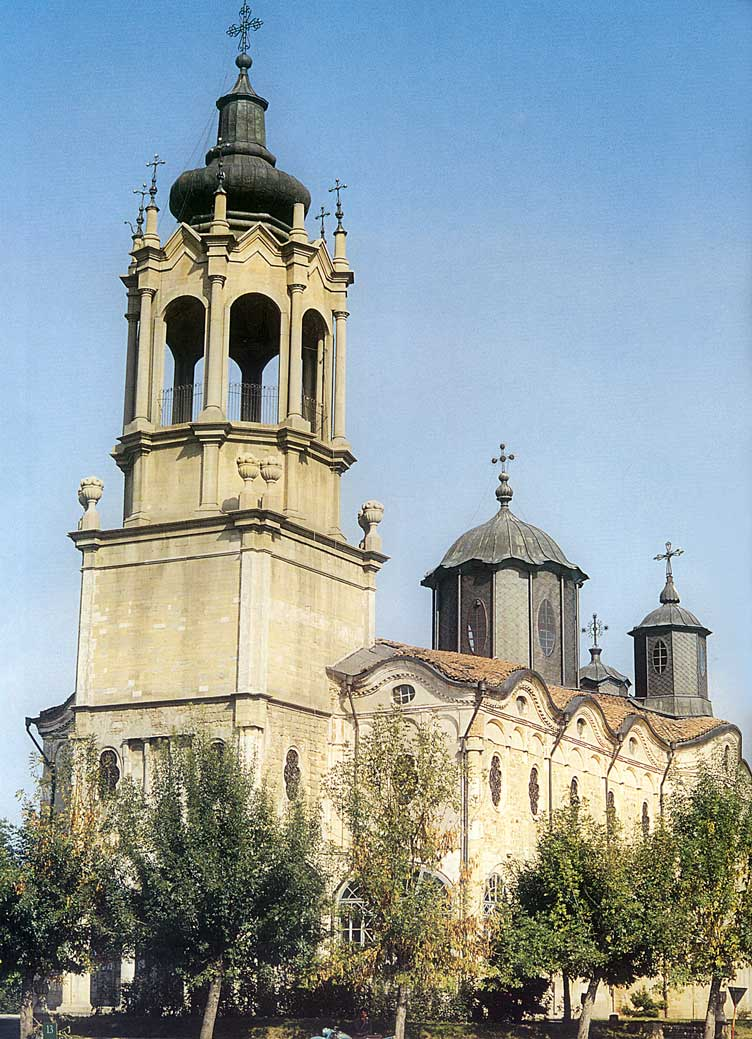
Church of the Holy Trinity, Svishtov, built in 1867 by Kolyo Ficheto

The Town-Hall in Veliko Turnovo, built in 1876 by Kolyo Ficheto

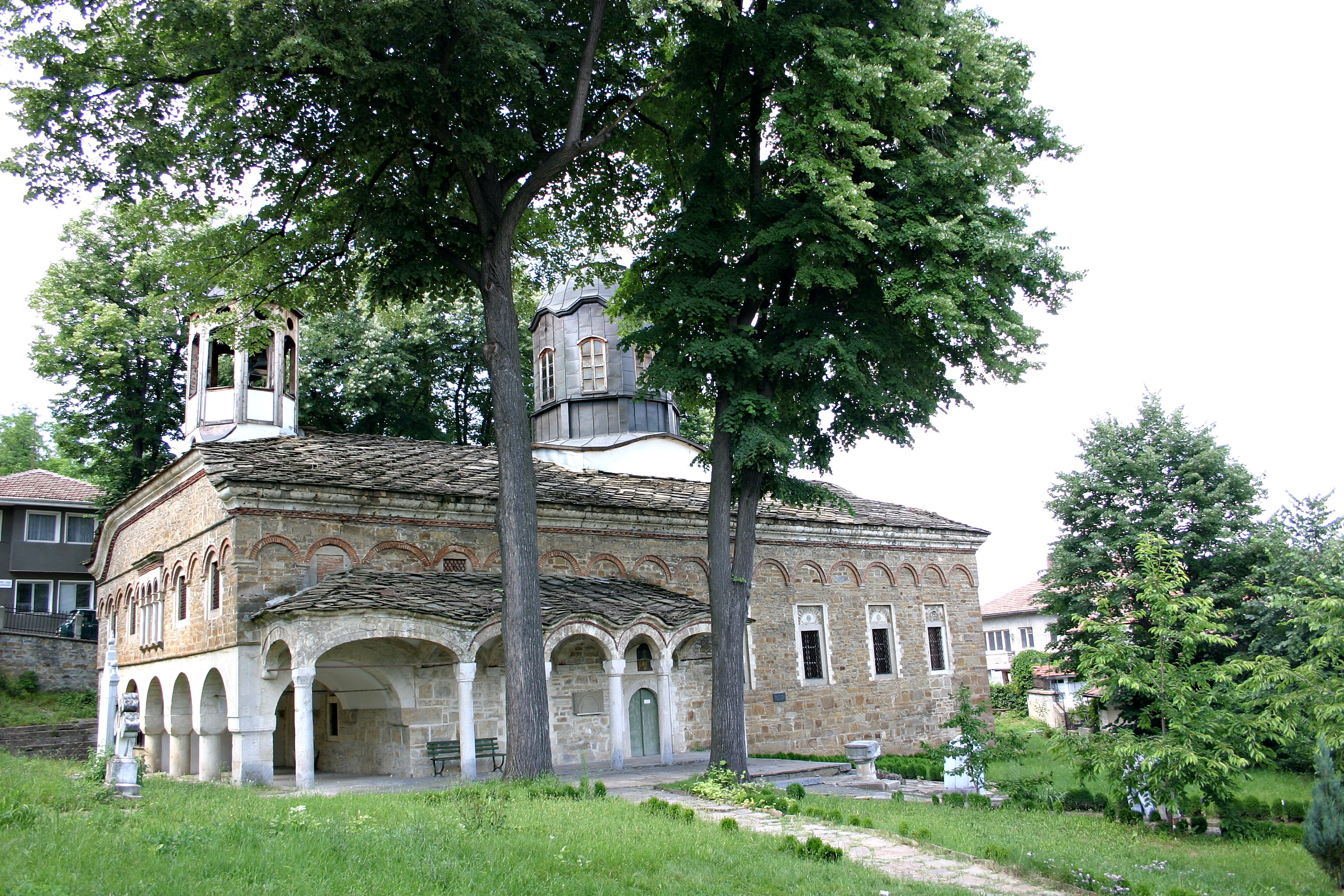
The 19th century church in Dryanovo, designed by Kolyo Ficheto

== Honour ==
Ficheto Point on Livingston Island in the South Shetland Islands, Antarctica is named after Kolyo Ficheto.
