= Trapezitsa (fortress) =

Coordinates: 43.0847°N 25.6460°E

Trapezitsa (Bulgarian: Трапезица) is a medieval stronghold located on a hill with the same name in Veliko Tarnovo in northern Bulgaria.

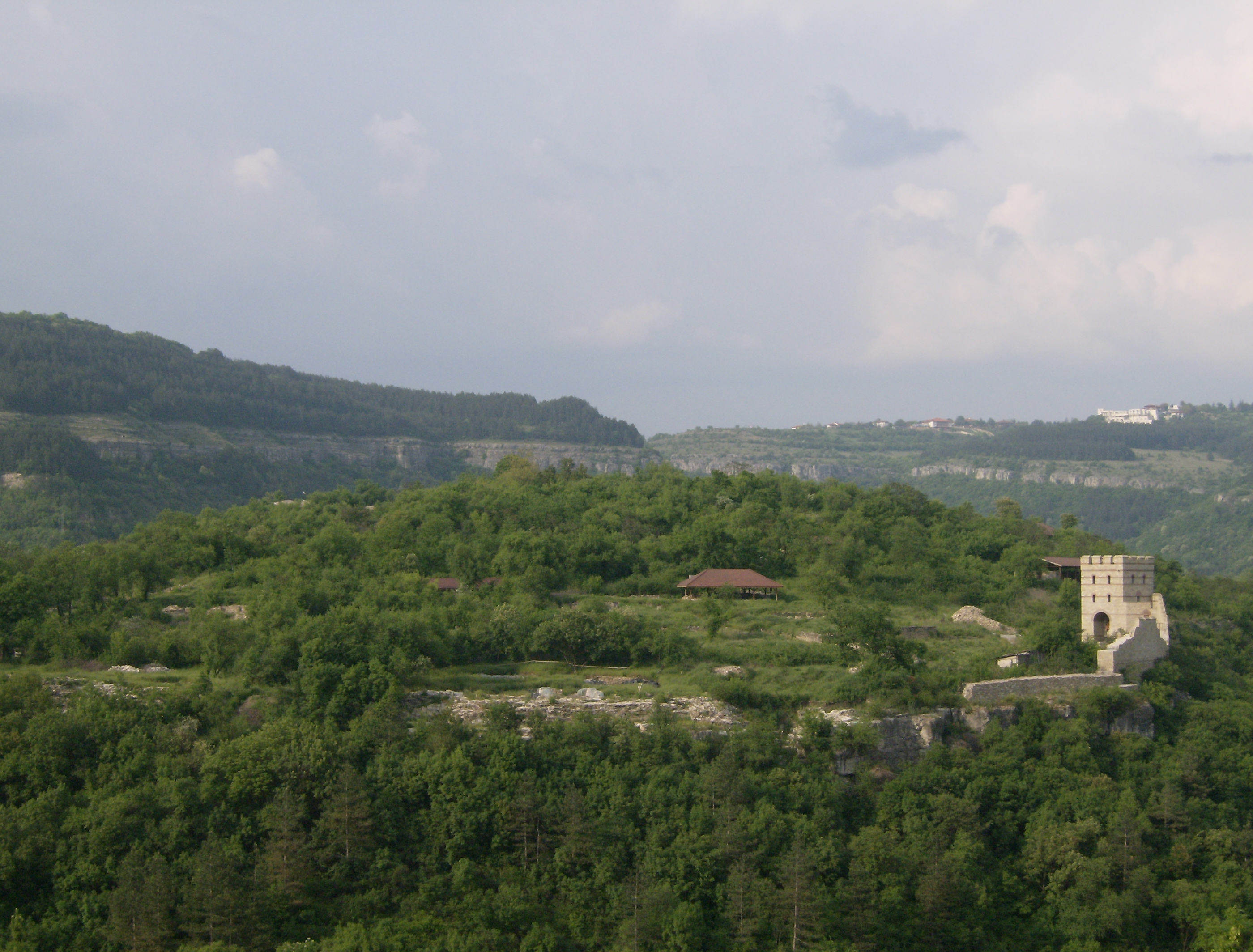

== Geographical location ==
Trapezitsa is located on a hill around which the Yantra River winds. It rises about 81 meters above the river level. Steep cliffs make the place difficult to access. The protected area is approximately 470x300 meters, with the elongated part facing north-south. The maximum area of the fortification is approximately 66.2 decares.

== Name ==
The name of Trapezitza is believed to derive from the word “трапеза” (table) or from “trapezium” as is the shape of the plateau. The most likely origin is the word “trapezits” – soldiers guarding the passes who were the first settlers on the hill in the Middle Ages.

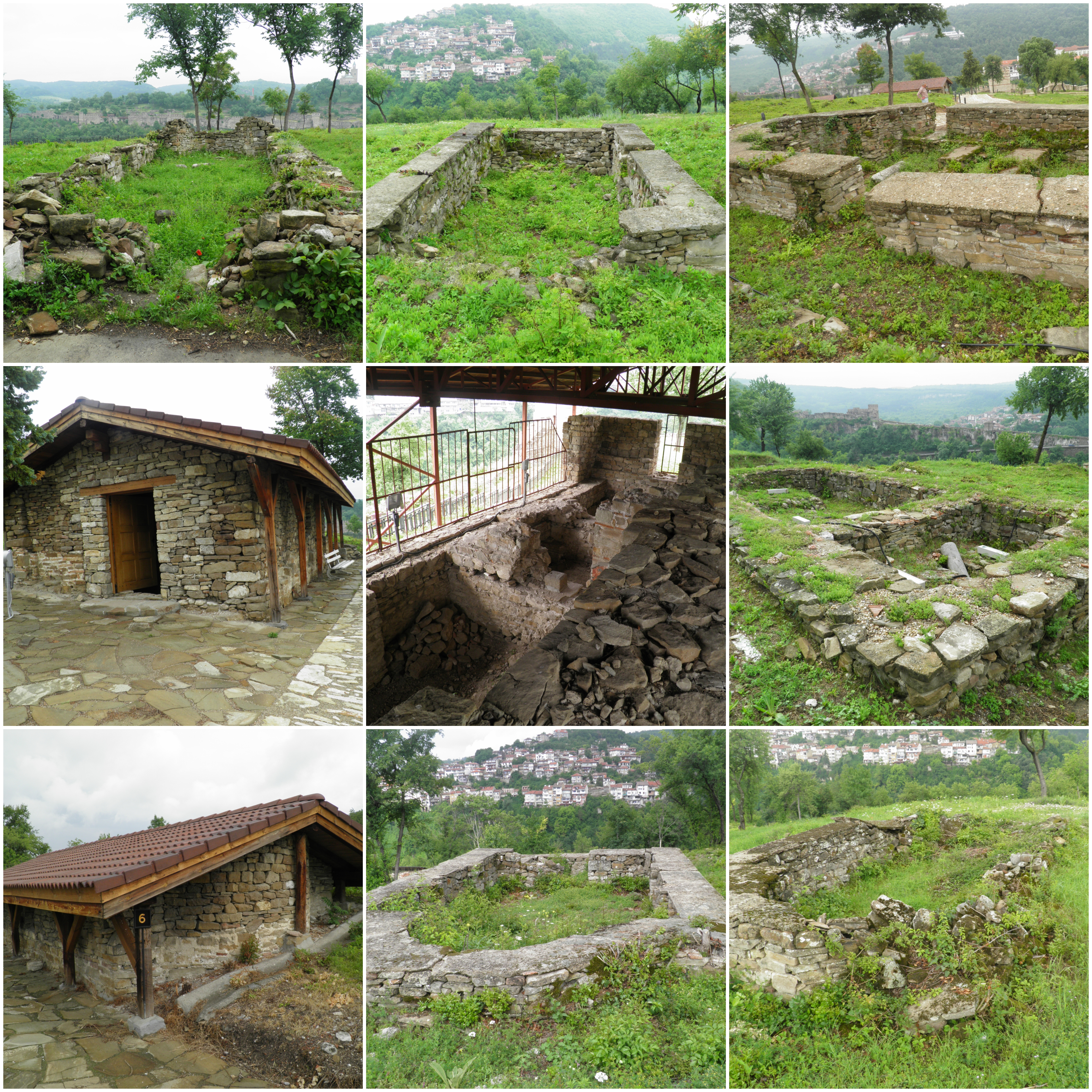

== History ==
The first fortified settlement, built on the hill, dates from the late Chalcolithic (4200-4000 BC).

During the Bronze Age (XIII-XII centuries BC) and the Early Iron Age (IX-VII centuries BC) there was a Thracian settlement on the hill.

The first traces of the medieval defense system on Trapezitsa date back to the 60-80s of the XII century. Main fortifications were built in the XIII and XIV centuries, during the Second Bulgarian Empire. Then Tarnovo became the capital of Bulgaria, and Trapezitsa was the second most important citadel of the city, after Tsarevets.

In 1195 Tsar Ivan Asen I transferred the relics of St. Ivan Rilski to a church built on Trapezitsa Hill. A monastery was built around it, bearing the name of the saint. Tsar Kaloyan transferred the relics of St. Gabriel of Lesnovo to the church “St. Apostles ”on Trapezitsa.

The fortress is called "The Glorious City of Trapezitsa" in medieval Bulgarian and Byzantine biographies of St. John of Rila, including those written by St. Patriarch Euthymius, in "Applied Biography of Gabriel Lesnowski" and a number of postscripts on Revival books.

On the hill of Trapezitsa were located the homes of noble Bulgarians - boyars, and numerous churches.

== Architecture ==
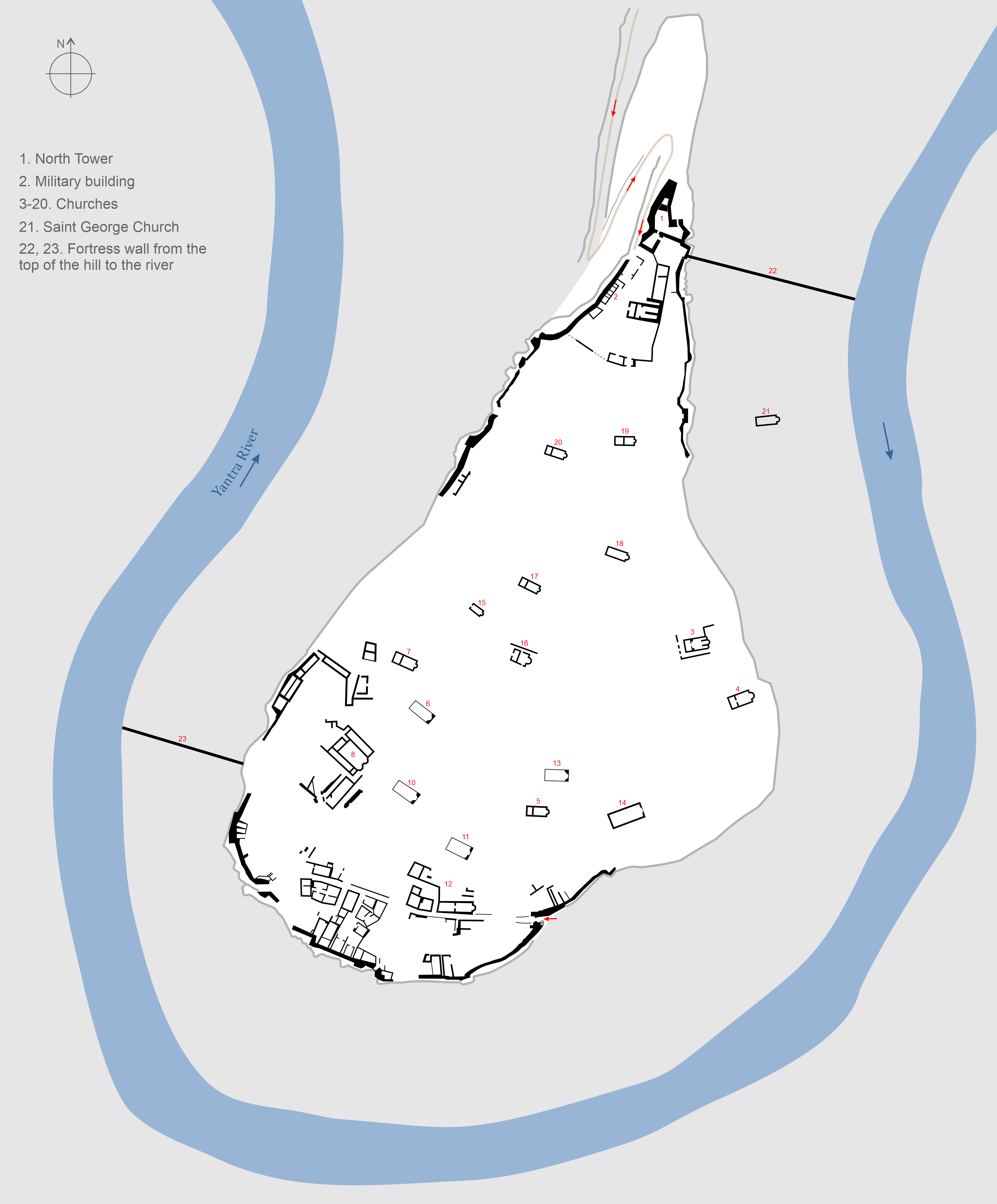

The hill is surrounded by a thick fortress wall made of crushed stone. Its height reached 6 meters. The fortress was entered through four entrances. The main entrance to Trapezitsa was located on the southeast side and was connected to Tsarevets by a bridge over the Yantra River opposite the Holy Forty Martyrs Church.

The churches of Trapezitsa were richly decorated with various architectural forms: pilasters, niches, blind arches, colored slabs and multicolored clay round or four-leafed plates, glazed green or yellow, arranged in one or more arcuate rows. Its interior decoration was made of mosaics and murals. The earliest church in Trapezitsa is the church № 16, which dates from the end of the X-beginning of the XI century. From the time of Assenevtsi there is a church № 5, which is the only one with mosaic decoration. The churches with numbers 2, 7 and 14 are known as “tomb churches” because of the burial facilities discovered in them. A stone plaque depicting the Archangel Michael was found in Church 2 and is believed to be the Church of the Holy Apostles. The churches with numbers 6, 11, 13, 14 are called "royal churches" because of the royal characters found in them in the frescoes. Seats and sinks have been found along the walls of the church №18.

== Recovery ==
Immediately after the Liberation of Bulgaria during the interim Russian rule, Marin Drinov, a professor at Kharkiv University and commissioner for education in free Bulgaria, together with Dr. Vasil Beron, chairman of the Tarnovo Archaeological Society, made the first excavations at Trapezitsa. The foundations of 17 churches and other buildings were discovered during excavations (1879-1884) carried out by the Archaeological Society in Tarnovo, as well as during the 1900 excavations carried out by the French archaeologist Georges Sor. Comprehensive systematic archeological excavations of Trapezitsa are carried out only today.

Between 2008 and 2015 new excavations were carried out on Trapezitsa. In the same period, the south tower was restored and some of the churches were reconstructed.

== Sources ==
- Dochev, K. Trapezitsa, southwestern sector. - In: Archaeological discoveries and excavations in 2009. Sofia, 2010.
- Dochev, K. Medieval town of Trapezitsa ”sector southwest, Veliko Tarnovo. - In: Archaeological discoveries and excavations in 2010. Sofia, 2011.
- Ovcharov, T. Medieval sites in the Veliko Tarnovo region. Veliko Tarnovo, 2001
- Ovcharov, T. The Antiquities in the Municipality of Veliko Tarnovo. Veliko Tarnovo, 2006
- Totev, K., E. Dermendzhiev, P. Karailiev and others. Archaeological excavations of the medieval town of Trapezitsa. Sector North, volume 1. Veliko Tarnovo, 2011.
- Shkorpil, K. Plan of the old Bulgarian capital Veliko Tarnovo. - In: Bulletin of the Bulgarian Archaeological Society, Volume 1. Sofia, 1910.
