= Samovodene =

Samovodene Самоводене
- Village
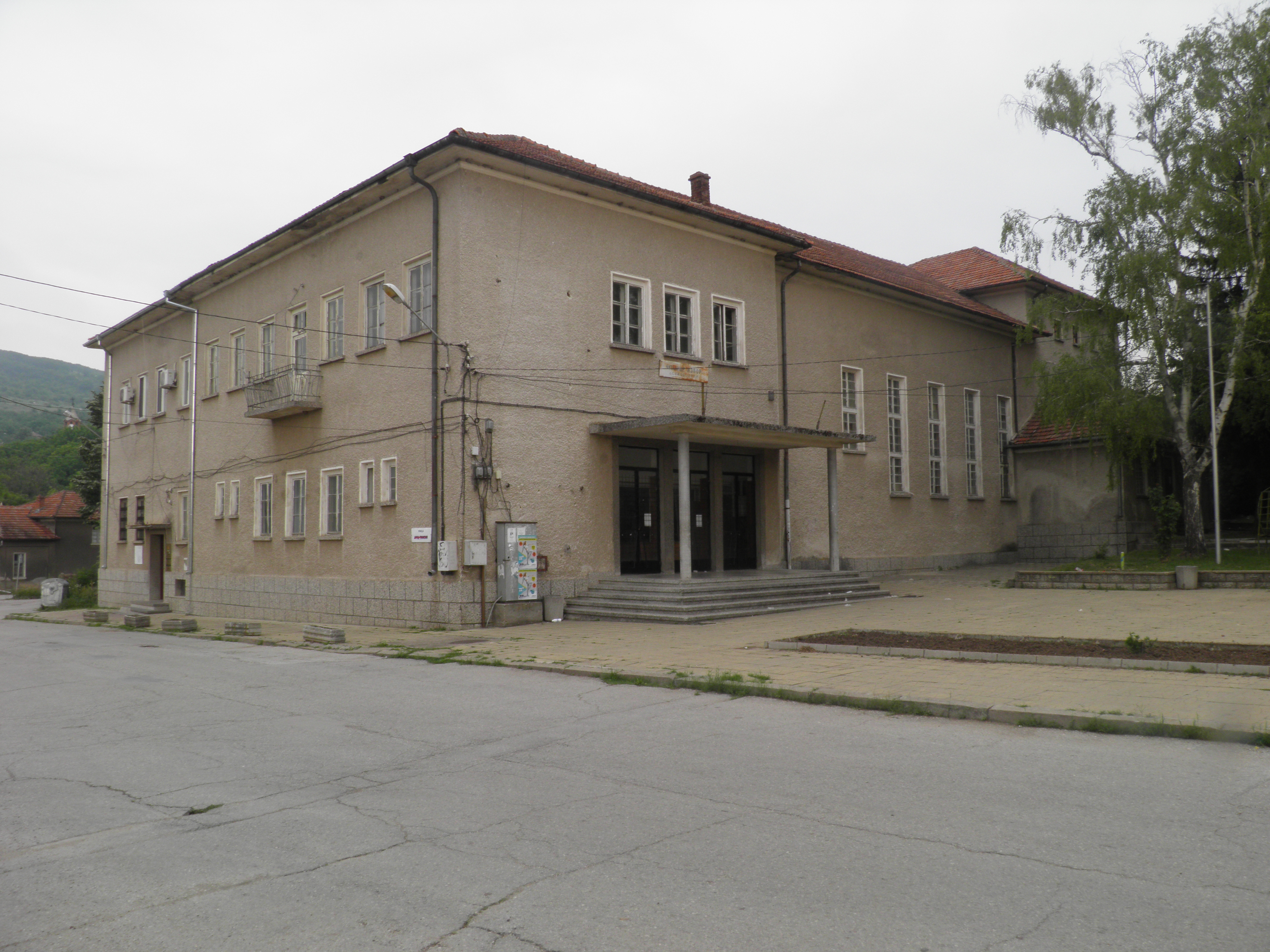
- Village hall

- Location within Bulgaria
- Coordinates: 43°09′25″N 25°18′00″E
- Country: Bulgaria
- Province: Veliko Tarnovo
- Community: Veliko Tarnovo

Government
  - Mayor: Valentin Kandev

Area
  - Total: 42,107 km^{2} (16,258 sq mi)
- Elevation: 181 m (594 ft)

Population
  - Total: 1 400
- Time zone: UTC+2 (EET)
  - Summer (DST): UTC+3 (EEST)
- Post code: 5040
- Area code: 06112

Samovodene (Bulgarian: Самоводене [samoˈvɔdɛnɛ]) is a village in Veliko Tarnovo Municipality, north-central Bulgaria.

== Geography ==
The village is located about 10 km north of Veliko Tarnovo. Near the village is the source of the river Rakovets.

=== Neighborhoods ===
The village is divided into three neighborhoods

- Inns (Bulgarian: Ханища)
- White Soil (Bulgarian: Бяла Пръст)
- Yoke (Bulgarian: Кобилица)

== Population ==
=== Religion ===
The Orthodox church "Saint Irina" was built in the 1840s. Christians.

=== Families from the village Samovodene ===
  - Alakov (Алъкови)
  - Baychev (Байчеви)
  - Vachev (Вачеви)
  - Gantsarov (Ганцарови)
  - Glushkov (Глушкови)
  - Dankov (Данкови)
  - Evtimov (Евтимови)
  - Karadachev (Карадачеви)
  - Kovachev (Ковачеви)
  - Kukumeev (Кукумееви)
  - Maslyankov (Маслянкови)
  - Pangelov (Пангелови)
  - Patrikov (Патрикови)
  - Chuklev (Чуклеви)
  - Hinov (Хинови)
  - Glavanovi (Главанови)
  - Chonevi (Чоневи)
  - Kandevi (Къндеви)

== History ==
The land of Samovodene revealed early Neolithic settlements (6000 BC onwards) revealing a remarkably open house with an area of 120 m². A unique religious complex, consisting of a religious building and cult pit shaft with a radius of 1.80 m and a depth of 12.80 meters incurred in connection with the ritual practices of the cult of the sun and the Great Mother Goddess. Another finding was a plastic image of a young girl on the wall of pottery aged 8400 years, modeled in such a way that it was undistorted by later construction activities. This proves the existence of a division of labor and specialization in craft skills in early Neolithic settlements.

In the village there were two primary schools "Father Paysii" and "Tsar Simeon". In Samovodene was founded Credit cooperative "Strength", which was later renamed the consumer. Cooperative "Vasil Mavrikov" was created in 1945. Community center in the village Samovodene was founded in 1873.

=== Cultural and natural attractions ===
- In the village is private ethnographic museum "Maslyankovi and Sons" The museum occupies an area 500 m². It has over 800 exhibits. Free entrance. Welcomes visitors year-round, anytime.
- Near the center "Izvor" is a fountain built in memory of the fallen guerrillas Ivan Monkov and Kiril Tananeev.
- "Preobrazhenski Manastir" is a Monastery located 7 kilometers away from Veliko Tarnovo, near the left coast of Yantra River, at a walking distance away from Samovodene. The monastery dates back to the 14th century when it was founded by the queen Teodora-Sara and Ivan Shishman.

== Transport ==
Railway station is on the line Gorna Oryahovitsa - Veliko Tarnovo - Stara Zagora.

There is a regular bus line №10 of Gorna Oryahovitsa, Veliko Tarnovo and Parvomaytsi.

== Buildings ==
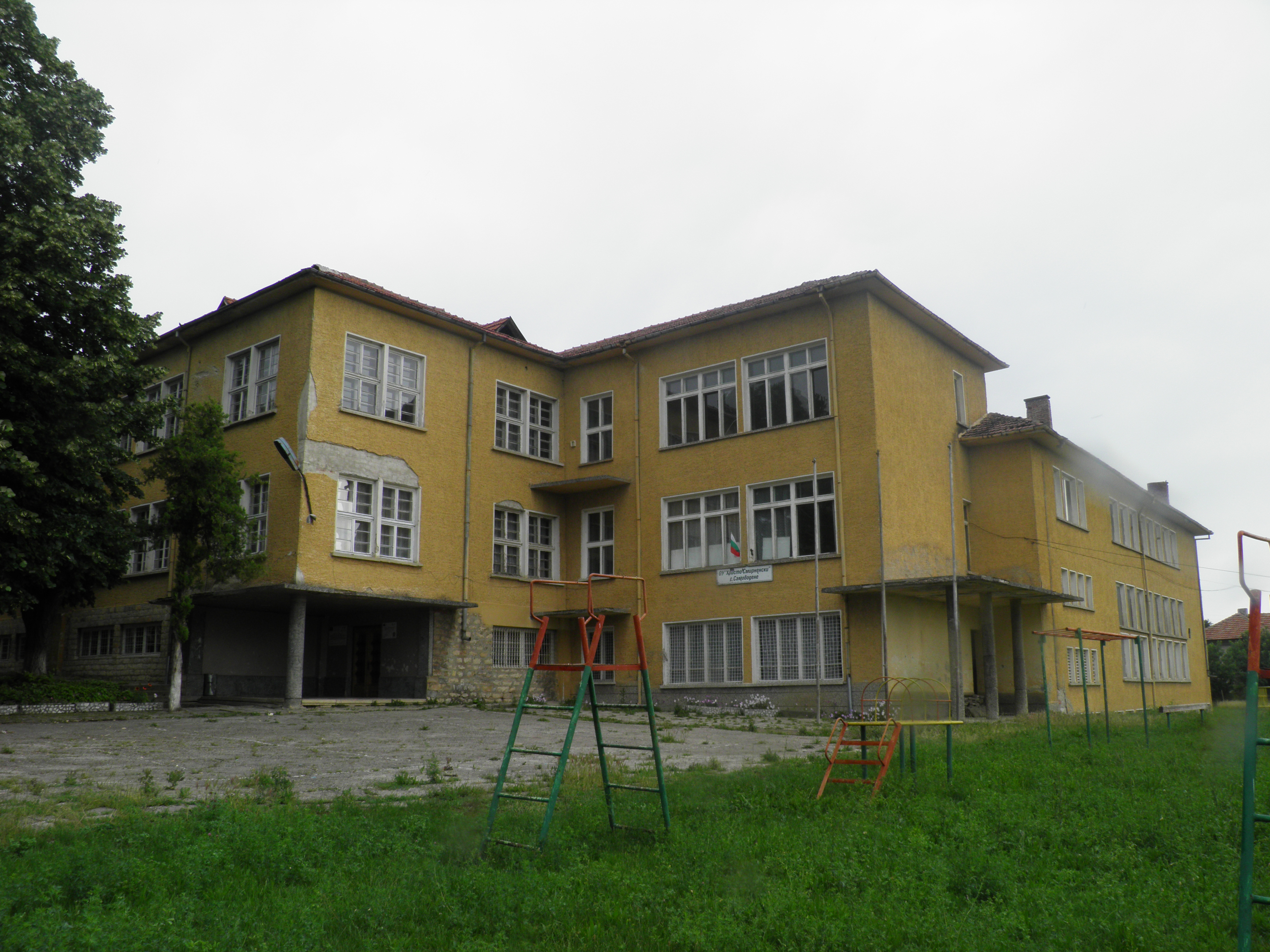
Hristo Smirnenski`s school in Samovodene

=== Education ===
- Primary School "Hristo Smirnenski" (Principal - Lilyana Getsova)
- Library "Izgrev" (Principal - Elka Petrova)
- Community Center "Izvor"
- Kindergarten "Samovodene"

=== Other ===
- Private Ethnographic Museum "Maslyankov and Sons"
- Club of pensioners and disabled people "Rodolyubets" (Principal - Vasilka Popova)
- Church "Saint Irene"
- Youth Centre

== Regular events ==
- The feast of the village is on 5 May. Then celebrate the Christian holiday "Saint Irene" is called and the church in the village.
- Every year on St. George ignite two large fire: one - one half of the village on the hill rocker and the other - the hill Mryamora by making a race which fire will be higher. For this purpose from the beginning of the year to collect tires and materials for bonfires. And most characteristic is that since he started the tradition, the fire on the hill rocker is always great!

== Sport ==
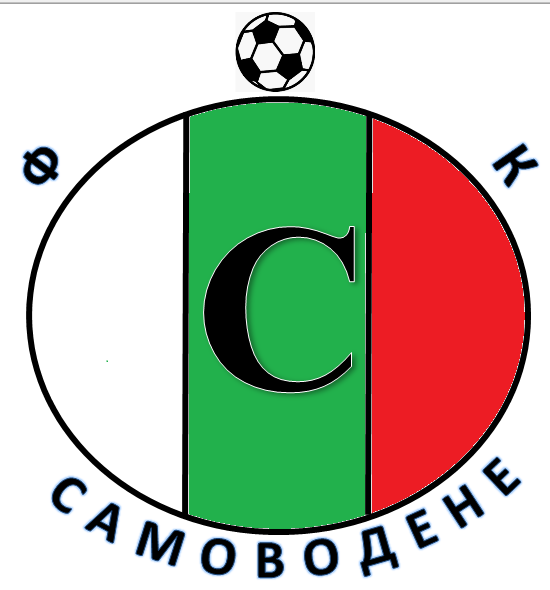
FC Sparta Samovodene

In the village Samovodene of about 65 years has soccer. The terraces of the stadium are about 300-400 spectators. The base is available to all Samovodene citizens.

The team of the village is called "Sparta" (FC Samovodene).

== Notable people ==
=== Born at the village ===
- Antoaneta Todorova - Retired female javelin thrower

=== Died at the village ===
- Trifon Ivanov (1965-2016)

== Other ==
- On 23/11/2009, BNT reported homeless old man grandfather Mitko helpless left without relatives willing to help him.
- On 07/12/2015, the Nova TV reported Lilly from Samovodene who died just days before turning 15 years.
- On 29/11/2016, the newspaper "Today" reported from the theater Samovodene who won the award in Serbia.
- On 07/12/2016, the Eurocom Tsarevets reported resident of the village of Samovodene which became a hit on social networks because of videos that they upload to the Internet.
- On 17.11.2016, the newspaper "Destant" reported Camellia Kandeva from Samovodene which is 16 years old and already has behind her numerous awards for modern ballet.
