= Novgrad =

Village in Bulgaria

Novgrad Новград
- Village
- Location in Bulgaria
- Coordinates: 43.5999985°N 25.5830002°E
- Country: Bulgaria
- Province: Rousse
- Municipality: Ivanovo
- Elevation: 48 m (157 ft)

Population (2021)
  - Total: 735

Novgrad (Bulgarian: Новград, pronounced [ˈnovgrd]; also transliterated Novgrad) is a village in the northeastern part of Bulgaria, close to the Bulgaria–Romania border. It is situated in the Ruse Province, and is a part of the Tsenovo Municipality, which lies in the western part the province. Novgrad is located along the lower course of the Yantra River, in the central Danubian Plain, 32 kilometres from Svishtov and 45 kilometres from the provincial capital of Ruse.

== Demographics ==
Ethnic composition of the village
1. Bulgarians (67.3%)
2. Turks (28.5%)
3. No identification (4.17%)
4. Others (0.41%)

In the 2011 census, Novgrad was home to a small population of 957 inhabitants. The vast majority of its population, or 67.2%, were ethnic Bulgarians, with a substantial minority of Turks (28.52%), while 4.17% of the population gave no identification of their ethnicity, and 0.41% were classified as "others".
