= Tsenovo, Ruse Province =

Tsenovo Ценово
- Village
- Location of Tsenovo
- Coordinates: 43°32′N 25°39′E
- Country: Bulgaria
- Province (Oblast): Ruse
- Municipality: Tsenovo

Government
  - Mayor: Vladimir Kalinov

Population (2008)
  - Total: 1,850
- Time zone: UTC+2 (EET)
  - Summer (DST): UTC+3 (EEST)
- Postal Code: 7139
- Area code: 08122

Tsenovo (Bulgarian: Ценово, pronounced [ˈt͡sɛnovo]; also transliterated Cenovo or Tzenovo) is a village in northeastern Bulgaria, part of Ruse Province. It is the administrative centre of Tsenovo Municipality, which lies in the western part of Ruse Province. It is located along the lower course of the Yantra River, in the central Danubian Plain, 32 kilometres from Svishtov and 45 kilometres from the provincial capital of Rousse.

The modern village was founded in the late 16th-early 17th century as the farm of the Gülhane Park administrator at the imperial palace of Topkapı in Istanbul, named Kara Ali. The settlement gradually grew, as many people settled around the inn; the village was first named Çauşhan and Çauşköy. Following the Liberation of Bulgaria, the name was Bulgarianized by the addition of the -evo suffix, turning it into Chaushevo. On 14 August 1934, it was renamed to Tsenovo in honour of the influential Svishtov merchant Dimitar Apostolov Tsenov who donated 40 million leva for the construction of the Svishtov University of Economics.
