= Tsenovo Municipality =

Tsenovo Municipality Община Ценово
- Municipality
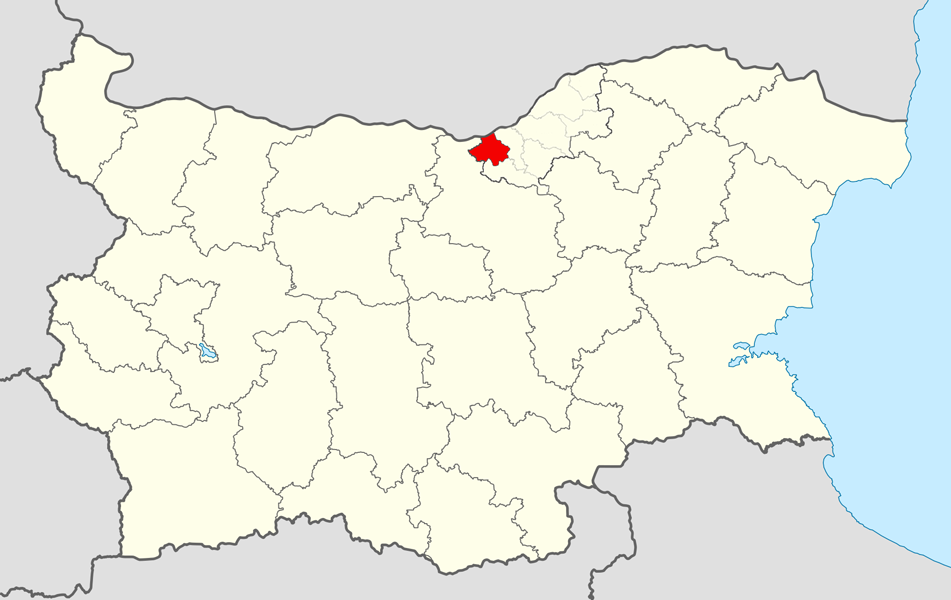
- Tsenovo Municipality within Bulgaria and Ruse Province.
- Coordinates: 43°33′N 25°36′E
- Country: Bulgaria
- Province (Oblast): Ruse
- Admin. centre (Obshtinski tsentar): Tsenovo

Area
  - Total: 249.7 km^{2} (96.4 sq mi)

Population (December 2009)
  - Total: 6,220
  - Density: 24.9/km^{2} (64.5/sq mi)
- Time zone: UTC+2 (EET)
  - Summer (DST): UTC+3 (EEST)

Tsenovo Municipality (Bulgarian: Община Ценово) is a small municipality (obshtina) in Ruse Province, Central-North Bulgaria, located along the right bank of Danube river in the Danubian Plain where Yantra river flows into the Danube. It is named after its administrative centre - the village of Tsenovo.

The municipality embraces a territory of 249.73 km^{2} (96.42 sq mi) with a population of 6,220 inhabitants, as of December 2009.

== Settlements ==
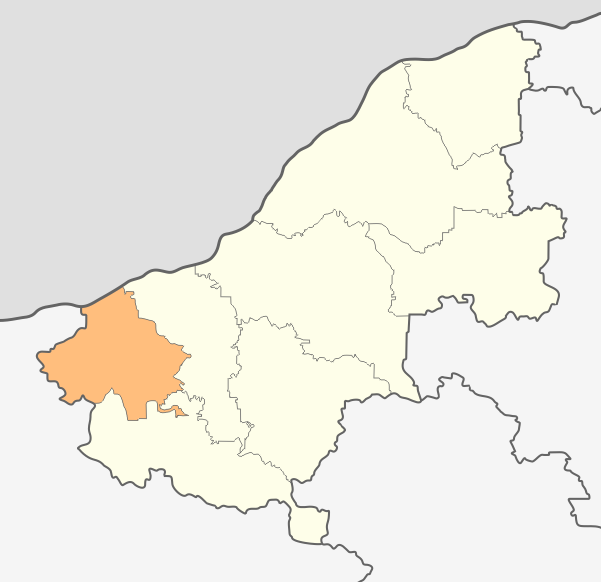
Tsenovo Municipality within Ruse Province

Tsenovo Municipality includes the following 9 places, all of them villages:

Town/Village	Cyrillic	Population (December 2009)
Tsenovo	Ценово	1,673
Beltsov	Белцов	473
Belyanovo	Беляново	145
Dolna Studena	Долна Студена	823
Dzhulyunitsa	Джулюница	286
Karamanovo	Караманово	995
Krivina	Кривина	466
Novgrad	Новград	954
Piperkovo	Пиперково	405
Total		6,220

== Demography ==
The following table shows the change of the population during the last four decades.

Tsenovo Municipality
Year	1975	1985	1992	2001	2005	2007	2009	2011
Population	12,857	10,875	9,472	7,975	7,023	6,639	6,220	...
Sources: Census 2001, Census 2011, „pop-stat.mashke.org“,

=== Religion ===
According to the latest Bulgarian census of 2011, the religious composition, among those who answered the optional question on religious identification, was the following:

Religious composition of Tsenovo Municipality
Orthodox Christianity	81.1%
Catholicism	0.7%
Protestantism	0.9%
Islam	5.4%
No religion	6.4%
Prefer not to answer, others and indefinable	5.5%

== See also ==
- Provinces of Bulgaria
- Municipalities of Bulgaria
- List of cities and towns in Bulgaria
