= Vardim Island =

Third largest Bulgarian Danubian island

Vardim Island (Bulgarian: остров Вардим, ostrov Vardim) is the third largest Bulgarian Danubian island (after Belene Island and Kozloduy Island). Located east of the town of Svishtov, opposite the village of Vardim (in Svishtov municipality, Veliko Tarnovo Province) and part of the Belene Danubian Archipelago, it is a protected wetland and bird nesting area of national importance.

The island lies about 300 metres (980 feet) north of the Bulgarian bank of the Danube, between the 542nd and 546th kilometre from the origin of the river. An inlet-type forest often forms when a part of the island is flooded during the spring high water.

Vardim Rocks at Hell Gates in Livingston Island, South Shetland Islands in Antarctica are named after Vardim Island and the adjacent settlement of Vardim.

== Biodiversity ==
Besides the Vardim oak, a specific hygrophile type of summer oak, other types of oak and elm can be observed on Vardim Island, as well as the white willow, white poplar, black acacia, black poplar, snowflake, etc.

According to the Bulgarian Society for the Protection of Birds, the island is one of the five most important nesting areas in the country for the great cormorant, the black-crowned night heron and the common spoonbill, making it a site of international ornithological importance. A total of 21 nationally protected species nidificate on the island. Of the 75 bird species that can be observed on Vardim Island, 31 are of European importance: 2 fall into category SPEC1, 11 in SPEC2 and 18 in SPEC3. The sea eagle can be seen on the island, and until 1985 other species to be observed on it included the squacco heron, glossy ibis and pygmy cormorant.

== The Old Oak ==
The Old Oak
- Interactive map of The Old Oak
- Location: Veliko Tarnovo Province, Bulgaria
- Nearest city: Svishtov
- Coordinates: 43°37′N 25°28′E
- Area: 0.987 km^{2} (0.381 sq mi)
- Established: 2 July 1998

In order to protect the natural Vardim oak plantations and the large number of waders, The Old Oak area was proclaimed a natural reserve on 5 March 1971 by the Ministry of Forests and Forest Industry. The reserve spreads over an area of 0.718 km^{2}, of which 0.646 afforested and 0.072 unforested. On 2 July 1998 it was recategorized as a protected area with an area of 0.987 km^{2} by the Committee for the Preservation of the Environment with the Council of Ministers of Bulgaria.
