= Byala, Ruse Province =

Byala Бяла
- Town
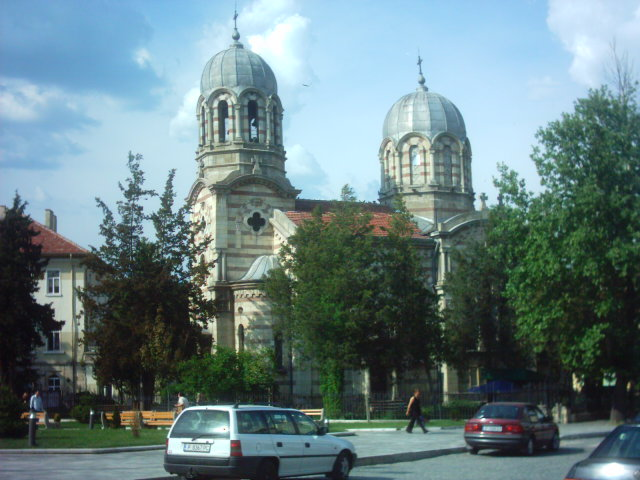
- Church of St George

- Location of Byala, Rousse Province
- Coordinates: 43°27′N 25°44′E
- Country: Bulgaria
- Province (Oblast): Rousse
- Municipality: Byala

Government
  - Mayor: Yuri Simeonov
- Elevation: 54 m (177 ft)

Population (31.12.2009)
  - Total: 9,015
- Time zone: UTC+2 (EET)
  - Summer (DST): UTC+3 (EEST)
- Postal Code: 7100
- Area code: 08121

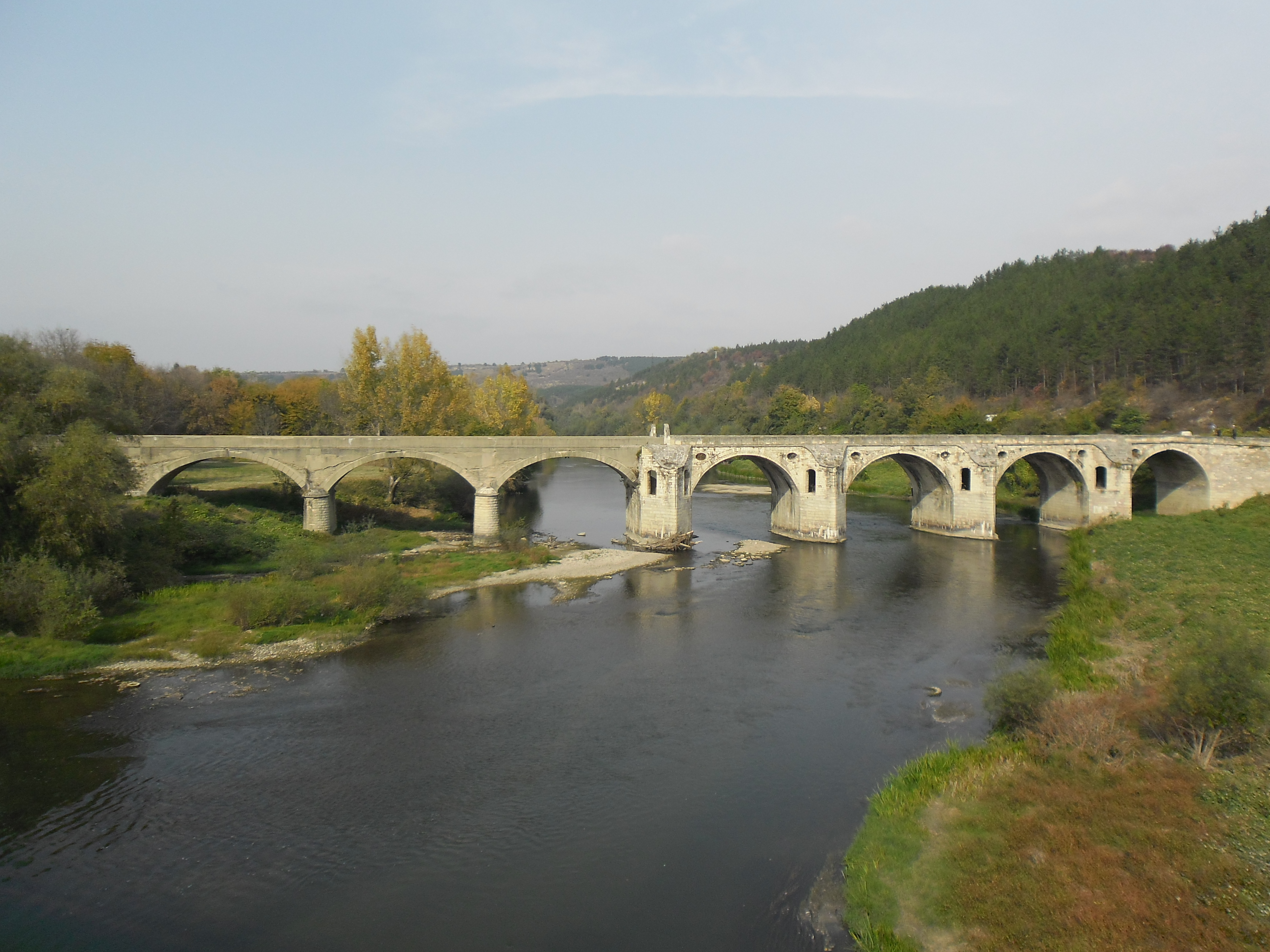
Byala bridge

Byala (Bulgarian: Бяла [ˈbʲałɐ]) is a town in Ruse Province, Northern Bulgaria. It is the administrative centre of the homonymous Byala Municipality. The town is located on the crossroad between roads that connect Ruse with Veliko Tarnovo and Pleven with Varna. Close to it is the town of Borovo. The noted Belenski most (Byala Bridge) over the Yantra River is located in the vicinity. The Liberation War Museum dedicated to the Russo-Turkish War can also be found in the town. As of December 2009, Byala had a population of 9,015.

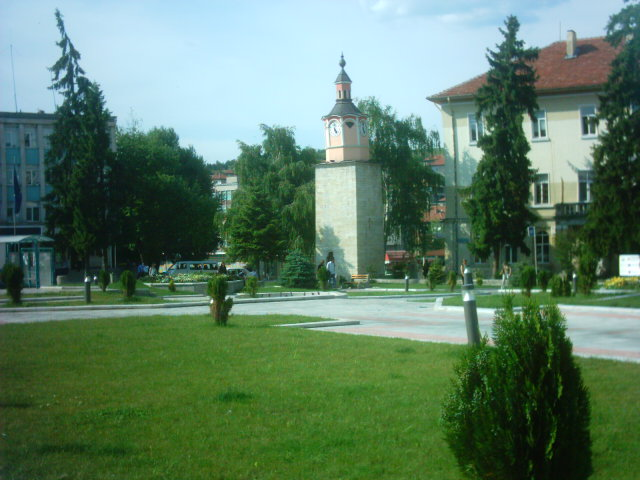
Clock tower in Byala

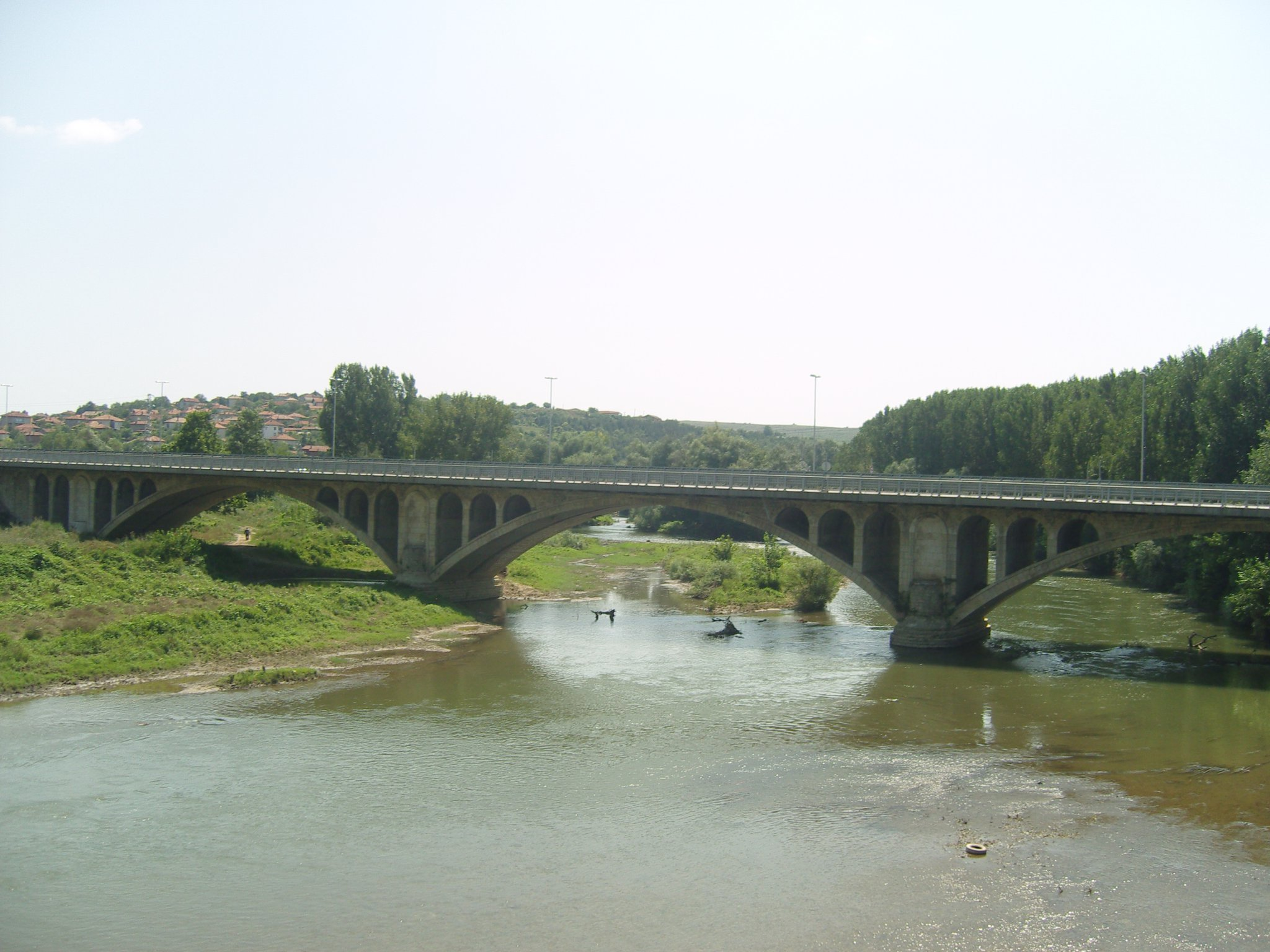
Road bridge in front of Byala bridge

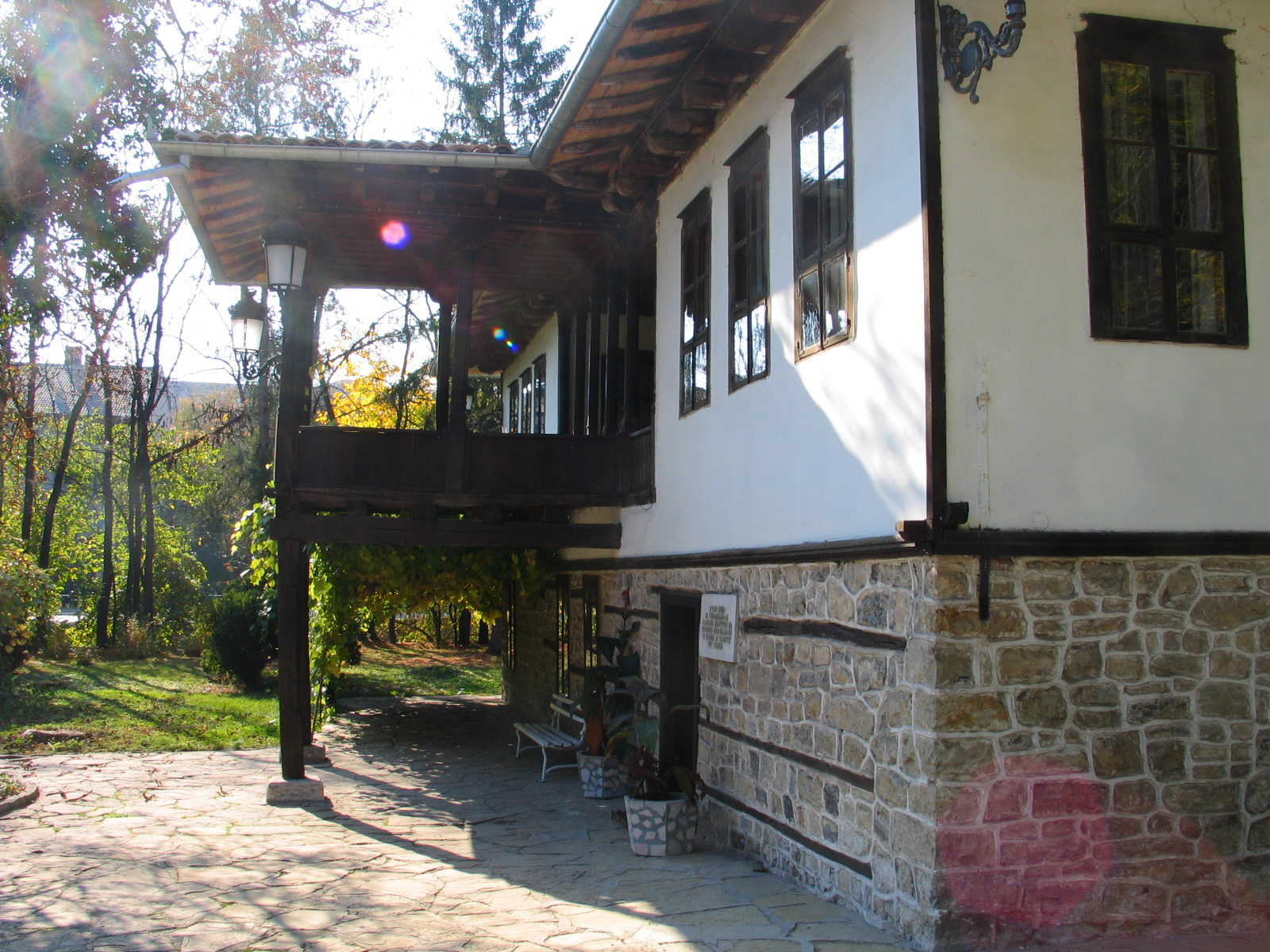
Liberation War Museum

== Incidents ==
- A major traffic accident on 7 December 2006 on a different bridge over the river claimed 18 lives, as a truck hit a bus travelling between Byala and its railway station, causing the bus to fall 15 m (49 ft) down from the bridge.

== Notable people ==
- Refet Bele (1881 – 3 October 1963), also known as Refet Bey or Refet Pasha, was a Turkish military commander. He served in the Ottoman Army and the Turkish Army, where he retired as a general. His grandfather was from Byala.
