= Vardim =

Vardim Вардим
- Village
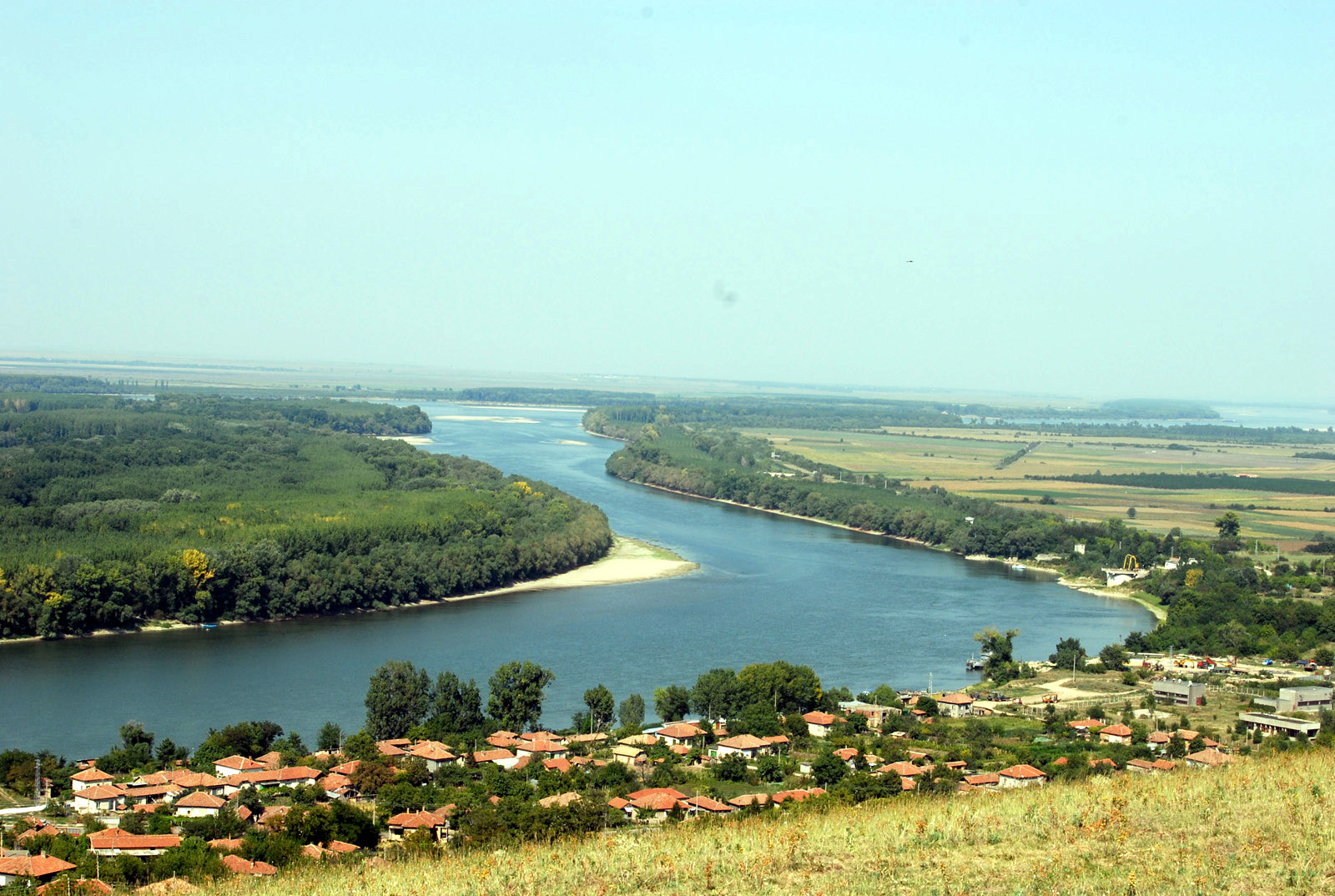

- Location of Vardim, Bulgaria
- Coordinates: 43°36′42.89″N 25°28′11.66″E
- Country: Bulgaria
- Province: Veliko Tarnovo Province
- Municipality: Svishtov

Government
  - Mayor: Senka Dobreva
- Elevation: 40 m (130 ft)

Population (2022)
  - Total: 856
- Time zone: UTC+2 (EET)
  - Summer (DST): UTC+3 (EEST)
- Postal Code: 5281
- Area codes: 06324 from Bulgaria, 003596324 from outside

Vardim (Bulgarian: Вардим) is a village in Svishtov Municipality, Veliko Tarnovo Province, north central Bulgaria, located on the right bank of the Danube river. The village of Vardim is located in the central part of the Danubian plain about 10 km east of Svishtov towards Ruse. The village is believed to date back to the time of the Thracians and Slavs and shows significant remains from subsequent Roman inhabitants, particularly in the nearby Roman town of Novae which has been dated to 45 AD and is considered to be the most examined Roman camp in Bulgaria.

Opposite the village is the Vardim Island Natural Reserve which is popular with birdwatchers as the island is a nesting site for the great cormorant, the black-crowned night heron, the common spoonbill and 21 nationally protected bird species. The reserve, which is located on what is known locally as Big Vardim Island, is managed by the Bulgarian Society for the Protection of Birds which observes the nesting habits and populations of bird species on the island. This reserve is neighbored by two smaller islands known as Small Vardim Island and Haidushki Island.

Vardim is a major launching point for tourist expeditions which frequent the popular white sand beaches of Vardim Island during the summer.
