= Zlatarishka reka =

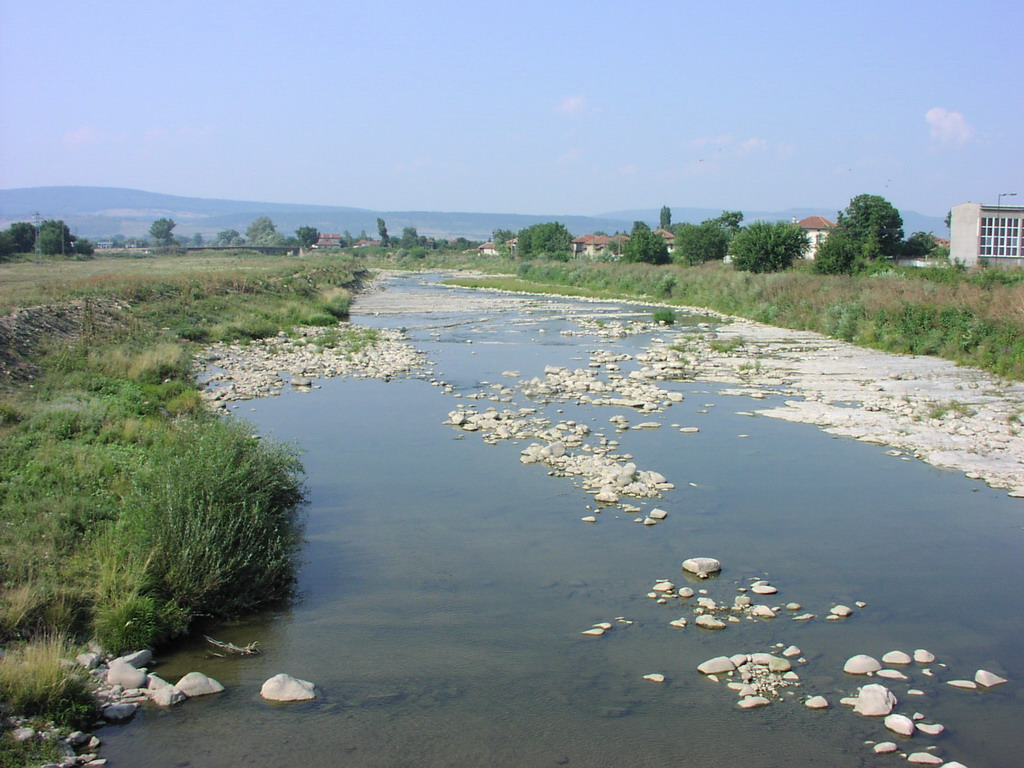

Location
- Country: Bulgaria

Physical characteristics
- Source
  - location: N of Chumerna, Balkan Mountains
  - coordinates: 42°47′21.12″N 25°57′38.16″E
  - elevation: 1,315 m (4,314 ft)
- Mouth
  - location: Veselina
  - coordinates: 43°4′4.08″N 25°52′54.84″E
  - elevation: 85 m (279 ft)
- Length: 56.5 km (35.1 mi)
- Basin size: 187 km^{2} (72 sq mi)

Basin features
- Progression: Veselina→ Stara reka→ Yantra→ Danube→ Black Sea

The Zlatarishka reka (Bulgarian: Златаришка река) is a 56.5 km-long river in northern Bulgaria, a right tributary of the Veselina, itself a right tributary of the river Stara reka of the Yantra. It is the largest tributary of the Veselina.

The Zlatarishka reka takes its source under the name Zelenishka reka at an altitude of 1,315 m some 300 m north of the Chumerna refuge in the Elena–Tvarditsa division of the Balkan Mountains and flows in general direction north throughout its whole course. Until the village of Ruhovtsi it flows in a deep forested valley, which eventually widens as it runs through the eastern parts of the Elena Valley. It then bisects the Elena Heights in the 10 km long Boaza Gorge. Downstream of the gorge the valley widens again, the river passes through Zlataritsa and some 1.6 km north of the town flows into the Veselina at an altitude of 85 m.

Its drainage basin covers a territory of 187 km^{2} or 21.2% of the Veselina's total. High water is in March–June and low water is in July–October.

The river flows entirely in Veliko Tarnovo Province. There are two towns and five villages along its course: Miykovtsi, Hanevtsi, Ruhovtsi, Karandili, Maryan, Dolni Maryan and the town of Elena in Elena Municipality, as well as the town of Zlataritsa in Zlataritsa Municipality. A 10.5 km section of the second class II-53 road Polikraishte–Sliven–Yambol–Sredets follows the river's gorge through the Elena Heights.
