= Veselina (river) =

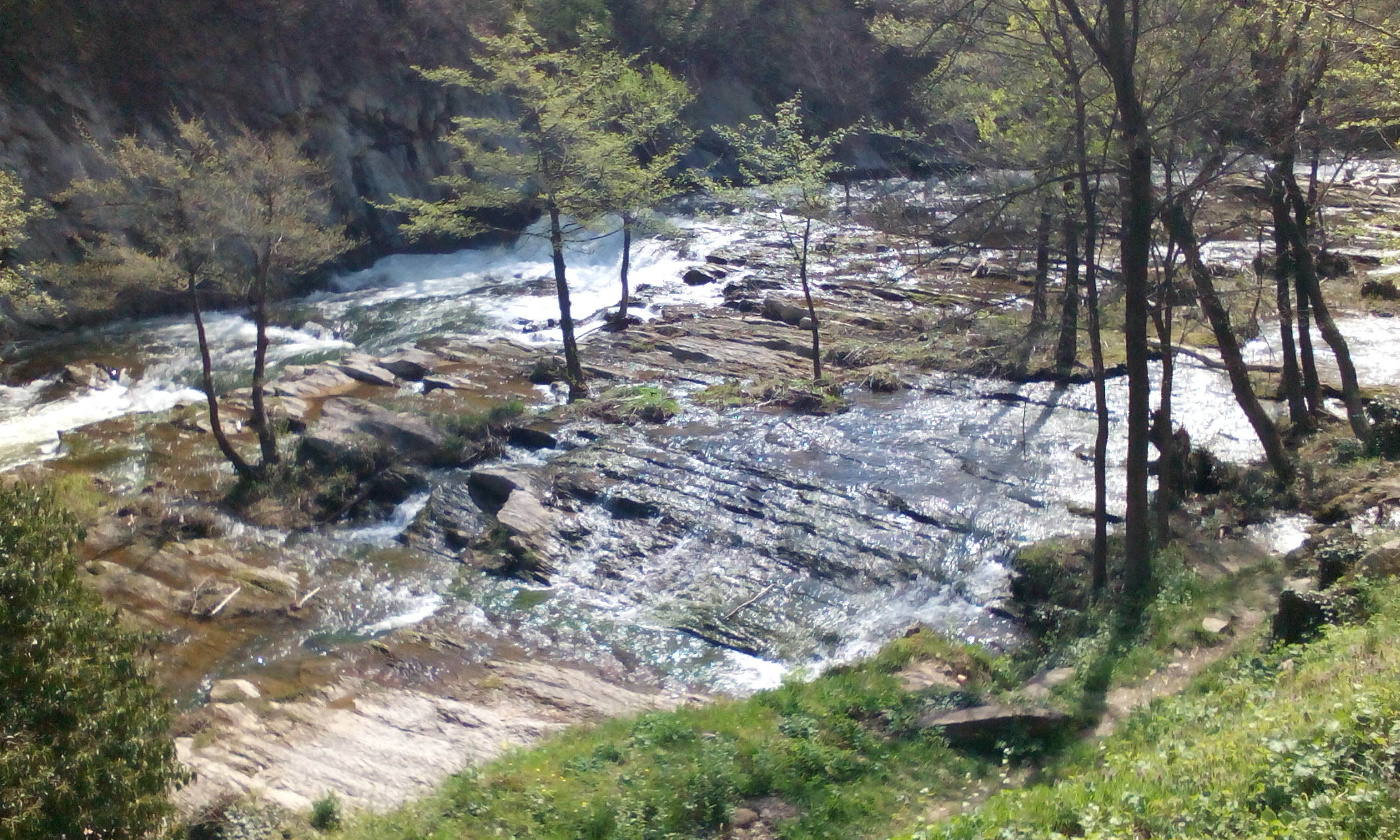

Location
- Country: Bulgaria

Physical characteristics
- Source
  - location: SW of Drenta, Balkan Mountains
  - coordinates: 42°47′25.08″N 25°43′23.88″E
  - elevation: 784 m (2,572 ft)
- Mouth
  - location: Stara reka
  - coordinates: 43°9′41.04″N 25°54′38.88″E
  - elevation: 64 m (210 ft)
- Length: 70 km (43 mi)
- Basin size: 882 km^{2} (341 sq mi)

Basin features
- Progression: Stara reka→ Yantra→ Danube→ Black Sea

The Veselina (Bulgarian: Веселина) is a 70 km-long river in northern Bulgaria, a left tributary of the Stara reka, itself a right tributary of the river Yantra of the Danube basin. It is the second largest tributary of the Stara reka, after the Golyama reka.

== Geography ==
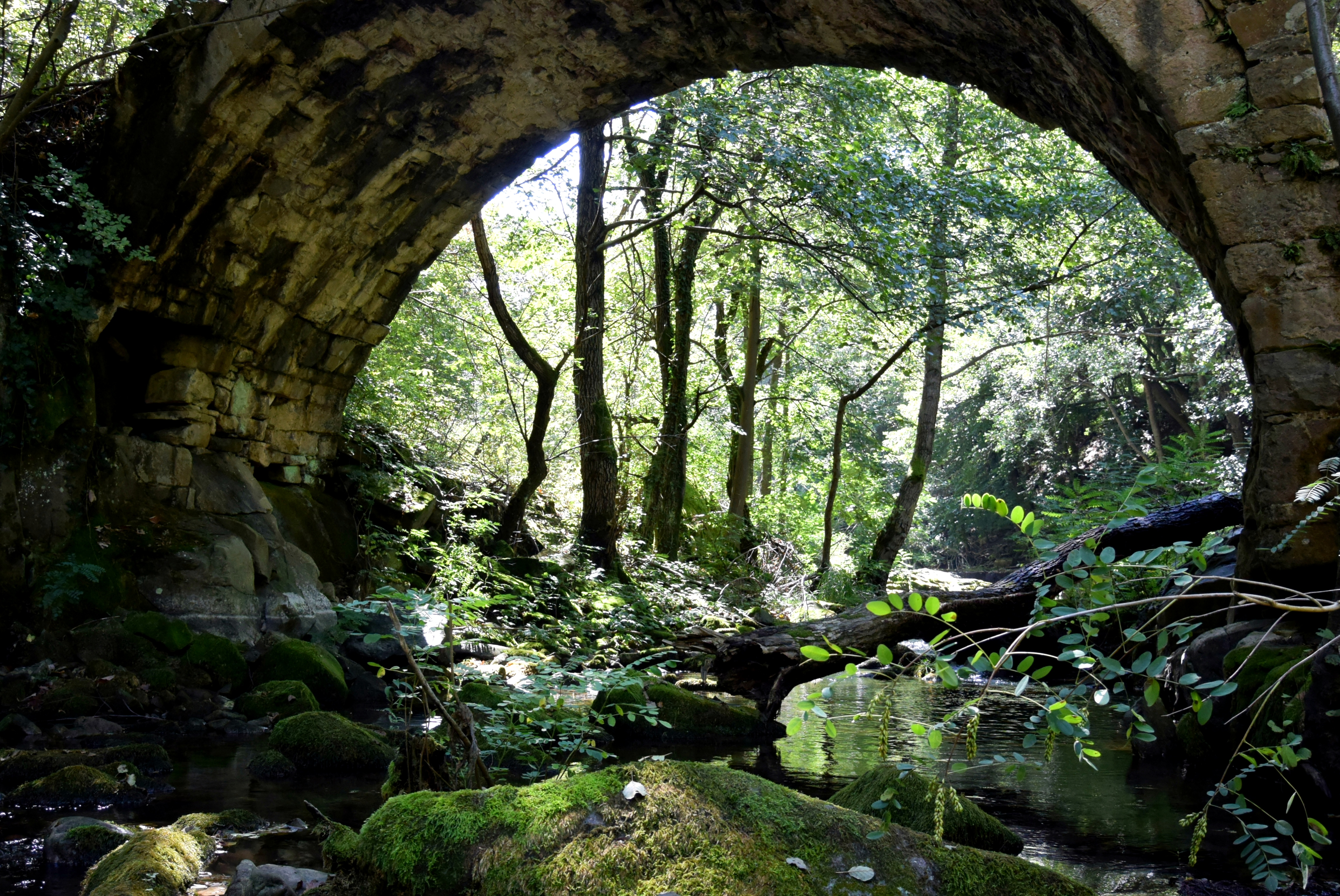
A bridge on the Veselina

The Veselina takes its source at an altitude of 784 m southwest of the village of Drenta in the Elena–Tvarditsa division of the Balkan Mountains. It heads northeast until the village of Dobrevtsi and then flows north in a deep forested valley until reaching the Yovkovtsi Reservoir. After flowing out of the reservoir close to the Kapinovо Monastery the river cuts through the Elena Heights in a picturesque 4 km gorge. Downstream of the monastery it turns northeast and the valley widens, supporting farmlands. After the confluence with its tributary the Bebrovska reka, the Veselina turns north and flows into the Stara reka at an altitude of 64 m some 2.2 km north of the village of Dzhulyunitsa, close to the first class I-4 road Yablanitsa–Veliko Tarnovo–Varna.

Its drainage basin covers a territory of 882 km^{2} or 35.9% of the Stara reka's total. Its largest tributary is the 56.5 km long Zlatarishka reka.

High water is in March–June and low water is in July–October. The average annual discharge at the Yovkovtsi Reservoir is 2.3 m^{3}/s.

== Ecology ==
Part of the river course between the villages of Kapinovo and Mindya is included in the protected area River Veselina, which was established in 2012 with a territory of 0.99 km^{2}. There are mixed riparian forests of alder, willow, poplar and oak species with communities of moisture-loving vegetation along the river.

There are numerous other aquatic animals, such as Eurasian otter, European pond turtle, Balkan crested newt, smooth newt, yellow-bellied toad, fire salamander, European tree frog, Balkan golden loach, etc. Many bird species are also under protection in the area, including common buzzard, Eurasian sparrowhawk, Eurasian hobby, Eurasian scops owl, grey heron, little bittern, black stork, corn crake, common moorhen, green sandpiper, common kingfisher, European bee-eater, grey-headed woodpecker, great reed warbler, barred warbler, ortolan bunting, etc.

== Settlements and tourism ==
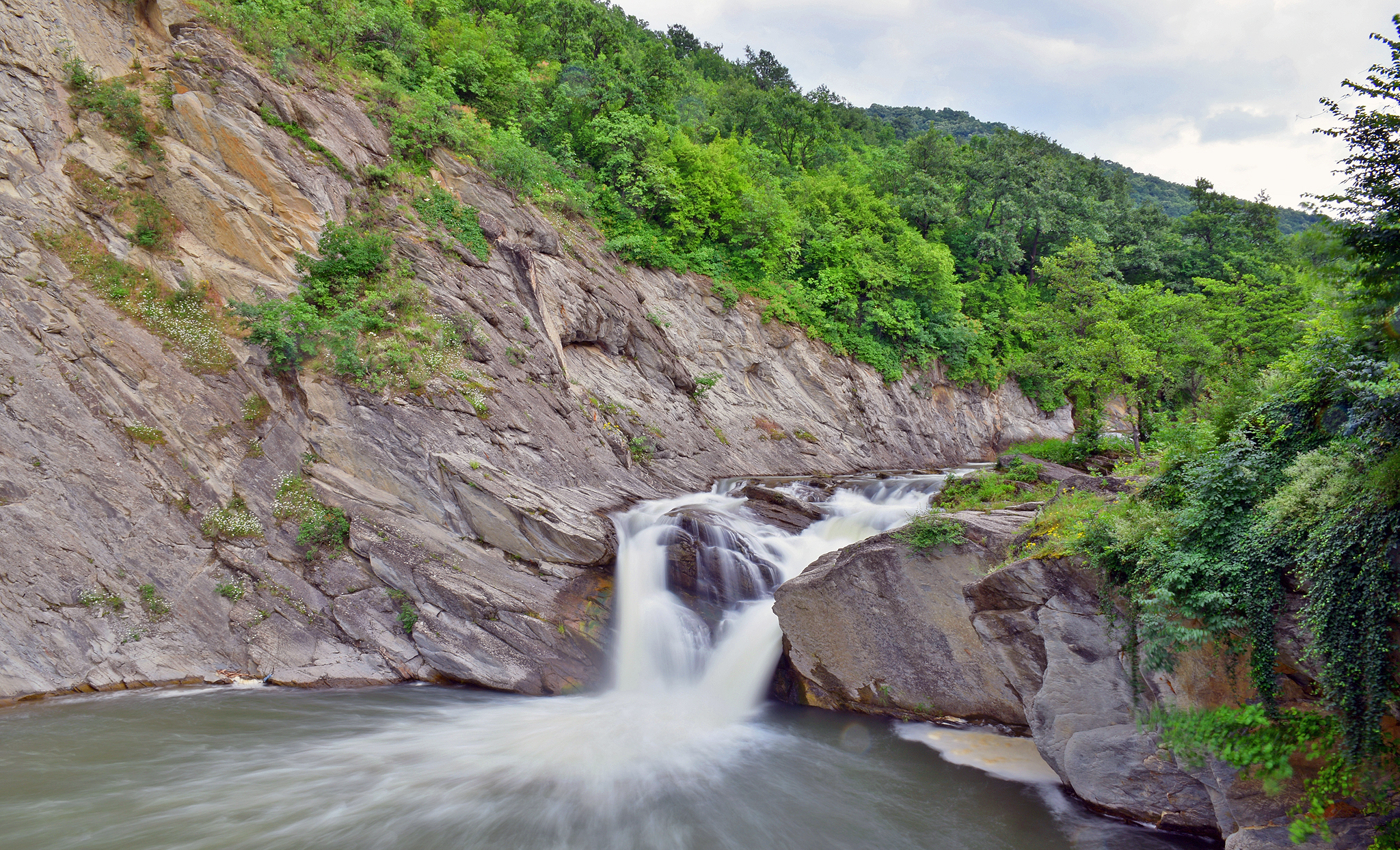
Kapinovo waterfall on the Veselina

The river flows entirely in Veliko Tarnovo Province. There are one town and nine villages along its course: Drenta, Todyuvtsi, Sultani, Karandili, Mirchovtsi and Bagalevtsi in Elena Municipality, Kapinovo and Mindya in Veliko Tarnovo Municipality, the town of Zlataritsa in Zlataritsa Municipality, and Dzhulyunitsa in Lyaskovets Municipality. Along the upper course of the Veselina is located the large Yovkovtsi Reservoir, which regulates the water supply to the city of Veliko Tarnovo and many settlements in the region. It is also an attractive spot for tourism, angling and sports, with numerous hotels and guest houses constructed near its shores.

On the river's left bank near the northern entrance of the gorge through the Elena Heights is situated the Kapinovo Monastery. Although most of the current buildings date from the 19th century, the monastery was established in 1272 in the reign of emperor Konstantin Tih during the Second Bulgarian Empire. Close to the cloister is the small Kapinovo waterfall.

A 10.4 km stretch of the third class III-4004 follows the river's right bank in this lower course between Dzhulyunitsa and the intersection for the village of Rodina.
