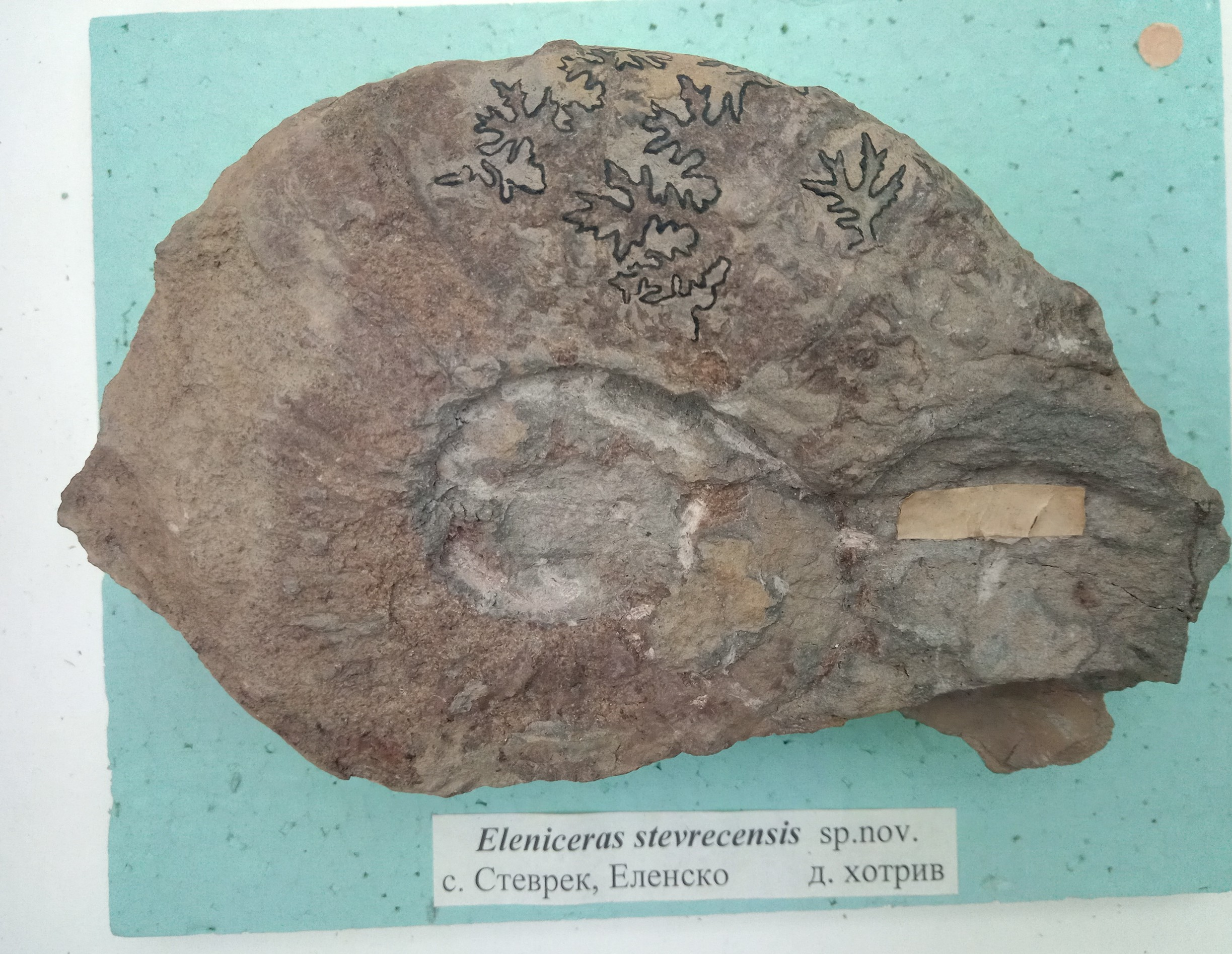
- Eleniceras stevrecensis sp. nov., Lower Hauterivian, Stevrek, (Coll. St. Breskovski) at the Sofia University "St. Kliment Ohridski" Museum of Paleontology and Historical Geology

Scientific classification
- Kingdom: Animalia
- Phylum: Mollusca
- Class: Cephalopoda
- Subclass: †Ammonoidea
- Order: †Ammonitida
- Family: †Neocomitidae
- Genus: †Eleniceras; Breskovski, 1967

Species
- Eleniceras nikolovi; Eleniceras stevrecensis; Eleniceras tchechitevi; Eleniceras transsylvanicum

= Eleniceras =

Eleniceras Temporal range: Hauterivian Hauterivian

Genus of molluscs (fossil)

Eleniceras is an extinct genus of cephalopods belonging to the Ammonoidea subclass.

== Description ==
The genus was named after the Bulgarian town of Elena. The holotype is Eleniceras stevrecensis. There are several described species of Eleniceras, including E. nikolovi, E. stevrecensis, E. tchechitevi, E. transsylvanicum.

== Distribution ==
This animal lived 140–129 million years ago during the Hauterivian in Europe and Tunisia.

== See also ==
- List of ammonite genera
