= Yovkovtsi =

Yovkovtsi Reservoir
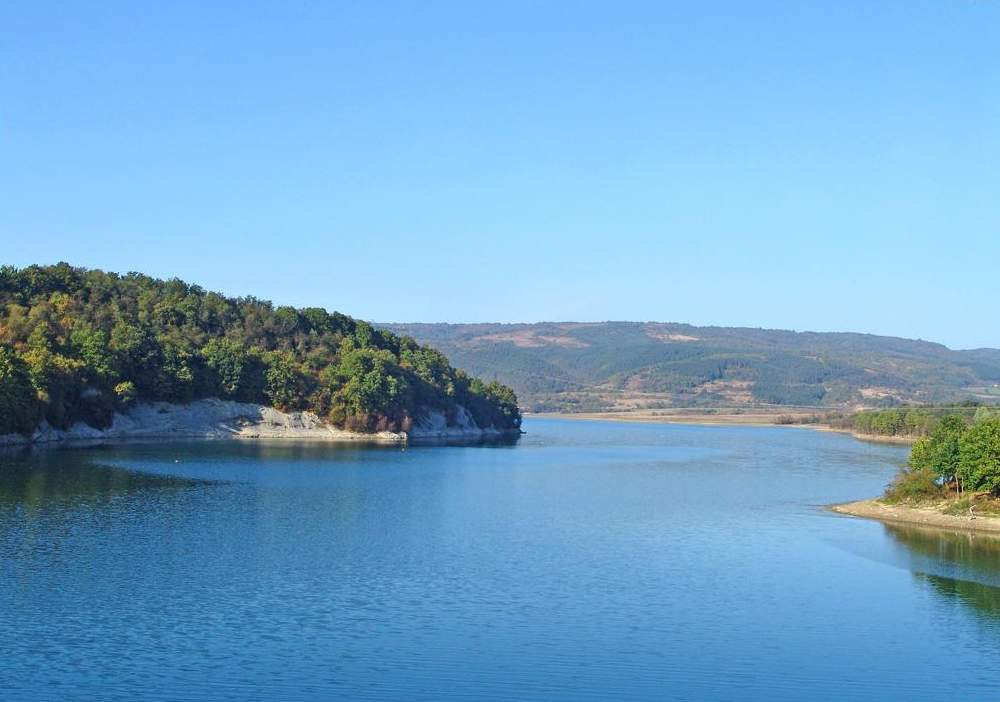

- Location within Bulgaria
- Coordinates: 42.931°N 25.797°E
- Lake type: reservoir
- Primary inflows: Veselina River
- Primary outflows: Veselina River
- Basin countries: Bulgaria
- Max. length: 7.5 km (4.7 mi) (from map)
- Max. width: 850 m (2,790 ft)
- Surface area: 574 ha (1,420 acres)
- Max. depth: 60 m (200 ft) (from dam)
- Water volume: 92.2 hm^{3} (74,700 acre⋅ft)

The Yovkovtsi Reservoir (Bulgarian: язовир „Йовковци“) is situated in northern Bulgaria, 5 kilometres (3.1 mi) away of the town of Elena. It was built on the river Veselina in the Yantra basin. The reservoir is located in the territory of Elena municipality, and supplies water to Veliko Tarnovo, Gorna Oryahovitsa, Lyaskovets, Strazhitsa, Zlataritsa, Elena, Gabrovo and Dryanovo. 223 square kilometres (86 sq mi) of the reservoir are hygienic protected zone. The dam is rich in carp, pikeperch and many other kinds of fish.

It is named after the prominent writer Yordan Yovkov.
