= Stara reka (Yantra) =

Location
- Country: Bulgaria

Physical characteristics
- Source
  - location: NE of Aglikina Polyana, Balkan Mountains
  - coordinates: 42°49′17.04″N 26°9′25.92″E
  - elevation: 964 m (3,163 ft)
- Mouth
  - location: Yantra
  - coordinates: 43°12′11.88″N 25°49′37.92″E
  - elevation: 56 m (184 ft)
- Length: 92 km (57 mi)
- Basin size: 2,458 km^{2} (949 sq mi)

Basin features
- Progression: Yantra→ Danube→ Black Sea

The Stara reka (Bulgarian: Стара река) is a 92 km-long river in northern Bulgaria, a right tributary of the river Yantra, itself a right tributary of the Danube. It is the second largest tributary of the Yantra, after the Rositsa.

The Stara reka takes its source under the name Golema reka at an altitude of 964 m, northeast of the Aglikina Polyana locality west of the Vratnik Pass in the Elena–Tvarditsa division of the Balkan Mountains. It initially flows in a deep forested valley, which widens until reaching the village of Maysko. Then, for more than 60 km between Maysko and Kesarevo the valley is deep and in places gorge-like, cutting through the Elena Heights to the west and the Lisa Mountain to the east. After Kesarevo the Stara reka enters the Danubian Plain, the valley widens significantly and the river forms meanders. In this section it takes its largest tributaries, the Golyama reka and the Veselina. The river flows into the Yantra at an altitude of 56 m some 700 m southwest of the village of Gorski Dolen Trambesh.

Its drainage basin covers a territory of 2,458 km^{2} or 31.3% of the Yantra's total. Its largest tributaries are the Golyama reka (75 km) and the Veselina (70 km).

High water is in April–June and low water is in August–October. The average annual discharge is 4.6 m^{3}/s at the village of Slivovitsa and reaches 15.8 m^{3}/s at Bryagovitsa, after receiving its major tributaries.

The river flows in Sliven, Targovishte and Veliko Tarnovo Provinces. There are eight villages along its course: Stara Reka in Sliven Province, Stevrek and Stara Rechka in Targovishte Province, and Maysko, Chesma, Slivovitsa, Kesarevo and Bryagovitsa in Veliko Tarnovo Province. The river is clear and the rock formations along the river banks are favourable for tourism. Its waters in the lower course are utilized for irrigation in the Danube Plain.

There are two main roads along its valley, a 6.4 km stretch of the first class I-4 road Yablanitsa–Veliko Tarnovo–Varna, Bulgaria and an 18.4 km section of the second class II-53 road Polikraishte–Sliven–Yambol–Sredets.
