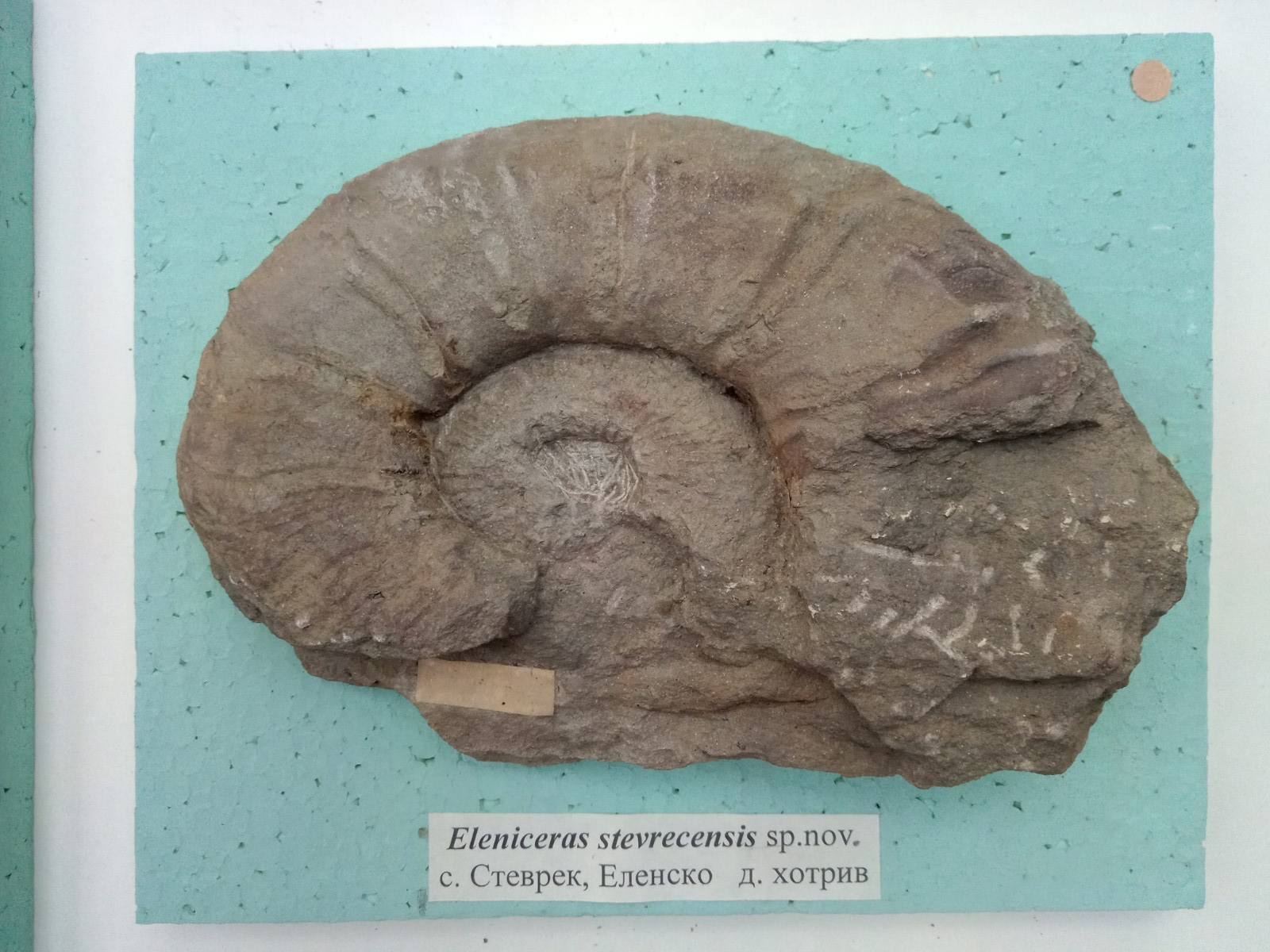
- Eleniceras stevrecensis sp. nov., Lower Hauterivian, Stevrek, (Coll. St. Breskovski) at the Sofia University "St. Kliment Ohridski" Museum of Paleontology and Historical Geology

Scientific classification
- Kingdom: Animalia
- Phylum: Mollusca
- Class: Cephalopoda
- Subclass: †Ammonoidea
- Order: †Ammonitida
- Family: †Neocomitidae
- Genus: †Eleniceras
- Species: †E. stevrecensis

Binomial name
- †Eleniceras stevrecensis Breskovski, 1967

= Eleniceras stevrecensis =

Eleniceras stevrecensis Temporal range: Hauterivian Hauterivian

Species of molluscs (fossil)

Eleniceras stevrecensis is an extinct species of cephalopods belonging to the Ammonoidea subclass. This animal lived 140–129 million years ago during the Hauterivian in Europe.

== Etymology ==
The specific name, stevrecensis, is in honour of the Bulgarian village of Stevrek.
