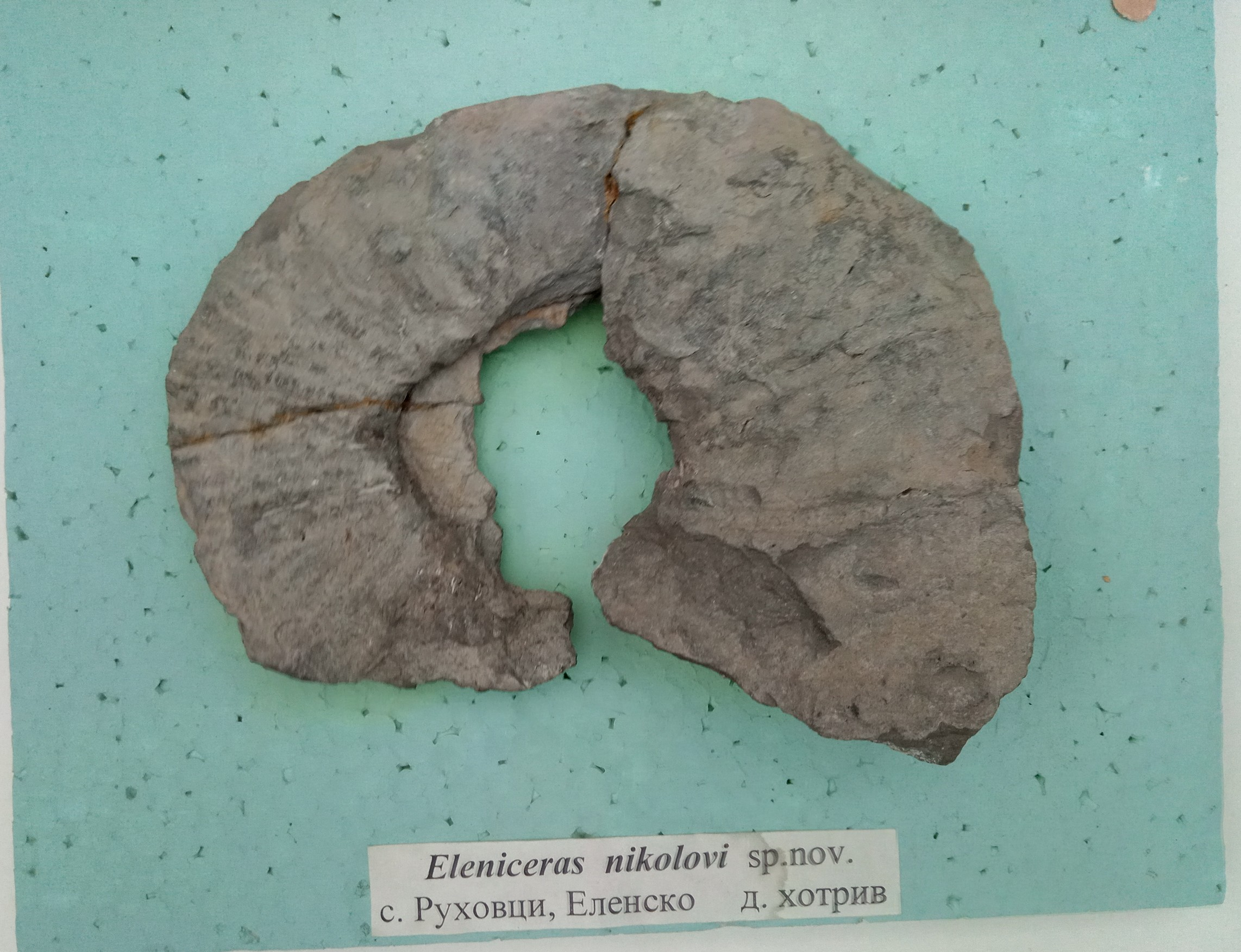
- Eleniceras nikolovi, Lower Hauterivian, Rouchovtzi, Elena, (Coll. St. Breskovski) at the Sofia University "St. Kliment Ohridski" Museum of Paleontology and Historical Geology

Scientific classification
- Domain: Eukaryota
- Kingdom: Animalia
- Phylum: Mollusca
- Class: Cephalopoda
- Subclass: †Ammonoidea
- Order: †Ammonitida
- Family: †Neocomitidae
- Genus: †Eleniceras
- Species: †E. nikolovi

Binomial name
- †Eleniceras nikolovi Breskovski, 1967

= Eleniceras nikolovi =

Eleniceras nikolovi Temporal range: Hauterivian Hauterivian

Species of molluscs (fossil)

Eleniceras nikolovi is an extinct species of cephalopods belonging to the Ammonoidea subclass. This animal lived 140–129 million years ago during the Hauterivian in Europe.

== Etymology ==
The specific name, nikolovi, is in honour of Todor Nikolov, who was a Bulgarian palaeontologist.
