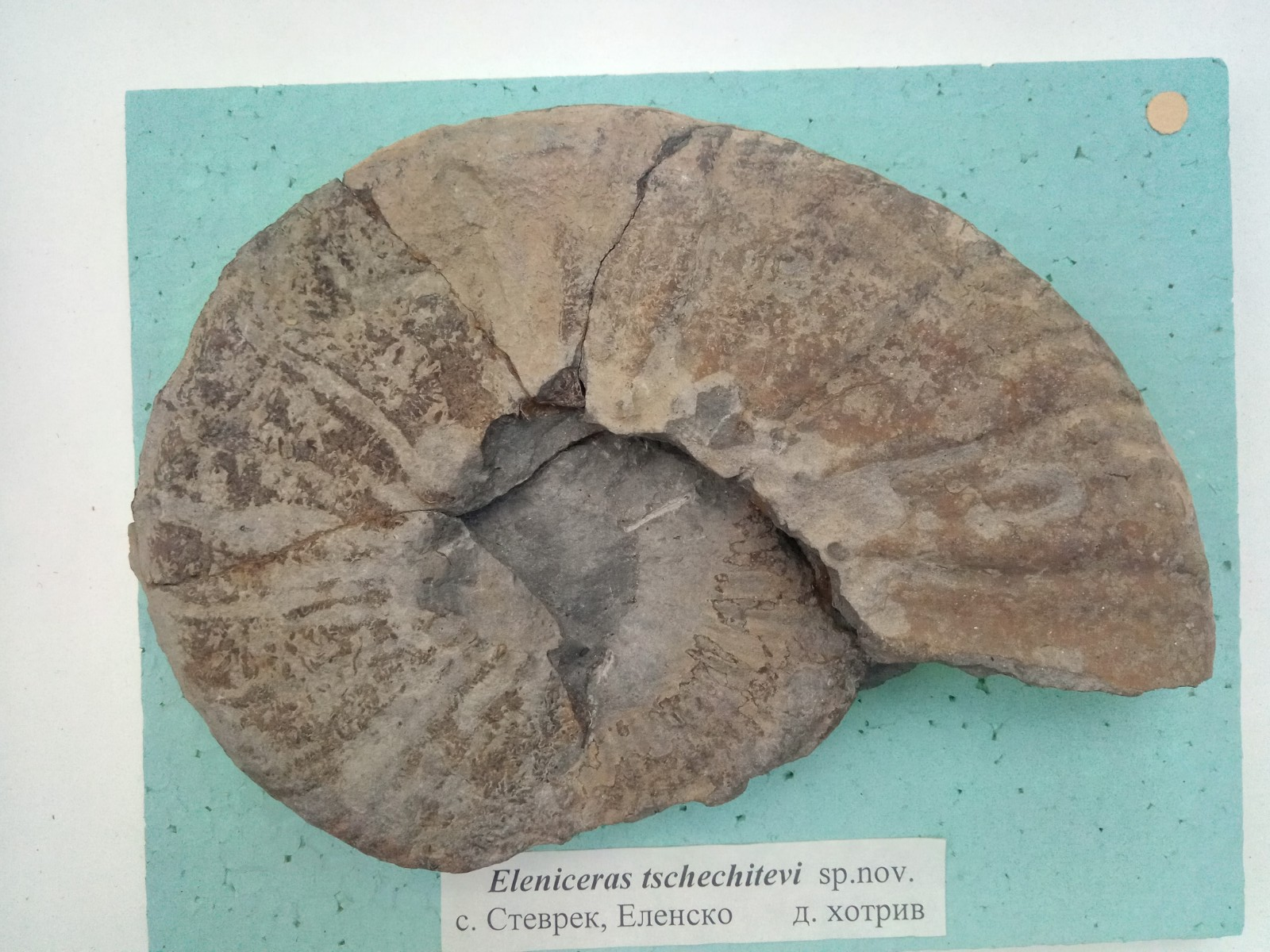
- Eleniceras tchechitevi, Lower Hauterivian, Stevrek, (Coll. St. Breskovski) at the Sofia University "St. Kliment Ohridski" Museum of Paleontology and Historical Geology

Scientific classification
- Kingdom: Animalia
- Phylum: Mollusca
- Class: Cephalopoda
- Subclass: †Ammonoidea
- Order: †Ammonitida
- Family: †Neocomitidae
- Genus: †Eleniceras
- Species: †E. tchechitevi

Binomial name
- †Eleniceras tchechitevi Breskovski, 1967

= Eleniceras tchechitevi =

Eleniceras tchechitevi Temporal range: Hauterivian Hauterivian

Species of molluscs (fossil)

Eleniceras tchechitevi is an extinct species of cephalopods belonging to the Ammonoidea subclass. This animal lived 140–129 million years ago during the Hauterivian in Europe.

== Etymology ==
The specific name, tchechitevi, is in honour of Georgi Tchechitev, who was a Bulgarian geologist and stratigrapher.
