= Elenski but =

- Alternative names: Elena pork leg
- Course: Cold cuts
- Place of origin: Bulgaria
- Region or state: Town of Elena
- Serving temperature: Cold
- Main ingredients: Ham

Elenski but (Bulgarian: еленски бут or (more precisely but less commonly), бут по еленски, sometimes translated as Elena round or Elena leg) is a dry-cured ham from the town of Elena, in northern Bulgaria, and a popular delicacy throughout the country. The meat has a specific taste and can be preserved in the course of several years, owing much to the special process of making and the climatic conditions of the part of Stara Planina where Elena is located.

== Preparation ==
The legs and quarters of the pig, traditionally singed and scraped, are taken from the body. Later the redundant parts are removed, so that the remaining meat is protected by hide or the skin that surrounds the muscle tissue. After the legs are shaped, they are well salted and put at the bottom of a postav, a special type of barrel designed for the occasion. The delicacy traditionally remains in salt for 40 days, then is taken out and left to dry.

=== Preservation technologies ===
There are various preservation technologies used to prepare elenski, but these typically vary considerably from family to family, as opposed to regionally. In the past, the rounds were put in well trampled upon maize meal or processed with lime milk. The meat could also be stored in specially sewn bags of cheesecloth or wooden containers with thick nets instead of walls (muharnik), but as a rule were placed somewhere airy, where the clear mountain air could aid the drying and conservation, and also in order to prevent houseflies laying eggs on the rounds.

In many of the small towns around Elena, the rounds were in the past left in conservation in the rooms where the daily house fire was lit, so that a certain amount of smoking could be achieved in order to add smoked flavour.

== See also ==
- Prosciutto and jamón serrano – similar delicacies
- Bulgarian cuisine
- List of hams
- List of dried foods
- List of smoked foods
