= Golyama reka =

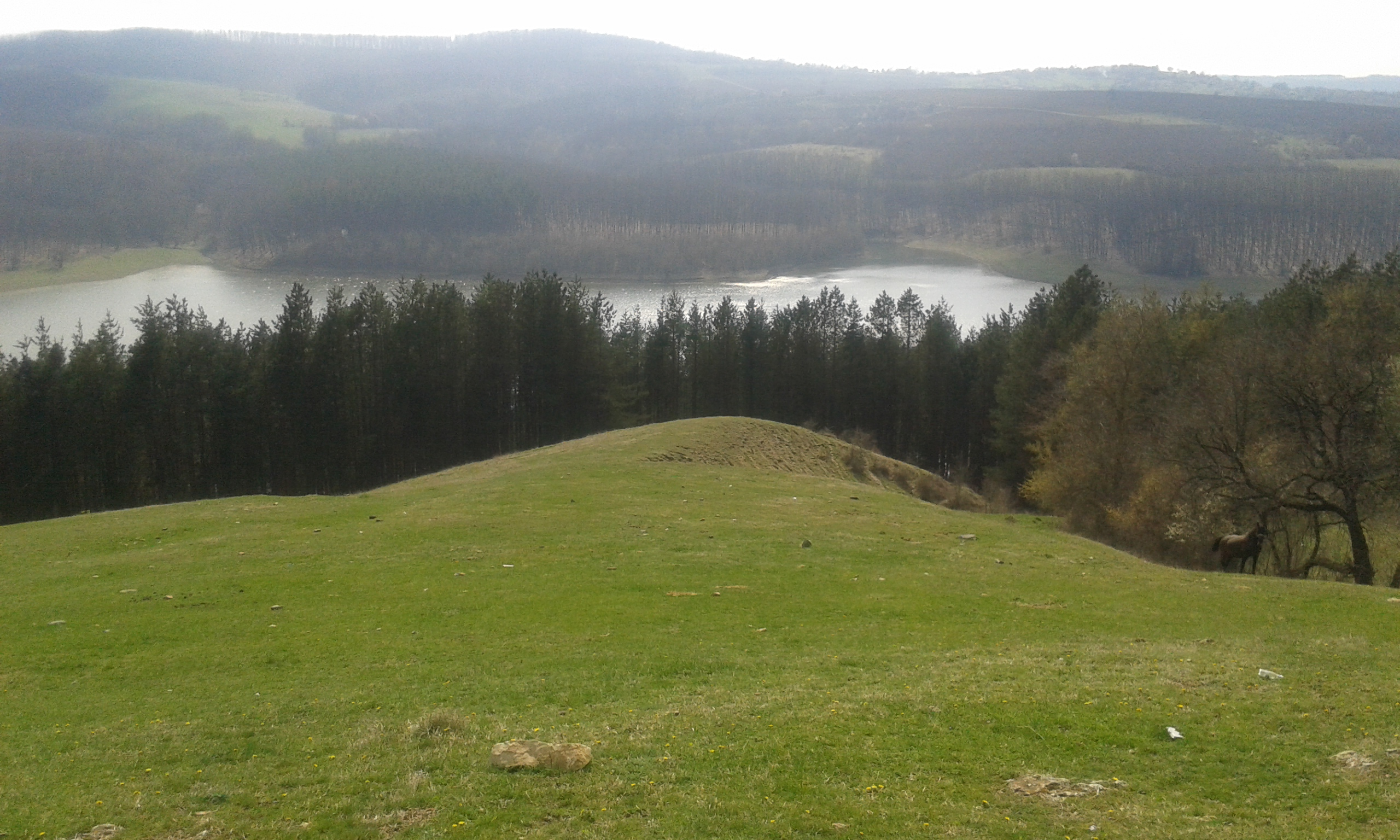
- The river at Yastrebino Reservoir

Location
- Country: Bulgaria

Physical characteristics
- Source
  - location: W of Gorsko Selo, Lisa Mountain
  - coordinates: 43°2′30.84″N 26°21′11.88″E
  - elevation: 654 m (2,146 ft)
- Mouth
  - location: Stara reka
  - coordinates: 43°10′9.84″N 25°56′8.88″E
  - elevation: 66 m (217 ft)
- Length: 75 km (47 mi)
- Basin size: 864 km^{2} (334 sq mi)

Basin features
- Progression: Stara reka→ Yantra→ Danube→ Black Sea

The Golyama reka (Bulgarian: Голяма река) is a 75 km-long river in northern Bulgaria, a right tributary of the Stara reka, itself a right tributary of the river Yantra of the Danube basin. It is the largest tributary of the Stara reka.

The Golyama reka takes its source at an altitude of 654 m, some 300 m west of the village of Gorsko Selo in the Lisa Mountain of the fore-Balkan. It flows north, then turns east and in 2 km enters the southern arm of the Yastrebino Reservoir, constructed along its course. Downstream of the reservoir's dam, the Golyama reka continues northwards, then near the village of Razdeltsi bends west and at Lyubentsi — northwest, flowing in a deep, densely forested and ravine-like valley throughout that section. At the village of Manastiritsa, the river turns west, and upstream of the town of Strazhitsa — southwest, and its valley widens. It flows into the Stara reka at an altitude of 66 m close to Kesarevo.

Its drainage basin covers a territory of 864 km^{2} or 35.5% of the Stara reka's total. High water is in March–June and low water is in July–October.

The river flows in Targovishte and Veliko Tarnovo Provinces. Significant sections of the river between the Yastrebino Reservoir and Manastiritsa serve as the border between Antonovo and Popovo Municipalities, and further downstream between the two provinces. Since the river flows in a deep valley, there are only three settlements along its course: the village of Gorsko Selo in Omurtag Municipality, and the village of Lyubentsi and the town of Strazhitsa in Strazhitsa Municipality, all of them in Targovishte Province. Its waters are utilized in the locally important Yastrebino Reservoir for irrigation and water supply.

Along the lower course of the Golyama reka, between Manastiritsa and Kesarevo, passes a section of the major railway line Sofia–Gorna Oryahovitsa–Varna served by the Bulgarian State Railways.
