= Zlataritsa Municipality =

Zlataritsa Municipality Община Златарица
- Municipality
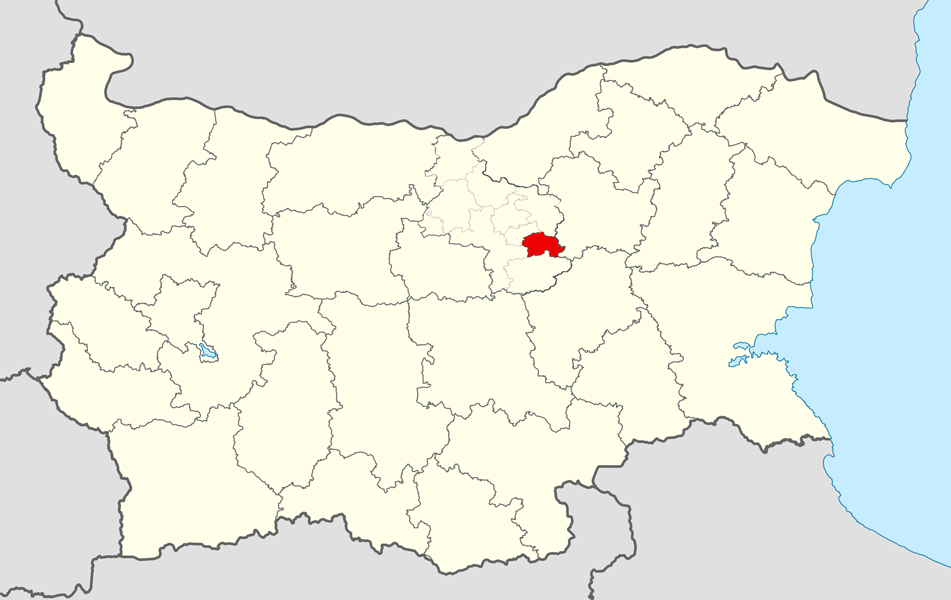
- Zlataritsa Municipality within Bulgaria and Veliko Tarnovo Province.
- Coordinates: 43°2′N 25°54′E
- Country: Bulgaria
- Province (Oblast): Veliko Tarnovo
- Admin. centre (Obshtinski tsentar): Zlataritsa

Area
  - Total: 232.67 km^{2} (89.83 sq mi)

Population (December 2009)
  - Total: 4,636
  - Density: 19.93/km^{2} (51.61/sq mi)
- Time zone: UTC+2 (EET)
  - Summer (DST): UTC+3 (EEST)

Zlataritsa Municipality (Bulgarian: Община Златарица) is a small municipality (obshtina) in Veliko Tarnovo Province, Central-North Bulgaria, located in the area of the so-called Fore-Balkan north of Stara planina mountain. It is named after its administrative centre - the town of Zlataritsa.

The municipality embraces a territory of 232.67 km^{2} (89.83 sq mi) with a population of 4,636 inhabitants, as of December 2009.

The highest point in the area is Kulata peak with 901 m (2,956 ft) above the sea level.

== Settlements ==
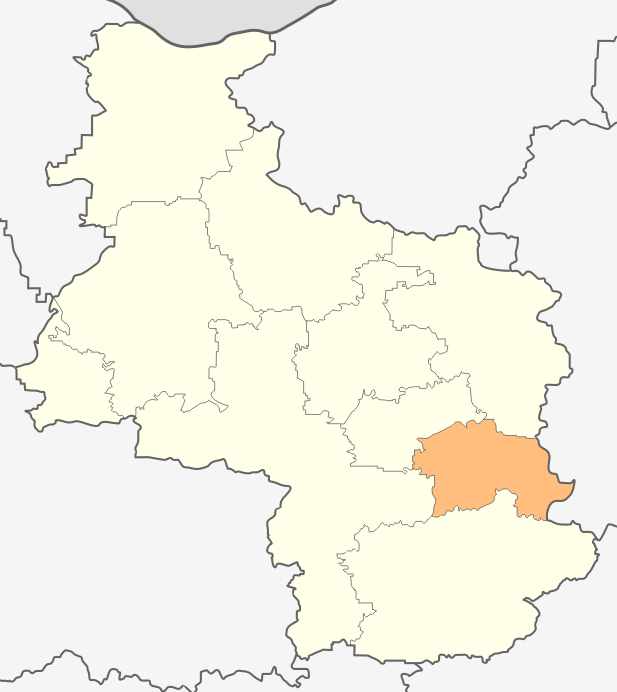
Zlataritsa Municipality within Veliko Tarnovo Province

Zlataritsa Municipality includes the following 24 places (towns are shown in bold):

Town/Village	Cyrillic	Population (December 2009)
**Zlataritsa**	**Златарица**	2,558
Cheshma	Чешма	10
Chistovo	Чистово	4
Dedina	Дедина	48
Dedintsi	Дединци	11
Delova Mahala	Делова махала	0
Dolno Shivachevo	Долно Шивачево	55
Dalgi Pripek	Дълги припек	61
Gorna Hadzhiyska	Горна Хаджийска	3
Gorsko Novo Selo	Горско Ново село	671
Kalaydzhii	Калайджии	132
Novogortsi	Новогорци	2
Ovoshtna	Овощна	1
Ravnovo	Равново	19
Razsoha	Разсоха	89
Rezach	Резач	103
Rodina	Родина	545
Rosno	Росно	126
Slivovitsa	Сливовица	117
Sredno Selo	Средно село	81
Total		4,636

== Demography ==
The following table shows the change of the population during the last four decades.

Zlataritsa Municipality
Year	1975	1985	1992	2001	2005	2007	2009	2011
Population	7,491	6,274	5,855	4,948	4,801	4,760	4,636	...
Sources: Census 2001, Census 2011, „pop-stat.mashke.org“,

=== Religion ===
According to the latest Bulgarian census of 2011, the religious composition, among those who answered the optional question on religious identification, was the following:

Religious composition of Zlataritsa Municipality
Orthodox Christianity	69.6%
Catholicism	0.3%
Protestantism	1.1%
Islam	16.0%
No religion	5.8%
Prefer not to answer, others and indefinable	7.2%

An overwhelming majority of the population of Zlataritsa Municipality identify themselves as Christians. At the 2011 census, 69.6% of respondents identified as Eastern Orthodox Christians belonging to the Bulgarian Orthodox Church. A large minority is Islamic.

== Sport ==
The sport base in Zlataritsa is old and depreciated. Zlataritsa has developed different sports teams during the years, ranging from football, table tennis, wrestling, handball, athletics and others. The town has a local football team with the name of FC Botev 1921, which continued playing until 2014 in the Local Football Group of Veliko Tarnovo. The stadium's name is 23 September. After 2014 the football club no longer plays due to the lack of funds and players.

== See also ==
- Provinces of Bulgaria
- Municipalities of Bulgaria
- List of cities and towns in Bulgaria
