= Ruhovtsi =

Ruhovtsi Руховци
- Location of Ruhovtsi
- Coordinates: 42.912°N 25.930°E
- Country: Bulgaria
- Provinces (Oblast): Veliko Tarnovo
- Elevation: 367 m (1,204 ft)

Population (December 2010)
  - Total: 142
- Time zone: UTC+2 (EET)
  - Summer (DST): UTC+3 (EEST)
- Postal Code: 5079
- Area code: 06151

Ruhovtsi (in Bulgarian: Руховци) is a village in northern Bulgaria, Elena municipality, Veliko Tarnovo Province.
