= Chistovo =

Chistovo Чистово
- Village
- Location within Ivanovo Oblast Location within Russia
- Coordinates: 56°49′N 39°27′E
- Country: Russia
- Region: Ivanovo Oblast
- District: Ilyinsky District
- Time zone: UTC+3:00

Chistovo (Russian: Чистово) is a rural locality (a village) in Ilyinsky District, Ivanovo Oblast, Russia. Population: 11 (2010 census);

== Geography ==
This rural locality is located 25 kilometres (16 mi) from Ilyinskoye-Khovanskoye (the district's administrative centre), 94 kilometres (58 mi) from Ivanovo (capital of Ivanovo Oblast) and 163 kilometres (101 mi) from Moscow. Tsensky is the nearest rural locality.
