= Zlataritsa =

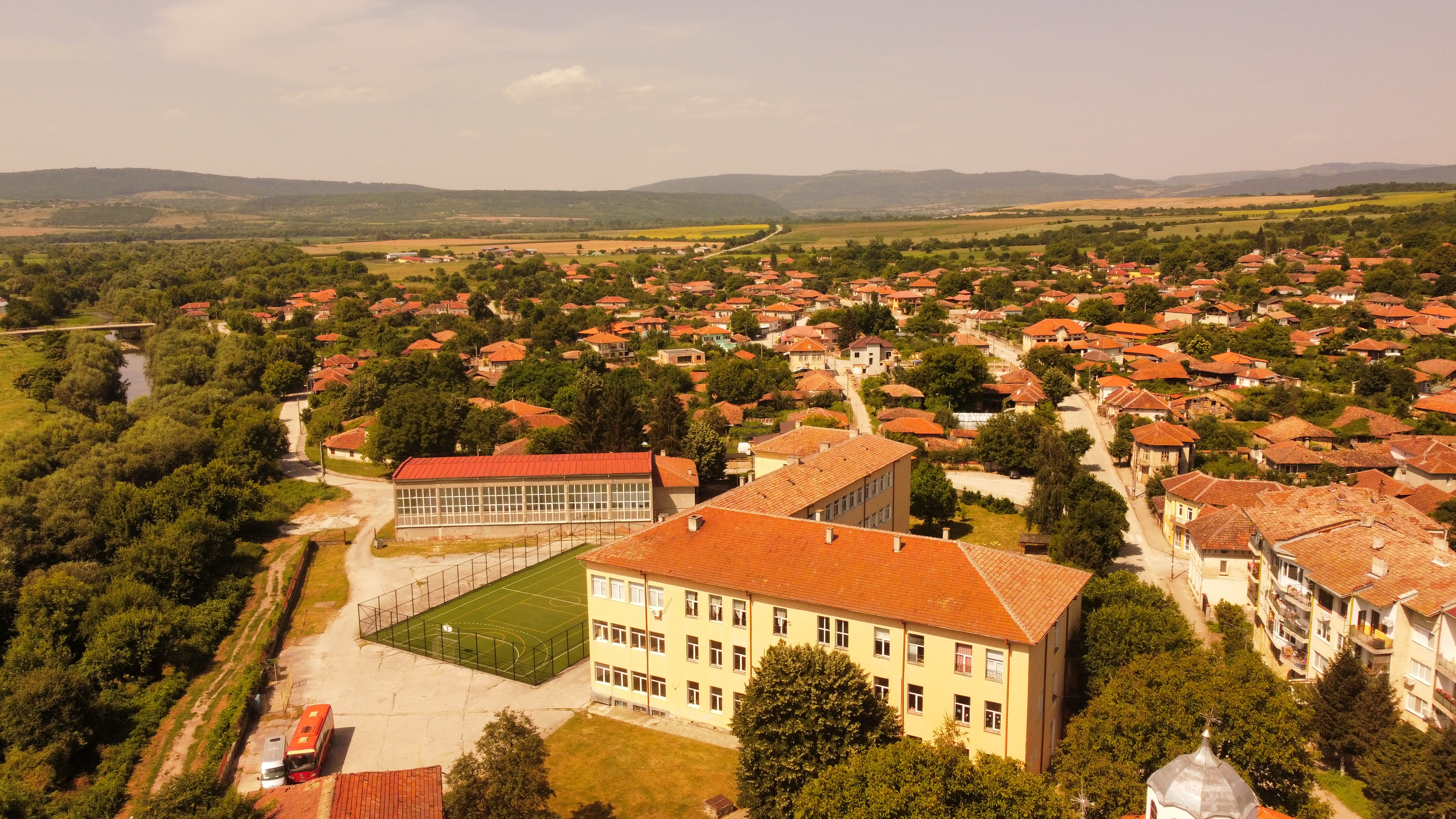

- Location of Zlataritsa
- Coordinates: 43°3′N 25°54′E
- Country: Bulgaria
- Provinces (Oblast): Veliko Tarnovo

Government
  - Mayor: Petar Ganev
- Elevation: 102 m (335 ft)

Population (2009-12-31)
  - Total: 2,558
- Time zone: UTC+2 (EET)
  - Summer (DST): UTC+3 (EEST)
- Postal code: 5090
- Area code: 06153

Zlataritsa (Bulgarian: Златарица [zɫɐˈtarit͡sɐ]) is a small town situated in the central northern part of Bulgaria, located in Veliko Tarnovo Province and close to the towns of Elena, Lyaskovets, Strazhitsa, and Antonovo, and to Rodina village, Veliko Tarnovo district. The city is the administrative center of the Zlataritsa Municipality. The climate of Zlataritsa is characteristic for its location north of the Balkan Mountains, which is typically continental. As of December 2009, the town has a population of 2,558 inhabitants.

Lunna Dolina (Moon Valley) is located in Ribartsi, within the Sredno Selo area of the Balkan Mountains. During the Second Bulgarian Empire when nearby Veliko Tarnovo was the capital of Bulgaria, Moon Valley may have been the summer residence of the ruling tsars. The local Church of St. Nicholas has recently been declared one of the Bulgarian Monuments of Culture. Three ancient settlements as well eight tombs from the 6th–7th millennium BC have been discovered in the vicinity, and fortress remains have been found in the Gradishte area of the municipality.

The Ancient Roman "Tsarigrad Road" passes to the south of the town. In the village of Gorsko Novo Selo a medieval church of 13th–14th century has been discovered, in addition to collections of coins reaching from the time from John Tzimiskes to Isaac II Angelos.

== History ==
During the period of Ottoman rule, the settlement functioned as an agricultural community. In the 19th century, it developed as a local center during the Bulgarian National Revival. Following the Liberation of Bulgaria in 1878, Zlataritsa was officially recognized as a town and became an administrative center.

Zlataritsa is lightly populated municipaly with potential for the development of ecotourism. The municipality is developing an eco-trail along river through sevelar natural areas. Its coordinates are 43°02′57.17″N 25°53′41.82″E

== Economy and demographics ==
Zlataritsa has experienced a population decline since the late 20th century. According to the final results of the 2021 Bulgarian census, the population of the town was 1,782, down from 2,558 in 2009. The local economy is primarily based on agriculture, including the cultivation of grains and livestock farming, alongside small-scale retail trade.

== Culture ==
The cultural life of the town is centered around the local chitalishte (community center). The Historical Museum of Zlataritsa preserves archaeological artifacts excavated from the municipality, as well as ethnographic exhibits detailing the traditional lifestyle of the region.

== Gallery ==
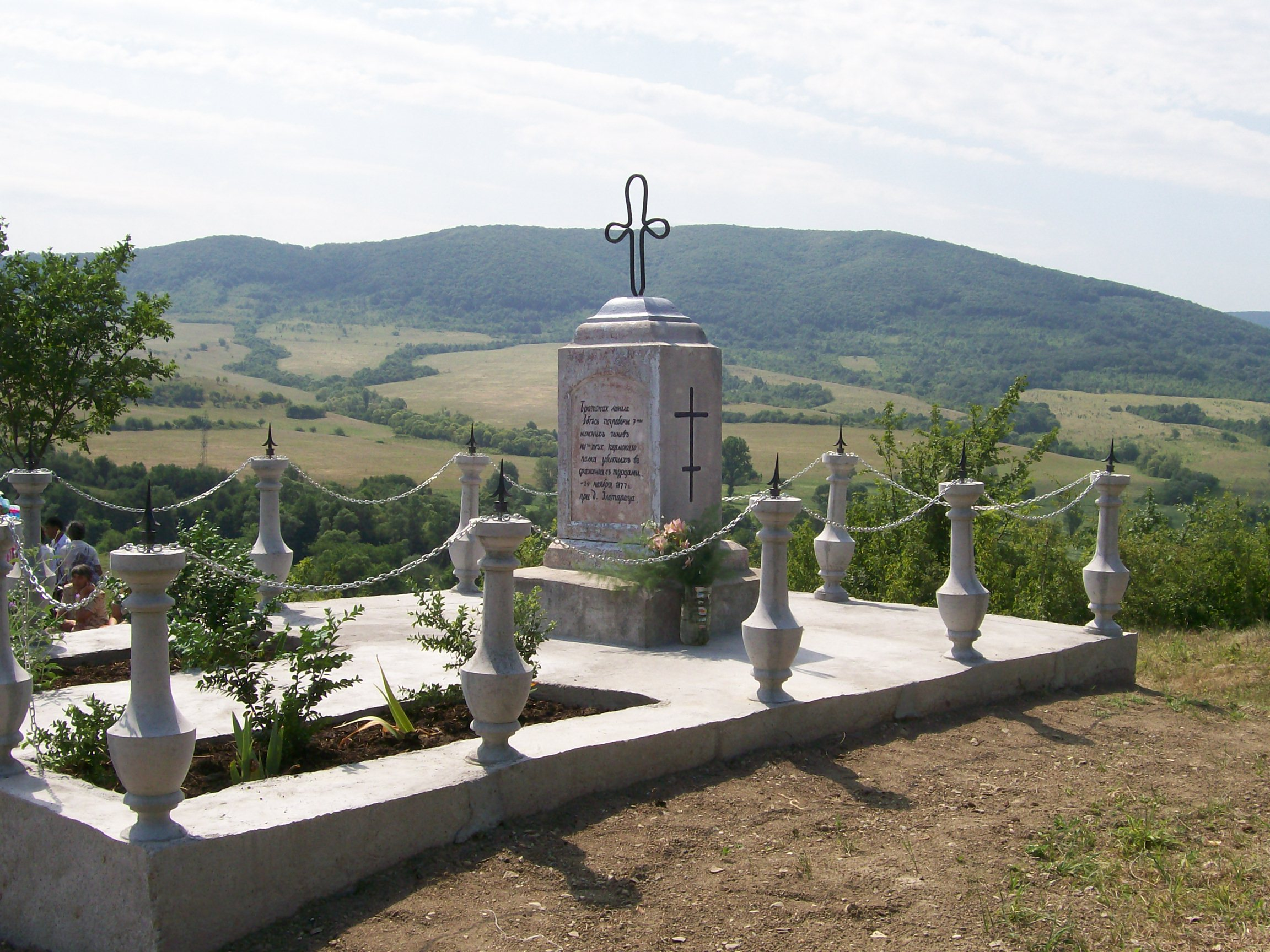
Mountain Memorial

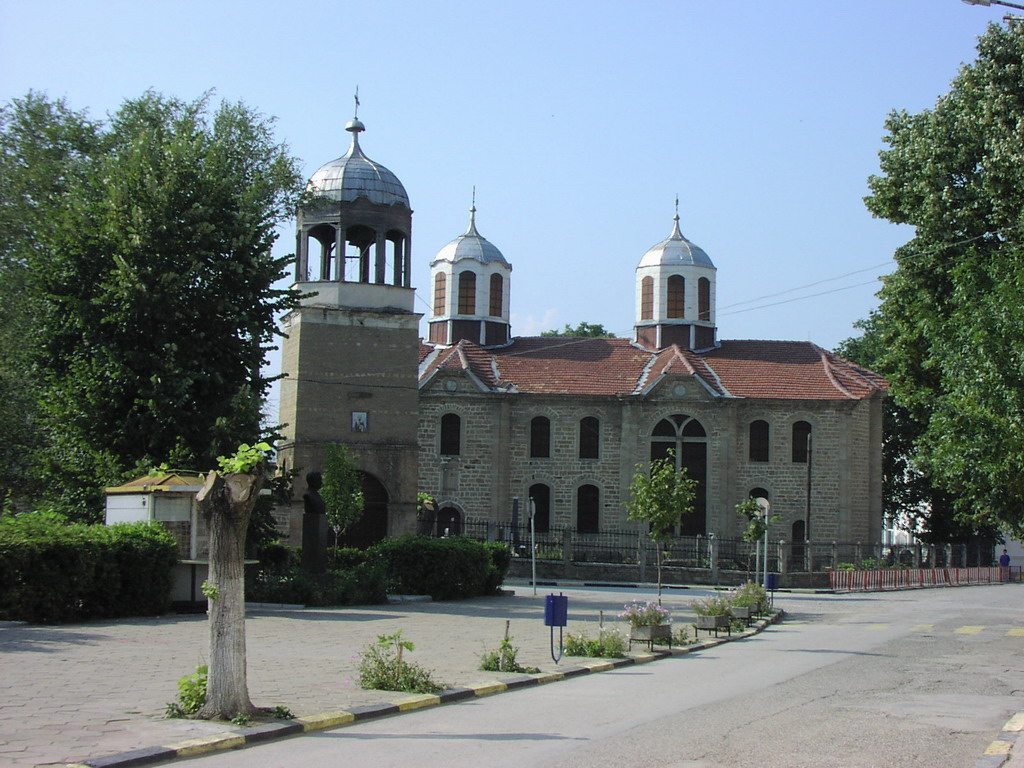
Church of St Nicholas

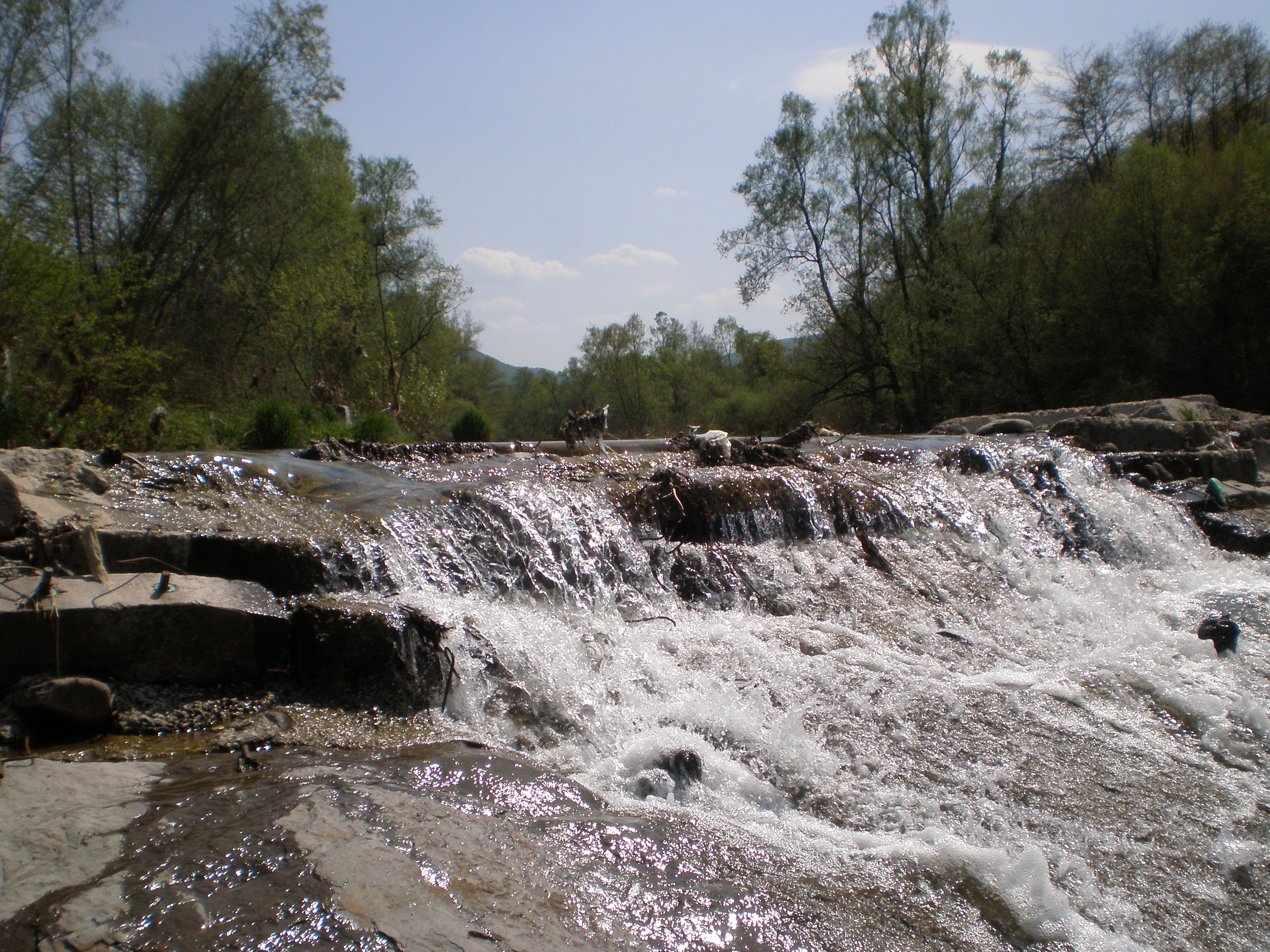
River Burzitsa

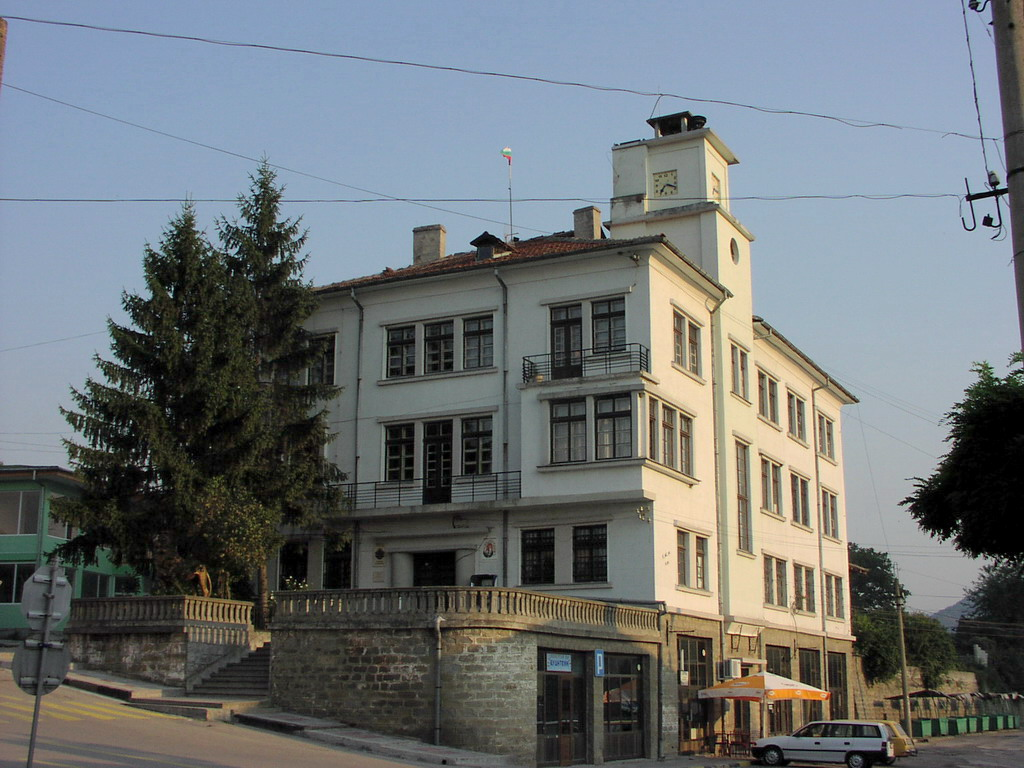
Municipal Hall

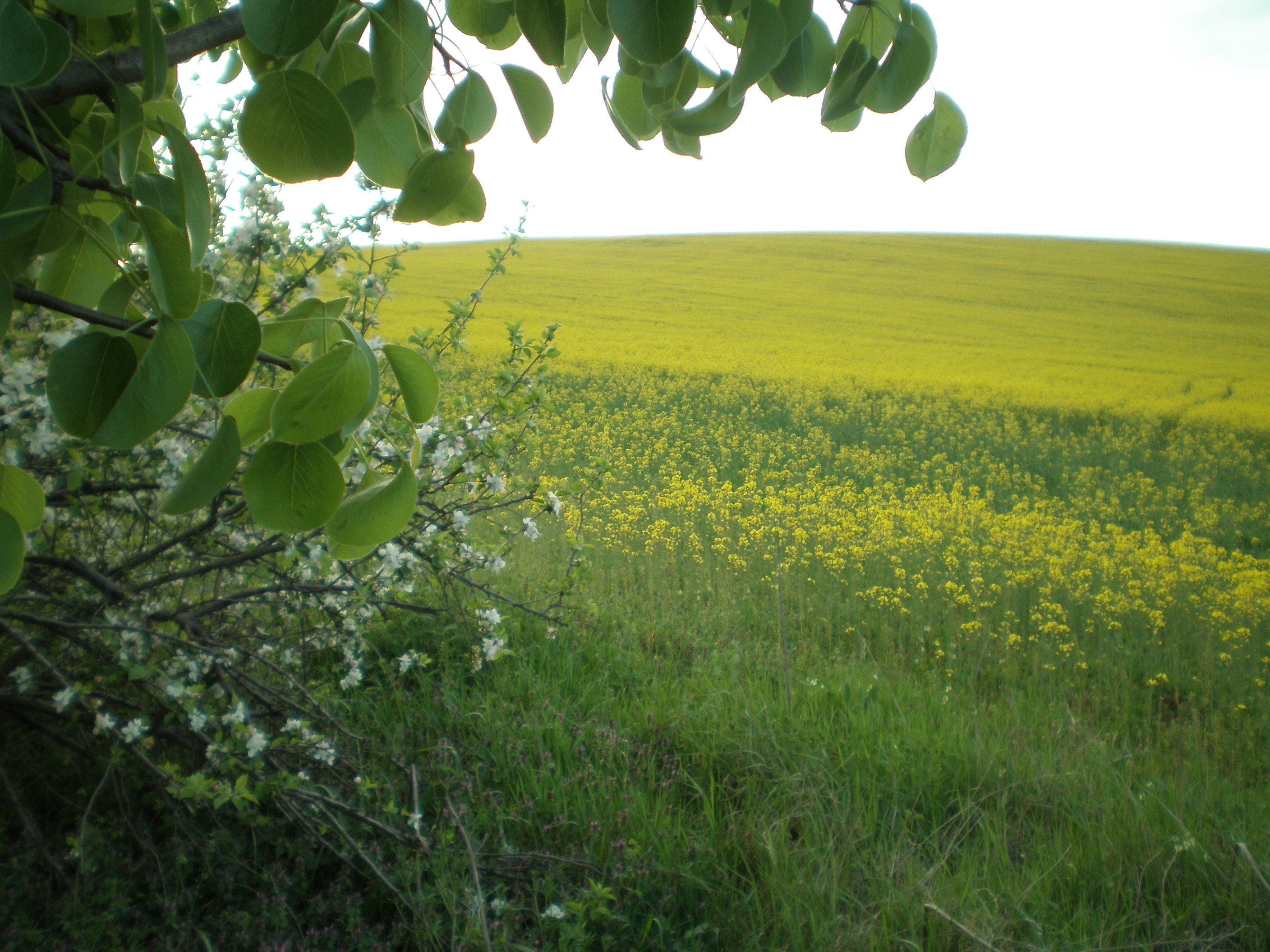
Meadow of yellow flowers leading into town

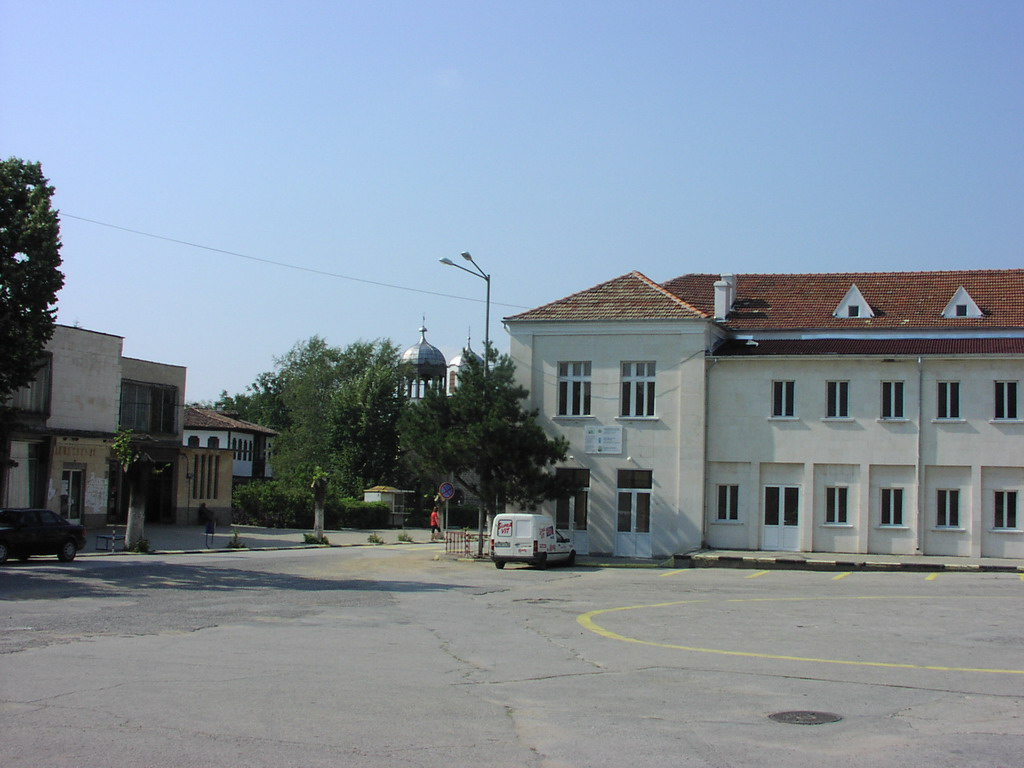
Cultural centre (chitalishte) and library

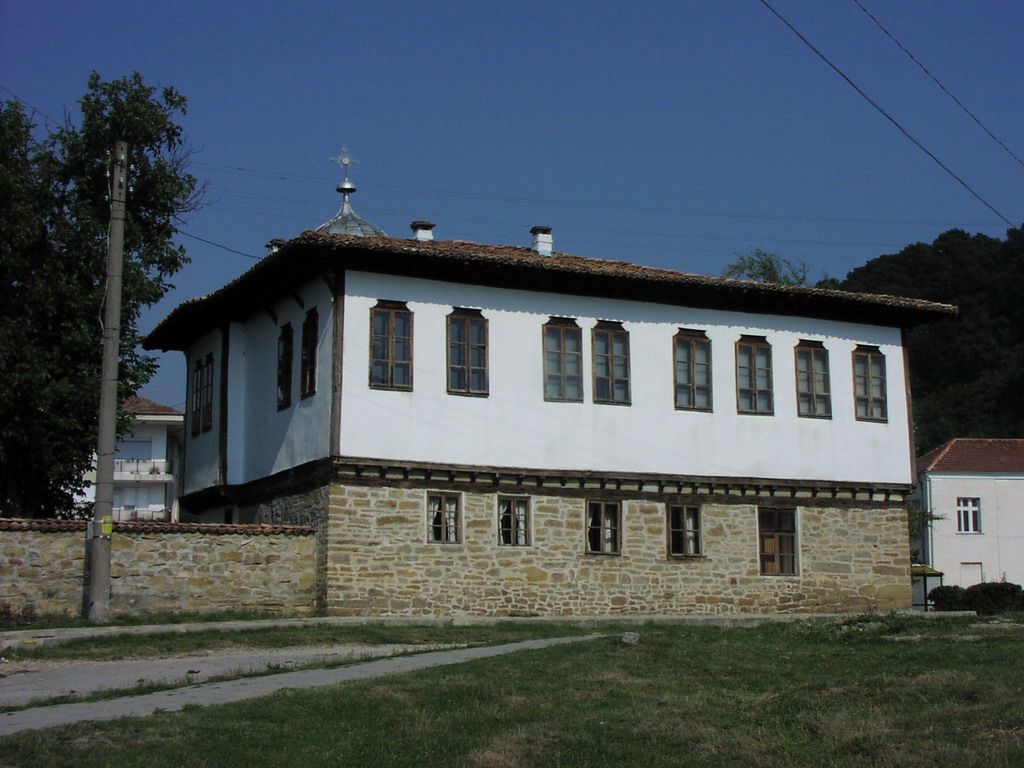
Historical Museum of Zlataritsa

== Twin town ==
- Taksony, Hungary, since (2025)
