= Stevrek =

Stevrek Стеврек
- Location of Stevrek
- Coordinates: 42.994°N 26.171°E
- Country: Bulgaria
- Provinces (Oblast): Targovishte
- Elevation: 347 m (1,138 ft)

Population (December 2010)
  - Total: 379
- Time zone: UTC+2 (EET)
  - Summer (DST): UTC+3 (EEST)
- Postal Code: 7960
- Area code: 06077

Stevrek (in Bulgarian: Стеврек) is a village in northern Bulgaria, Antonovo municipality, Targovishte Province. Until recently it was part of Elena Municipality, Veliko Tarnovo Province. There is a Roman bridge nearby.
