= Elena Municipality =

Elena Municipality Община Елена
- Municipality
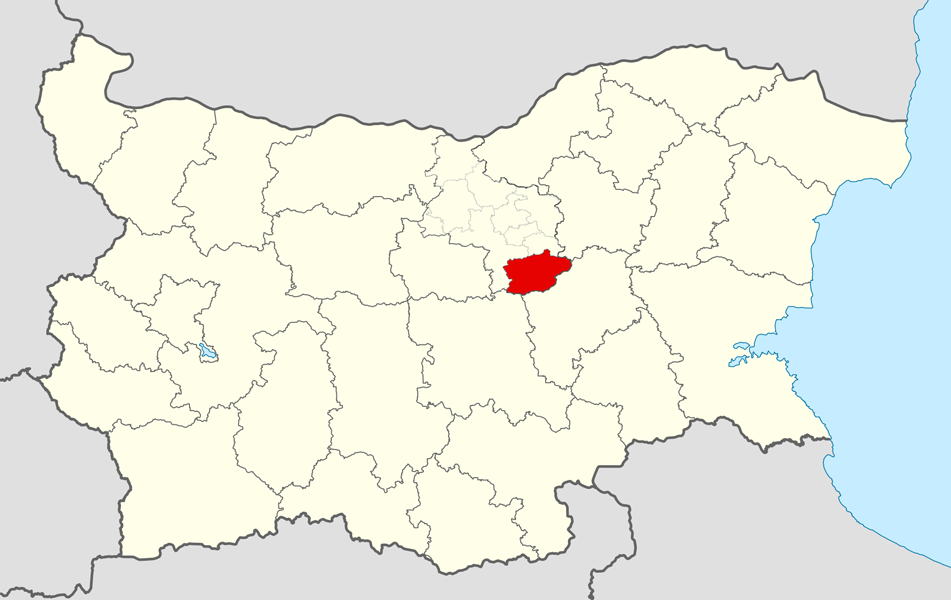
- Elena Municipality within Bulgaria and Veliko Tarnovo Province.
- Coordinates: 42°55′N 25°51′E
- Country: Bulgaria
- Province (Oblast): Veliko Tarnovo
- Admin. centre (Obshtinski tsentar): Elena

Area
  - Total: 671.39 km^{2} (259.23 sq mi)

Population (December 2009)
  - Total: 10,407
  - Density: 15.501/km^{2} (40.147/sq mi)
- Time zone: UTC+2 (EET)
  - Summer (DST): UTC+3 (EEST)

Elena Municipality (Bulgarian: Община Елена) is a municipality (obshtina) in Veliko Tarnovo Province, Central-North Bulgaria, located on the northern slopes of the central Stara planina mountain in the area of the so-called Fore-Balkan. It is named after its administrative centre, the town of Elena. It includes a territory of 671.39 km^{2} (259.23 sq mi) with a population of 10,407 inhabitants, as of December 2009.

The area is best known for its Bulgarian National Revival atmosphere preserved in its main town. Chumerna peak, 1,536 m (5,039 ft) above sea level, in the Elena-Tvarditsa range is the highest point in the province.

== Geography ==
Elena Municipality is situated in the Elena Balkan, 215 kilometres (134 mi) West of Varna, 38 km (24 mi) South of Veliko Tarnovo and 280 km (170 mi) East of Bulgaria's capital - Sofia. The city of Elena is situated in the valley of the Elena river. The rivers Veselina, Elena, Miykovska, and Bebrovska spring from the area.

=== Flora ===
The flora and fauna are varied, with the most common trees being beech, oak, maple, linden, and hornbeams. Other trees often found in the area are elm, ash, cherries, pear, and sorrel.

=== Fauna ===
There is a large diversity of animals living in the area. Widespread deer, Red deer, and wild boar are the most common, followed by predators like foxes, jackals and less often wolves. Smaller animals are also quite common - rabbits, partridge, snipe, and doves.

== Settlements ==
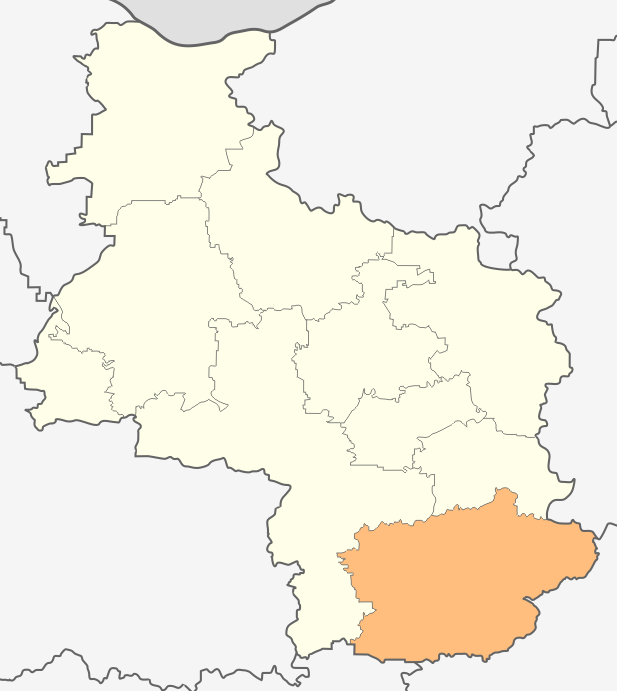
Elena Municipality within Veliko Tarnovo Province

(towns are shown in bold): Population (December 2009)

- **Elena** - **Елена** - 5,665
- Aplatsi - Аплаци -
- Bagalevtsi - Багалевци -
- Badevtsi - Бадевци -
- Baevtsi - Баевци -
- Bazhdari - Баждари -
- Balutsi - Балуци -
- Bebrovo - Беброво -
- Beykovtsi - Бейковци -
- Berkovtsi - Берковци -
- Blaskovtsi - Блъсковци -
- Bogdansko - Богданско -
- Boykovtsi - Бойковци -
- Bosevtsi - Босевци -
- Brezovo - Брезово -
- Brachkovtsii - Бръчковци -
- Buynovtsi - Буйновци -
- Byalkovtsi - Бялковци -
- Chavdartsi - Чавдарци -
- Chakali - Чакали -
- Chervenkovtsi - Червенковци -
- Cherni Dyal - Черни дял -
- Daveri - Давери -
- Daynovtsi - Дайновци -
- Debeli Rat - Дебели рът -
- Dobrevtsi - Добревци -
- Dolni Maryan - Долни Марян -
- Dolni Tanchevtsi - Долни Танчевци -
- Donkovtsi - Донковци -
- Draganovtsi - Драгановци -
- Dragiytsi - Драгийци -
- Dragnevtsi - Драгневци -
- Drenta - Дрента -
- Dukovtsi - Дуковци -
- Darlevtsi - Дърлевци -
- Gabarka - Габрака -
- Ganev Dol - Ганев дол -
- Glogovets - Глоговец -
- Golemani - Големани -
- Gorni Kray - Горни край -
- Gorni Tanchevtsi - Горни Танчевци -
- Gorska - Горска -
- Gramatitsi - Граматици -
- Gardevtsi - Гърдевци -
- Harvalovtsi - Харваловци -
- Hristovtsi - Христовци -
- Hanevtsi - Хъневци -
- Ivanivanovtsi - Иванивановци -
- Ignatovtsi - Игнатовци -
- Ilakov Rat - Илаков рът -
- Iliyuvtsi - Илиювци -
- Kamenari - Каменари -
- Kantari - Кантари -
- Karaivantsi - Караиванци -
- Karandili - Карандили -
- Kirevtsi - Киревци -
- Kozhlyuvtsi - Кожлювци -
- Kozya Reka - Козя река -
- Kolari - Колари -
- Konstantin - Константин -
- Kosevtsi - Косевци -
- Kostel - Костел -
- Kotutsi - Котуци -
- Krilyuvtsi - Крилювци -
- Krumchevtsi - Крумчевци -
- Lazartsi - Лазарци -
- Lesiche - Лесиче -
- Maysko - Майско -
- Marafeltsi - Марафелци -
- Marinovtsi - Мариновци -
- Maryan - Марян -
- Mahalnitsi - Махалници -
- Miykovtsi - Мийковци -
- Minevtsi - Миневци -
- Mirchovtsi - Мирчовци -
- Ruhovtsi - Руховци -

== Demography ==
The following table shows the change of the population during the last four decades.

Elena Municipality
Year	1975	1985	1992	2001	2005	2007	2009	2011
Population	16,546	14,684	13,581	11,342	10,843	10,621	10,407	...
Sources: Census 2001, Census 2011, „pop-stat.mashke.org“,

=== Religion ===
According to the latest Bulgarian census of 2011, the religious composition, among those who answered the optional question on religious identification, was the following:

Religious composition of Elena Municipality
Orthodox Christianity	70.2%
Catholicism	0.2%
Protestantism	0.5%
Islam	17.3%
No religion	2.7%
Prefer not to answer, others and indefinable	9.3%

== See also ==
- Provinces of Bulgaria
- Municipalities of Bulgaria
- List of cities and towns in Bulgaria
