= Elena (town) =

Elena Елена
- Town
- Location of Elena, Bulgaria
- Coordinates: 42°56′N 25°53′E
- Country: Bulgaria
- Provinces (Oblast): Veliko Tarnovo

Government
  - Mayor: Sasho Topalov
- Elevation: 293 m (961 ft)

Population (2009-12-31)
  - Total: 5,665
- Time zone: UTC+2 (EET)
  - Summer (DST): UTC+3 (EEST)
- Postal Code: 5070
- Area code: 06151
- Website: www.elena.bg

Elena (Bulgarian: Елена [ɛˈlɛnɐ]) is a Bulgarian town in the central Stara Planina mountain in Veliko Tarnovo Province, located 42 km (26 miles) southeast of Veliko Tarnovo. It is the administrative centre of the homonymous Elena Municipality. The area is also a mountain resort, known for the typical local cuisine. As of December 2009, the town had a population of 5,665. It forms a terminal for the Gorna Oryahovitsa-Elena railway line.

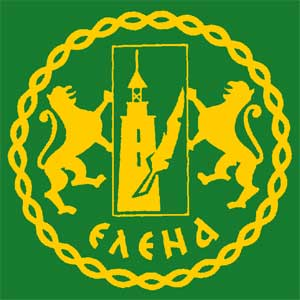
Symbol of Elena

== History and architecture ==
Elena is an old settlement founded before the 15th century. During the 18th and 19th century it established itself as a centre for crafts, trade and education. There are several architectural ensembles preserved dating back to the Bulgarian National Revival and comprising about 130 old houses. There are also wall-to-wall construction forms and interesting street silhouettes. The houses have stone basements with white-washed or wooden walls of the upper floor with protruding bays above.

The town's sights include an old first class school, founded in 1848 and named Daskalolivnitsa, where future teachers were educated (and where nowadays a museum exhibition is arranged). The St Nicholas Church of the 16th century, with valuable mural paintings and icons, and the three-naved Church of the Assumption, built entirely of stone (1837). The clock tower (Chasovnikova kula) that features an antique clock mechanism (1812) rises at the town's highest point.

== Legend about Elena's founding ==
There are many legends about the establishment of the town of Elena, the most common is about two lovers. The legend says that in the virgin forests of the Balkan Mountains was a pathway. A happy newly married couple was passing through this way. The bride was called Elena – from the village of Kapinovo, and the groom was Samuil from Tvarditsa. Bandits attacked the wedding ceremony at the place where the town of Elena is situated today. Elena fought with the abductors and they killed her near the Bridge of the Turkish Police office. She was interred in a grave in the area called "The Cross" that was later made into a churchyard. Samuil was beheaded at the end of the present town now known as Samuilets. Because of the sorrow towards their son, Samuil's parents settled down in this region and established the village that was named after Elena.

== Geography ==
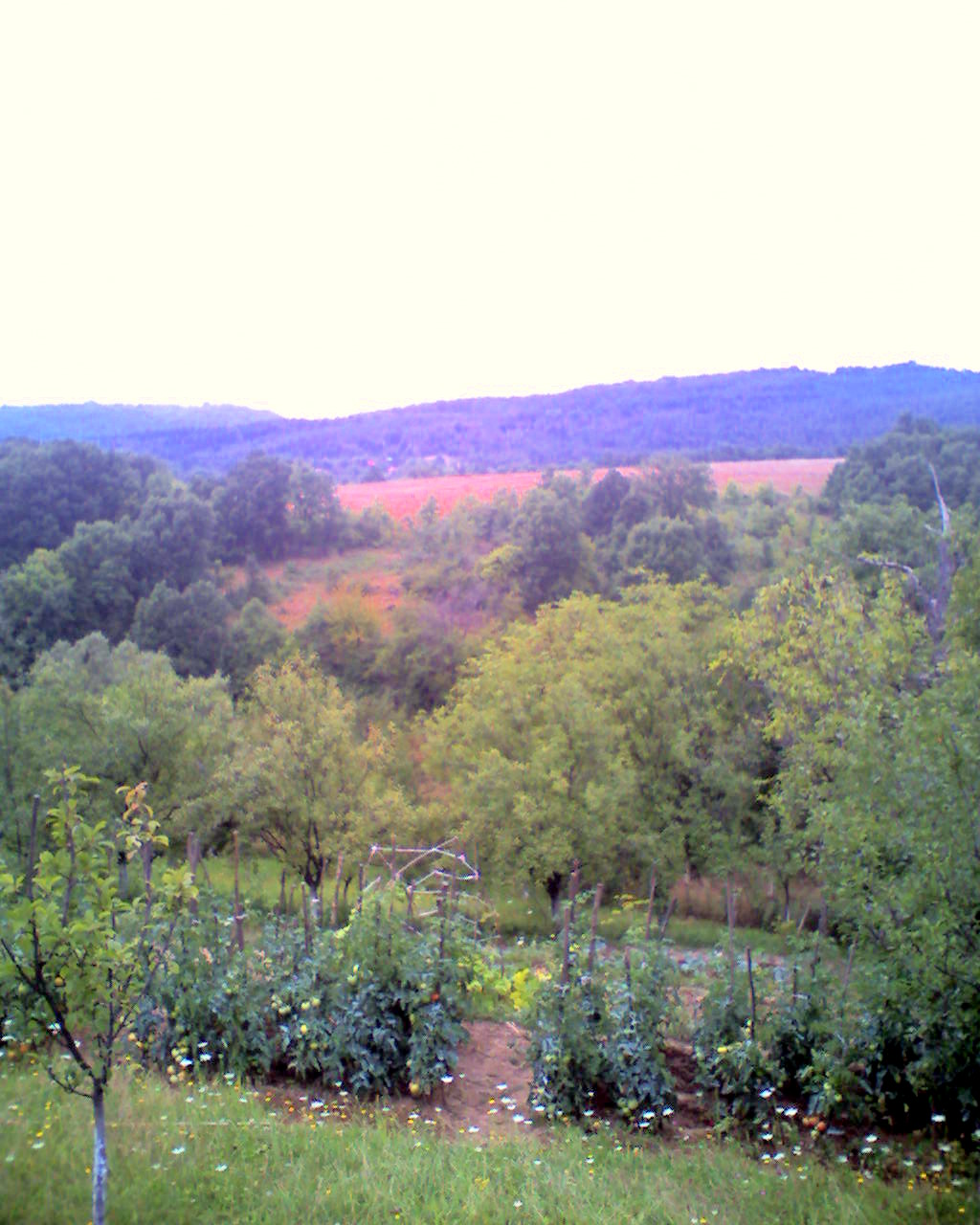
Landscape in the central Balkan mountains, Elena, Bulgaria

The town of Elena is situated in the skirts of the woody Elena Balkan range, in the valley of Elena river. On the north are situated Elena’s Hills, and on the south is the Balkan range. On the north of the town is Chukani Hill, where – amongst the pine trees, is situated the building of the former Climate Health School. Beyond the Hill there are a few outcropping of limestone, malm, and sandstone. The town is situated 38 km (24 miles) on the south of Veliko Tarnovo, 230 km (150 miles) away from Varna, and 280 km (170 miles) away from Sofia.

=== Former villages merged with Elena ===
- Boevtsi
- Gorni Tchukani
- Dolni Genovtsi
- Kazatsi
- Kilazhovtsi
- Lapavishkovtsi – a hamlet near Elena till 1892. Later on it was counted as part of the hamlets Razpopovtsi and Neyovtsi. It was joined to Elena according to the State decree 757 in 1971
- Maytanyatsi
- Milkovtsi
- Mladenovtsi
- Neyuvtsi
- Novachkini – it was erased from the Register of the Bulgarian Settlements in 1971 according to a state decree, it was joined to the town of Elena as a residential district
- Partchovtsi
- Pazpopovtsi
- Sindzhirtsi
- Tinkovo
- Usoi – a hamlet near the town of Elena; it was erased from the Register of the Bulgarian Settlements in 1971 according to a state decree; it was joined to the town of Elena as a residential district

== History ==
Since 1430, the town has been known as Stramena and Eliana. It used to be a craft, trade and culture centre in 18th and 19th century. The town itself and its citizens both had roles in the Bulgarian Revival. The people of Elena had taken part in several important events from that moment on – for example, Velcho's Conspiracy (in 1835) and Tarnovo rebellion in 1862.

The town of Elena is known as the “Bulgarian Bethlehem” because there were three churches in the town during the Revival. At that time this was something unseen in any other town.

The most sacred place in Elena is the old church “Saint Nikola”. There is data about its existence even before the 16th century. In the old psalter – saved by Doino Gramatik, it is mentioned that “This book is being given to the church “St. Nikola” in 1518 by a Pera”. The church already was a book store-house as well in those ages – a bridge between Elena and the Tarnovo Literary School. It is said that this church had many ancient parchment hand-written books. They were maintained by a special priest who had lent them out to others. The temple “St. Nikola” was the only one for all the villages around Elena. The villagers used to conduct their religious rituals in the local little village churchyards. They prayed for rain and rich harvests under century-old oak-trees. They organised liturgies in the days of their saints – St. Archangel, St. Nikola, and St. Ilia. The oldest man burned incense over the common table with incense on a broken roof-tile instead of an incense-burner. The villagers came to Elena to the church “St. Nikola” on Sundays. The church days became market days as well. Thus, later on, they started organising fairs that lasted three days and took place three times a year.

On April 23, 1800 – the day of St. Georgi, when Elena was attacked by Muslim tribes (kardzhalii), the church “St. Nikola” was burned down together with most of the books. Without the permission of the Turkish authorities, the people of Elena started restoring the church. They rebuilt the church in secret for 40 days and nights. They had to dig the church into the ground in order not to tease the enslavers. It was restored back to the way it looked, in 1804, with the funds donated by the rich people and the labour of the poor.

The rebuilding was managed by Hadji Ivan Kisiov – grandson of Pope Petko Sheytana, who attended the Sultan’s mother in Tzarigrad in a hat with a wheat-ear and persuaded her that the people of Elena should be relieved of their obligation to pay tax on growing of their wheat. Having heard that the trade governor of the region would order an examination whether the people of Elena were building a church illegally, Hadji Ivan Kisiov had the outer walls of the church grouted with lime and charcoal solution one night. Thus the walls looked old and smoke-black. Hadji Ivan kindly welcomed the examiners, gave them 30 golden coins, showed them the building and told them: “Greet the governor for me and tell him that the people of Elena don’t build a church but reconstruct an old threshing-floor”.

The church looks like a stronghold from outside. Its walls are made of stone and are 1-meter thick; the little windows have iron gratings, and the altar is like an embrasure. The door was made of thick oak boards studded with iron, with a unique heavy lock mechanism. It is roofed in with heavy stone slates. The church was consecrated on the Annunciation – March 25, 1805. A stone plate built in on the left of the altar says that the church was rebuilt from its foundations after it was burned down by agrarian bandits. The biggest loss was that of the burned historic parchment manuscripts from the literary treasury.

Pope Doino Gramatik had mentioned the names of 12 church-donors, one of whom was Stoyan Mihaylovski – the father of Ilarion Makareopolski. Today, there is a collection of 340 old books in the book store-house.

The church “St. Nikola” was decorated completely by the famous Elena icon-painters of those ages – David and Yyakov who were born in Bolertsi. They finished their work in 1817–1818. The wall paintings are considered to be cultural monuments of national importance. Here are the icon of the saints Metodiy of Morav, Georgi Novi of Sofia, Sava of Serbia, and the icon of Kliment of Ohrid – whose icon is a very rare one both in Bulgaria and Macedonia, and that is why it is one of high artistic value. The wooden iconostasis and the bishop's stall are also considered highly valued.

A new chapel "The Assu of Holy Virgin" was built in 1800 with the permission of Rousse-Tarnovo governor Smail Aga. This chapel was remade into a steadier building in 1813. As the time passed, the wooden building ceased satisfying the needs of the town. The people of Elena decided to build a bigger church. They thought of demolishing the fortified wall “Kaleto” and using its stone materials. They decided to do so in order to prevent the fortress being settled by Turkish garrisons. The building of this church was the work of master Miho from Bolertsi – a hamlet near Elena. The whole building with its solid construction and the materials, the artistic execution of the details and especially the interior showed the increased self-confidence of the citizens, and the constructive mastery and courage of master Miho. He was a contemporary of Kolio Fitcheto, master Gencho Kanev, and he did not step back to their creativity, design and realisation. The construction was started in 1836, and finished in 1837, and the church was consecrated on August, 28.

In 1861 when the church was repaired, a notice stating this was left on the western wall above the cornice. The bell tower is a separate building which was built in 1912. In 1925 the church “The Assu of Holy Virgin” lost an incredibly precious artistic creation – in a fire the iconostasis was burned down. The new iconostasis was carved by Gorgi Kirov, and the icons were created by the artist Hristo Berberov from Elena.

The third relic – the temple “The Birth of Holy Virgin” has had a fortune similar to that of the old church “St. Nikola” and has been bounded with the historical development of the town. In 1812 a chapel was built under the direction of Hadji Yordan Bradata on a site given as a present by Hadji Panayot and Hadji Dimitar Razsukanov. It was reported in Tarnovo that a church was built again in secret and without the sultan’s decree. Hadji Yordan Bradata disguised the building before the examination (as Hadji Ivan Kisiov did few years ago); he ordered cribs to be put and horses to be tied up in the temple in order to make it look like stables. The temple together with the near-built cells were primary used as a convent for young girls. A legend says that Hadji Yordan Bradata’s wife, after his hanging, entered this same convent as a nun. Conspirators from the Velcho’s Conspiracy swore at the icon of Hadji Yordan Bradata (that was brought from the Holy Sepulchre) in the temple of Plakovci monastery “St. Ilia”. On July 20, 1859 the wooden walls of the chapel “The Birth of Holy Virgin” could not survive the fair that flamed out. They started the building of a new church and finished it in 1865. It was built by the young master Kolio Petkov from Tyavna – a student of Kolio Fitcheto. During the next year in the two newly built rooms next to the chapel, a school for young girls was established. The school functioned till 1894.

On November 22, 1877 in one of the bloody battles from the Russian-Turkish war, the Battle of Elena, when the town was set on fire, the enslavers destroyed the iconostasis and made a corn-store out of the church.

The icon called “The Bulgarian Teachers” portraying the saints equal to Apostles and Slavic-Bulgarian Teachers Cyril and Methodius was a precious relic from the church. It was painted by Stanislav Dospevski at the people of Elena’s request in 1866. The icon stayed in the church for 15 years and afterwards was given as a present to the public school and now it is being preserved in the cultural-historic complex “Daskalolivnitsata” (meaning “the place that “produces” teachers”). The icon has deep symbolic content. The saint brothers are having the Sacrament cup in their hands and with the gospel call they say: “The power is in the speech”. This is the Sacrament for the Bulgarian people. Above the saint brothers’ heads is shining the sun shining with ten rays – symbolising science.

In 1966 the temple was constructively strengthened. During the restoration of the wall-paintings of the church above the north door was found an in-built stone slide with a beautiful embossed icon of the church’s patron saint – Saint Nikola. In the autumn of 1987 the church was completely restored and exposed to visits.

== Cultural and natural sights ==
147 cultural monuments were preserved, 7 out of them are of national importance:

- The native house of Ilarion Makareopolski
- The clock tower
- The cultural and historic complex “Daskalolivnitsata”
- The church “Saint Nikola”
- The church “The Assu of Holy Virgin” with its bell tower
- The five houses of Razsukanovs
- The house of Pope Nikola

The town of Elena possesses more than 6 000 ethnographic objects of material cultural heritage, 780 works of Revival and Modern art, and many ancient books.

== Museums ==
- Daskalolivnitsata – the first Bulgarian class school, established by Ivan Momchilov in 1843
- The house-museum “Ilarion Makariopolski”, situated on 2, Doino Gramatik Street
- Paleontology Museum
- The house of Yordan Hadjipetkov – the father of Petko Todorov and Mina Todorova

You can find more information about this on the web site of The Museum of the Revival in Elena (www.museum.elena.bg).

== Kaleto ==
It is situated on a hill above Elena. In the ages of kardzhalii there was a huge stone stronghold. In its highest part there was a guard who kept a sharp eye on potential approaching of kirdzhalis. If he had noticed them coming, he would have given an alarm, and all the churches had started ringing their church-bells. This served as a signal for the people of Elena to head for Kaleto as fast as possible in order to find protection against the bandits. After the kardzhalii’s crime activities were over, the fortress Kaleto was used as Turkish Army barracks, but it started demolishing. In 1836, when the church “The Assu of Holy Virgin” was built, there were used materials from the demolished stronghold Kaleto to build the church.

== Natural sights ==
There are a few natural sights near Elena:

- The Stone of Marko – a huge stone that was said to be thrown there by the strong King Marko
- Raev Stone
- The Elephant Tree – a huge oak tree that is 1300 years old, it has one low and thick branch which looks like proboscis
- The waterfall of Hristivtsi
- The peak of Chumerna
- The peak of Ostrets – an extinct volcano
- The peak of Simanovo

== Holidays and feasts ==
- On May, 1st a traditional feast takes place on the central meadow of the village Neiovtsi; it is famous for the rich concert program and public fun
- Before the official holiday of the town of Elena the beauty contest “The Queen of Elena” takes place, the victress becomes an important participant in the town festivities
- On May, 21st they celebrate the town holiday – the day of “St. Konstantin and St. Elena”. The holiday is being celebrated every year with many festivities, concerts, contests and so on. On the same date the alumni of the high school of Elena “Ivan Momchilov” graduate the school.
- Around May, 24th – Municipal fair of the national community centers – it is an official closing of the creative season of the amateur collectives from different community centers
- Elena Balkan Feast – it takes place in July and it lasts for two days. The second day is the feast day of the amateur collectives of the pensioners, called “On the south and on the north of the Balkan”.
- The first celebration of the feast “The Balkan sings and tells” was organized in Elena on the central meadow of the village Neiovtsi on June 20 21st 1974, ever since this year it is being organized on a rotary principle in the Balkan towns Elena, Dryanovo, Kotel, Tyavna, Tvarditsa and Gurkovo.
- December, 5th – the people of Elena honour the people who were killed by the village of Maryan. The monument on the west end of the town dedicated to those dead people is called “The Escape” and is being associated with the escape of the people of Elena when the town was attacked.

== Public institutions ==
- The Public administration of the Municipality of Elena
- Municipality council
- The Museum of the Revival
- Paleontology Museum
- Cultural center “Napredak” – Elena
- The high school “Ivan Momchilov”
- Municipal children’s complex
- “Civil society” Association – Elena
- i-Centre – Elena

== Personalities ==
- Born in Elena:
  - Alexander Pindikov (born in 1930), cultural figure
  - Andrey Robovski
  - Georgi Georgiev-Getz (01.10.1926 – 02.09.1996), actor
  - Dimitar Mollov (1846 – 1914), politician
  - Doyno Gramatik, educationalist
  - Ivan Momchilov (1819 – 1869), educationalist
  - Ilarion Makariopolski
  - Yosif Bradati (1682 – 1759)
  - Konstantin Nikiforov
  - Milan Radivoev (1845 – 1918), educationalist
  - Nikola Mihaylovski (1818–1892), educationalist
  - Petko Gorbanov, educationalist, politician
  - Petko Todorov (1879 – 1916), writer
  - Petar Zlatev (1883 – 1948), army officer
  - Stefan Bobchev (1853 – 1940), jurist and publicist
  - Stoyan Mihaylovski (1856 – 1927), writer
  - Teodor Teodorov (1859 – 1924), politician
  - Hadji Sergiy, bookman and revolutionary
  - Yordan Milanov, (1867 – 1932) architect
  - Yordan Nenov, educationalist
  - Sava Katrafilov (? – 1876), revolutionary
- Other personalities connected to Elena:
  - Sava Katrafilov (? – 1876), revolutionary, he graduated Elena’s class school in the 1850s
  - Petko Rachev Slaveykov (17.09.1827 – 01.07.1895), Bulgarian poet, publicist, social figure and folklore researcher, he had given the name of Elena class school – “Daskalolivnitsata”
  - Emilian Stanev (28.02.1907 – 15.03.1979), Bulgarian writer and publicist

== Gallery ==
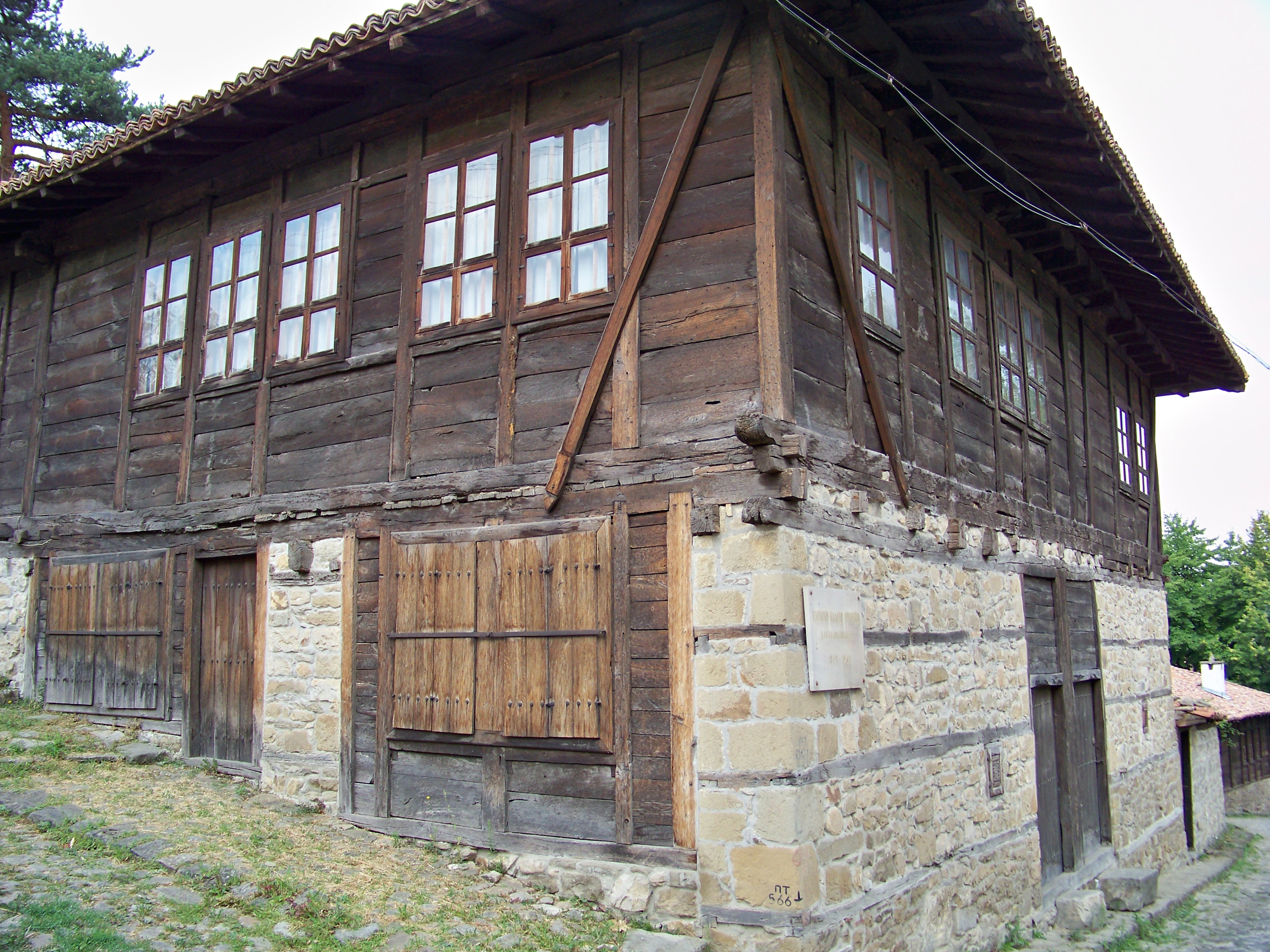

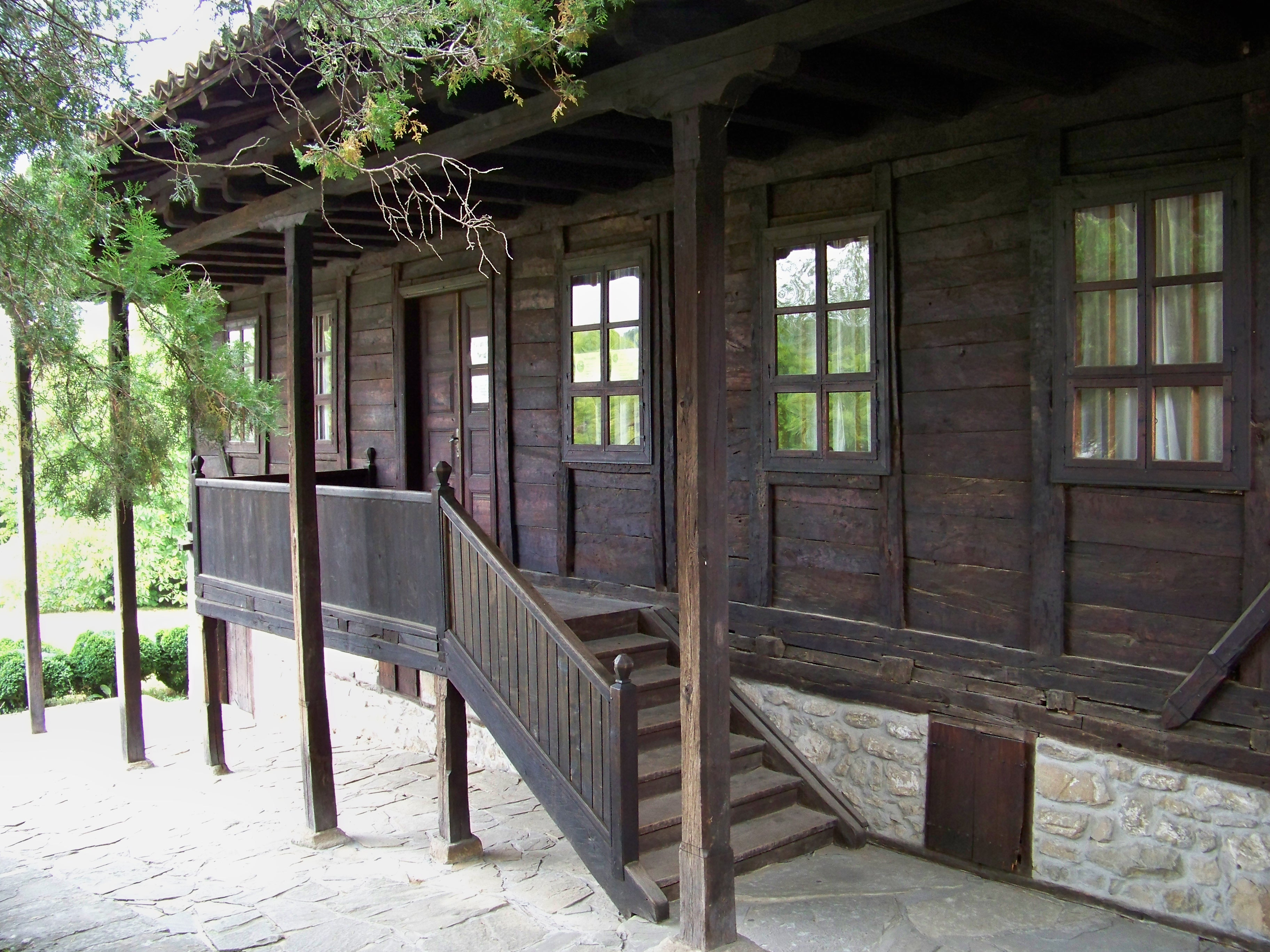

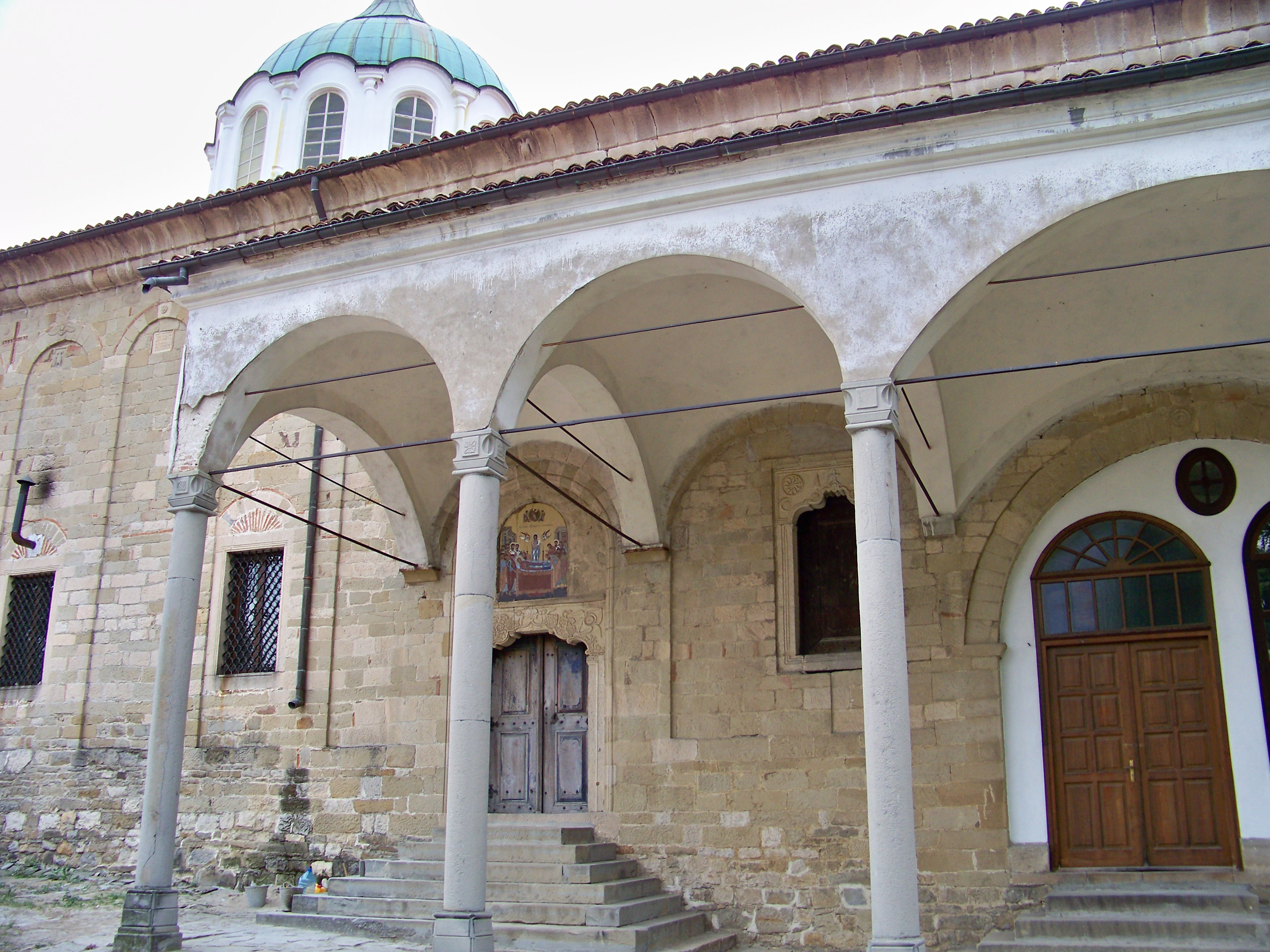

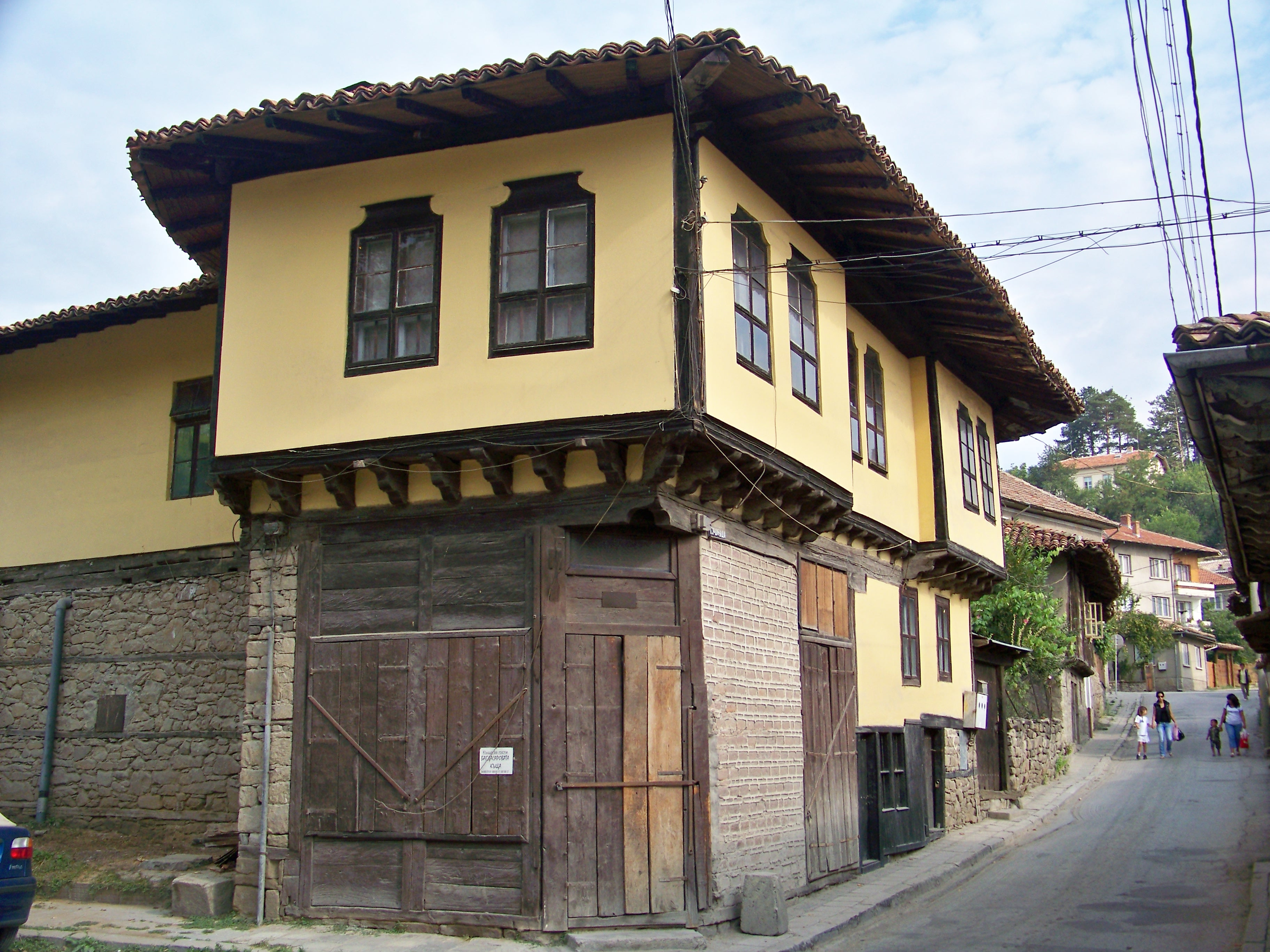

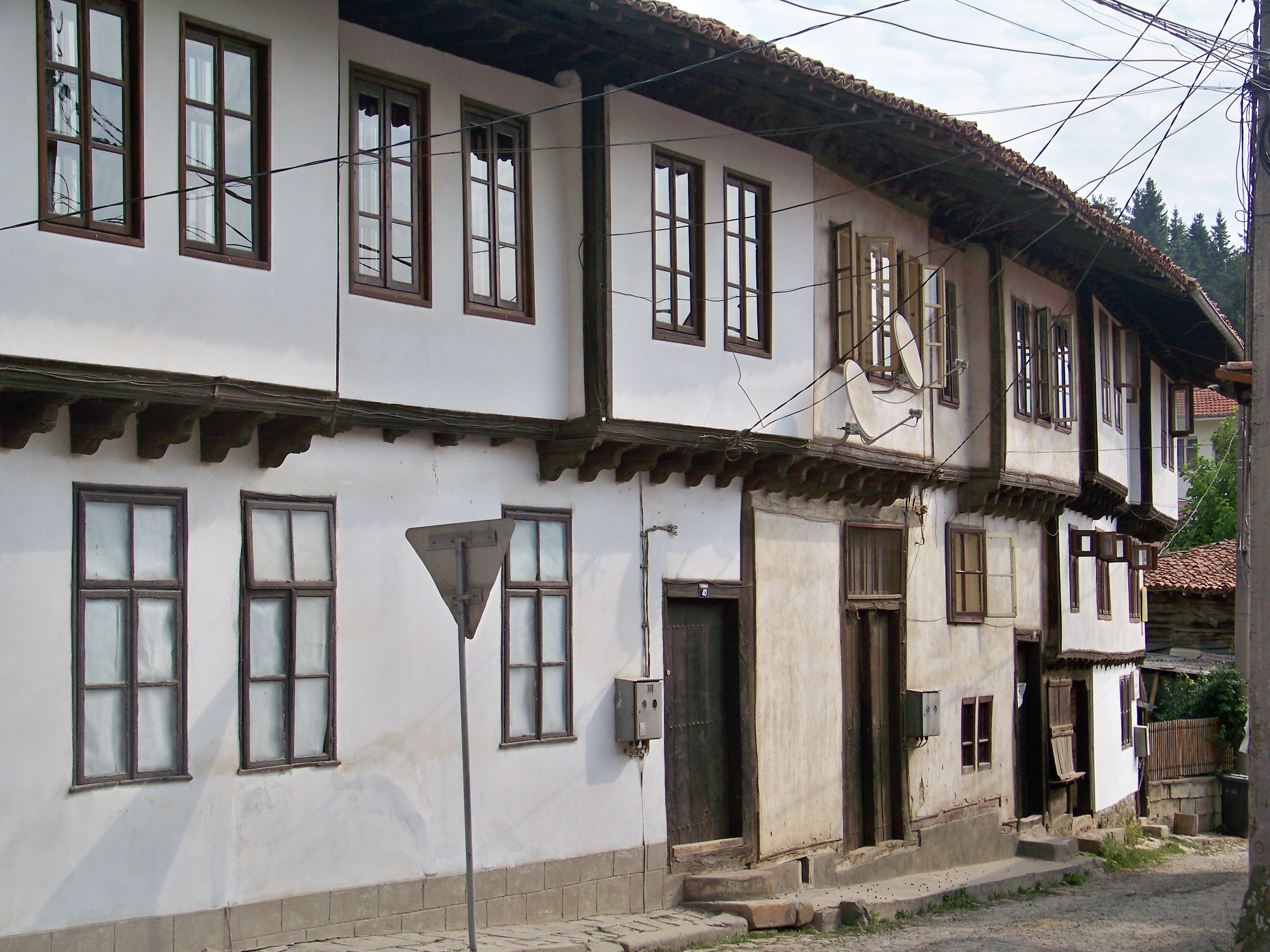

== Cuisine ==
- "Elenski but" - Elena pork leg
- Fillet “Elena” (ribitsa)
- Elena plum rakia (brandy): Unlike the grape-rich southern sides of the Middle Balkan range, its northern sides (up to 20–25 km; 15 miles away from the mountains ridge) are known by the better conditions for fruit-growing rather than grape-growing. This has led to specific traditions of producing spirit beverages for the last 200–300 years. Although the richest local landowners – who possessed lands in remote from the Balkan areas – could have afforded producing wine on their own, it was set as a tradition for the locals that they would produce plum rakia (brandi).

== Honour ==
Elena Peak on Livingston Island in the South Shetland Islands, Antarctica is named after Elena.

== See also ==
- Elenski but, a traditional local dry-cured ham and a popular delicacy throughout Bulgaria
