= Veliko Tarnovo Province =

Province in northern Bulgaria

Coordinates: 43°19′N 25°33′E

Veliko Tǎrnovo Province Област Велико Търново
- Province
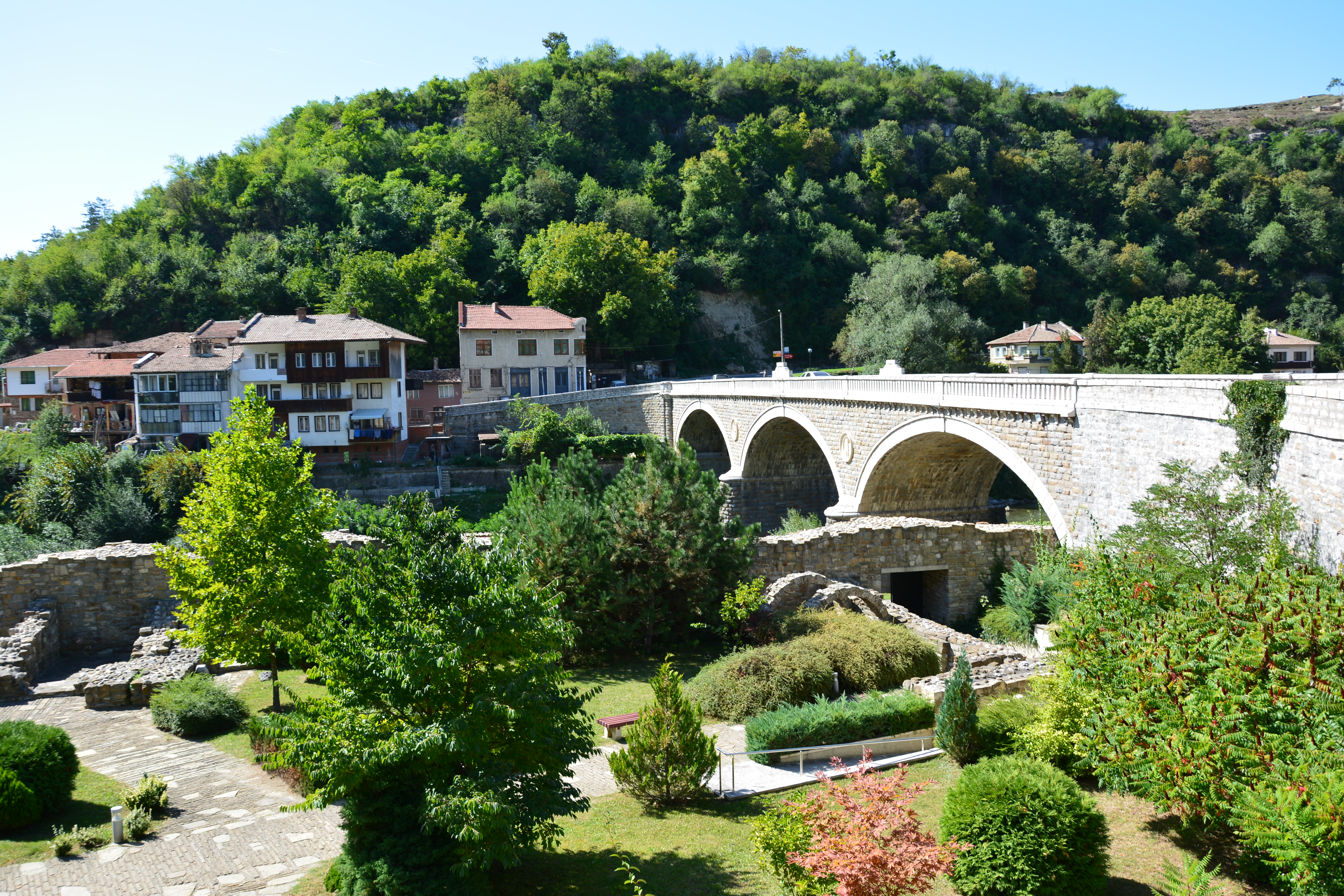
- Vladishki Bridge

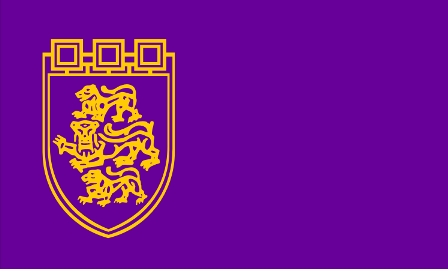
- Flag

- Location of Veliko Tarnovo Province in Bulgaria
- Country: Bulgaria
- Capital: Veliko Tarnovo
- Municipalities: 10

Government
  - Governor: Lyubomira Popova

Area
  - Total: 4,662 km^{2} (1,800 sq mi)

Population (December 2022)
  - Total: 204,033
  - Density: 43.77/km^{2} (113.4/sq mi)
- Time zone: UTC+2 (EET)
  - Summer (DST): UTC+3 (EEST)
- License plate: BT
- Website: www.vt.government.bg

Veliko Tarnovo (Bulgarian: Област Велико Търново, romanized: Oblast Veliko Tǎrnovo) is a province in the middle of the northern part of Bulgaria. Its capital city, Veliko Tarnovo, is of historical significance as it was the capital of the Second Bulgarian Empire. The province is divided into ten municipalities with a total population, as of December 2009, of 275,395.

Other towns in the province include Gorna Oryahovitsa, which is within 10 km (6.2 mi) of Veliko Tarnovo, Svishtov, set on the Danube River and famous for its Tsenov Academy of Economics, and Suhindol, the hometown of Lovico — an internationally recognised label for fine wines and spirits. Another notable place is the village of Arbanasi, set between Veliko Tarnovo and Gorna Oryahovitsa. The combination of old style and modern architecture, as well as its churches and monasteries, present the spirit of Bulgaria. Real estate is among the most expensive in the country.

== Municipalities ==
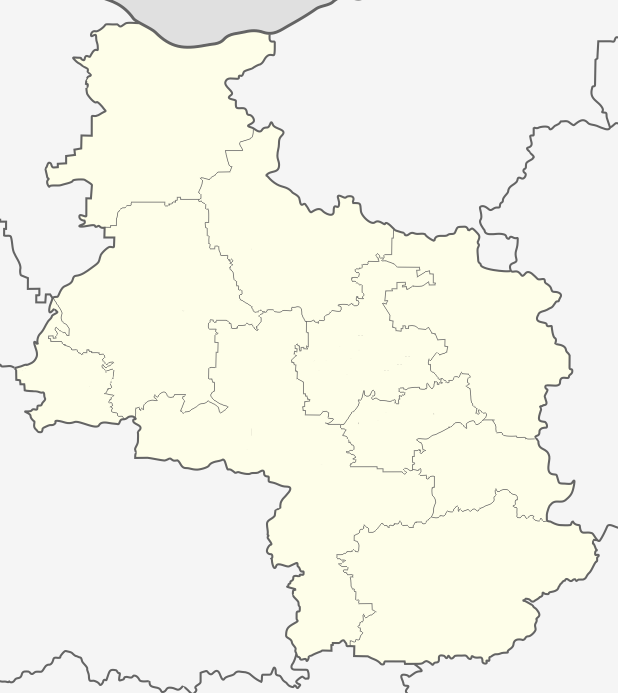

The Veliko Tarnovo oblast contains 10 municipalities (общини, obshtini). The following table shows the names of each municipality in English and Cyrillic, the main town (in bold) or village, and the population of each as of December 2009.

Municipality	Cyrillic	Pop.	Town/Village	Pop.
Elena	Елена	10,407	Elena	5,665
Gorna Oryahovitsa	Горна Оряховица	48,695	Gorna Oryahovitsa	32,436
Lyaskovets	Лясковец	13,677	Lyaskovets	8,277
Pavlikeni	Павликени	26,342	Pavlikeni	11,151
Polski Trambesh	Полски Тръмбеш	15,309	Polski Trambesh	4,546
Strazhitsa	Стражица	14,742	Strazhitsa	5,170
Suhindol	Сухиндол	3,046	Suhindol	2,146
Svishtov	Свищов	49,817	Svishtov	35,923
Veliko Tarnovo	Велико Търново	88,724	Veliko Tarnovo	67,099
Zlataritsa	Златарица	4,636	Zlataritsa	2,558

== Demographics ==
Historical population
Year	Pop.	±%
1946	352,179	—
1956	344,078	−2.3%
1965	339,473	−1.3%
1975	349,108	+2.8%
1985	339,518	−2.7%
1992	318,251	−6.3%
2001	293,172	−7.9%
2011	258,494	−11.8%
2021	207,371	−19.8%
Source: pop-stat.mashke.org

The Veliko Tarnovo province had a population of 293,294 (293,172 also given) according to a 2001 census, of which 48.3% were male and 51.6% were female.

As of the end of 2009, the population of the province, announced by the Bulgarian National Statistical Institute, numbered 275,395 of which 26% are inhabitants aged over 60 years.

=== Ethnic groups ===
Ethnic groups in Veliko Tarnovo Province (2011 census)
Ethnic group	Percentage
Bulgarians	90.3%
Turks	6.7%
Romani	1.7%
others and indefinable	1.3%

Total population (2011 census): 258 494

Ethnic groups (2011 census): Identified themselves: 233,992 persons:

- Bulgarians: 211 353 (90,32%)
- Turks: 15 709 (6,71%)
- Romani: 3 875 (1,65%)
- Others and indefinable: 3 055 (1,31%)

A further 25,000 persons in the Province did not declare their ethnic group at the 2011 census.

=== Religion ===
Religions in Veliko Tarnovo Province (2011 census)
Religious group	Percentage
Orthodox Christian	62.16%
Muslim	4.6%
Roman Catholic Christian	1.26%
Protestant Christian	0.5%
others and indefinable	31.41%

Religious adherence in the province according to 2001 census:

Census 2001
religious adherence	population	%
Orthodox Christians	254,914	86.95%
Muslims	26,085	8.90%
Roman Catholics	3,111	1.06%
Protestants	417	0.14%
Other	1,141	0.39%
Religion not mentioned	7,504	2.56%
total	293,172	100%

== Geography ==
=== Climate ===
Climate data for Veliko Tarnovo - Gorna Oryahovitsa, Bulgaria (1960-1990)
Month	Jan	Feb	Mar	Apr	May	Jun	Jul	Aug	Sep	Oct	Nov	Dec	Year
Mean daily maximum °C (°F)	2.1 (35.8)	5.7 (42.3)	11.4 (52.5)	18.6 (65.5)	23.4 (74.1)	27.0 (80.6)	29.6 (85.3)	29.8 (85.6)	26.0 (78.8)	19.4 (66.9)	12.4 (54.3)	5.1 (41.2)	17.5 (63.5)
Daily mean °C (°F)	−2.3 (27.9)	0.7 (33.3)	5.5 (41.9)	12.1 (53.8)	17.2 (63.0)	20.7 (69.3)	22.9 (73.2)	22.4 (72.3)	18.1 (64.6)	12.4 (54.3)	6.9 (44.4)	0.9 (33.6)	11.5 (52.7)
Mean daily minimum °C (°F)	−6.8 (19.8)	−4.3 (24.3)	−0.2 (31.6)	5.3 (41.5)	10.0 (50.0)	13.5 (56.3)	15.2 (59.4)	14.5 (58.1)	10.7 (51.3)	6.1 (43.0)	2.4 (36.3)	−3.1 (26.4)	5.3 (41.5)
Average precipitation mm (inches)	48 (1.9)	44 (1.7)	43 (1.7)	63 (2.5)	88 (3.5)	86 (3.4)	65 (2.6)	56 (2.2)	41 (1.6)	45 (1.8)	51 (2.0)	50 (2.0)	680 (26.9)
Source: Stringmeteo.com

== See also ==
- Provinces of Bulgaria
- Municipalities of Bulgaria
- List of cities and towns in Bulgaria
- List of villages in Veliko Tarnovo Province
