= List of earthquakes in Bulgaria =

This list of earthquakes in Bulgaria is organized by date and includes events that caused injuries/fatalities, historic quakes, as well events that are notable for other reasons.

Seismic hazard map of Bulgaria, showing the calculated Peak Ground Acceleration in terms of g for a 475-year period

== Earthquakes ==
Key

- Epicenter outside Bulgaria

| Name | Date | Epicentre | Mag. | MMI | Depth (km) | Notes | Deaths | Injuries |
|---|---|---|---|---|---|---|---|---|
| 1802 Vrancea earthquake | 1802-10-14 | Vrancea Mountains, Romania | 7.9 | VIII | 150.0 | The cities of Ruse, Silistra, Varna and Vidin were almost completely destroyed. | | |
| 1818 Sofia earthquake | 1818-04-25 | near Sofia | 6.0 | VII | | | | |
| 1838 Vrancea earthquake | 1838-01-11 | Vrancea Mountains, Romania | 7.5 | VII | | Felt across much of the country, damage reported in northern Bulgaria. | | |
| 1858 Sofia earthquake | 1858-09-30 | near Sofia | 6.6 | IX | 9.0 | 70-80% of buildings in Sofia suffered damage. | 4 | |
| 1901 Black Sea earthquake | 1901-03-31 | off Cape Kaliakra | 7.2 | X | 14.0 | More than 1,200 houses destroyed. Quake generated a 4–5 m high tsunami that devastated coastal communities on both sides of the Bulgarian-Romanian border. | 4 | 50+ |
| 1904 Kresna earthquakes | 1904-04-04 | near Krupnik | 7.2 M_{s} | | 11.0 | One of the largest shallow 20th century earthquakes on land in the Balkans, preceded by a very powerful 7.1 foreshock. Felt as far away as Budapest, Hungary. | 200+ | |
| 1908 Gorna Oryahovitza earthquake | 1908-01-10 | near Gorna Oryahovitza | 7.0 | | | First quake locally measured via seismograph, after one was installed in Sofia in 1905. | | |
| 1909 Gorna Oryahovitza earthquake | 1909-04-14 | near Gorna Oryahovitza | 7.0 | | | | | |
| 1913 Ruse earthquake | 1913-06-14 | southwest of Ruse | 6.6 | | 15.0 | | 37 | |
| 1928 Chirpan–Plovdiv earthquakes | 1928-04-14 | near Chirpan | 7.1 and 7.1 | IX | 10.0 | Followed by a 7.1 aftershock at a depth of 15.0 km on April 18. More than 26,000 buildings were destroyed, another 21,000 were severely damaged. | 127 | 500 |
| 1942 Razgrad earthquake | 1942-03-17 | near Razgrad | 5.1 | | | Large parts of the city were damaged. | | |
| 1977 Vrancea earthquake | 1977-03-04 | Vrancea Mountains, Romania | 7.2 | VIII | 94.0 | Most casualties occurred in Svishtov when several apartment buildings collapsed. Widely felt across the entire country, with minor damage reported as far south as Plovdiv. | 120 | 165 |
| 1977 Velingrad earthquake | 1977-11-03 | near Velingrad | 5.2 | VI | 6.0 | Nearly 800 buildings were damaged across several counties. | | |
| 1986 Strazhitsa earthquake | 1986-12-07 | near Strazhitsa | 5.6 | VII | 20.5 | 80% of buildings in Strazhitsa were deemed 'uninhabitable' after the quake, with 150 being completely destroyed. The town was later rebuilt. | 3 | 80 |
| 1990 Vrancea earthquakes | 1990-05-30 | Vrancea Mountains, Romania | 6.7 | V | 89.0 | Moderate damage in northeastern Bulgaria. Main event was followed by a 6.1 aftershock on May 31. | 1 | |
| 2004 Vrancea earthquake | 2004-10-27 | Vrancea Mountains, Romania | 6.0 | V | | Felt across the country, some damage reported in northeastern Bulgaria. | | |
| 2012 Pernik earthquake | 2012-05-22 | near Pernik | 5.6 | VI | 10.0 | Caused at least €11,000,000 worth of damage, mostly in Pernik, and to a lesser degree in the capital Sofia. | 1 | |
| 2014 Aegean Sea earthquake | 2014-05-24 | Aegean Sea | 6.9 | V | 6.4 | Widely felt across southern Bulgaria, minor damage reported in areas close to the Greek border. | | |

== Gallery ==
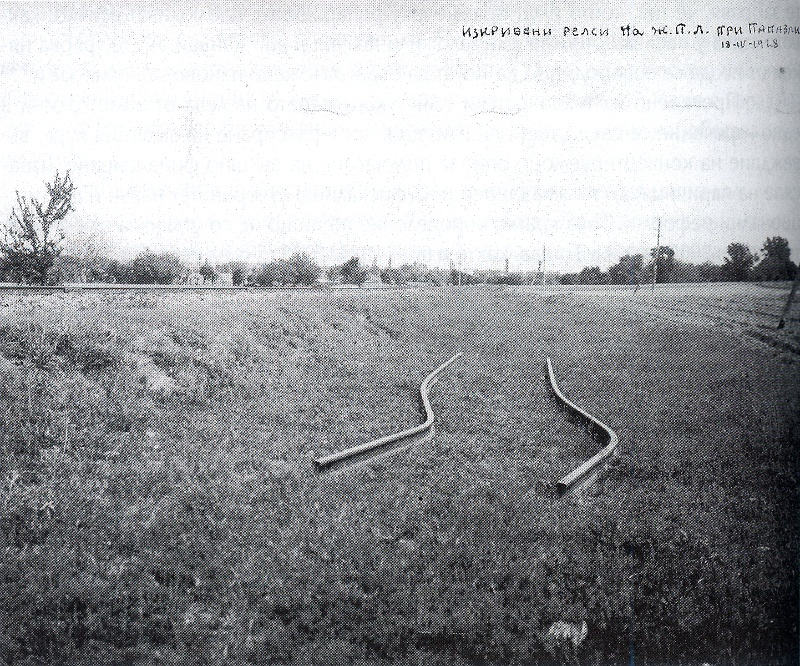
Bent rails after the 1928 Chirpan earthquake

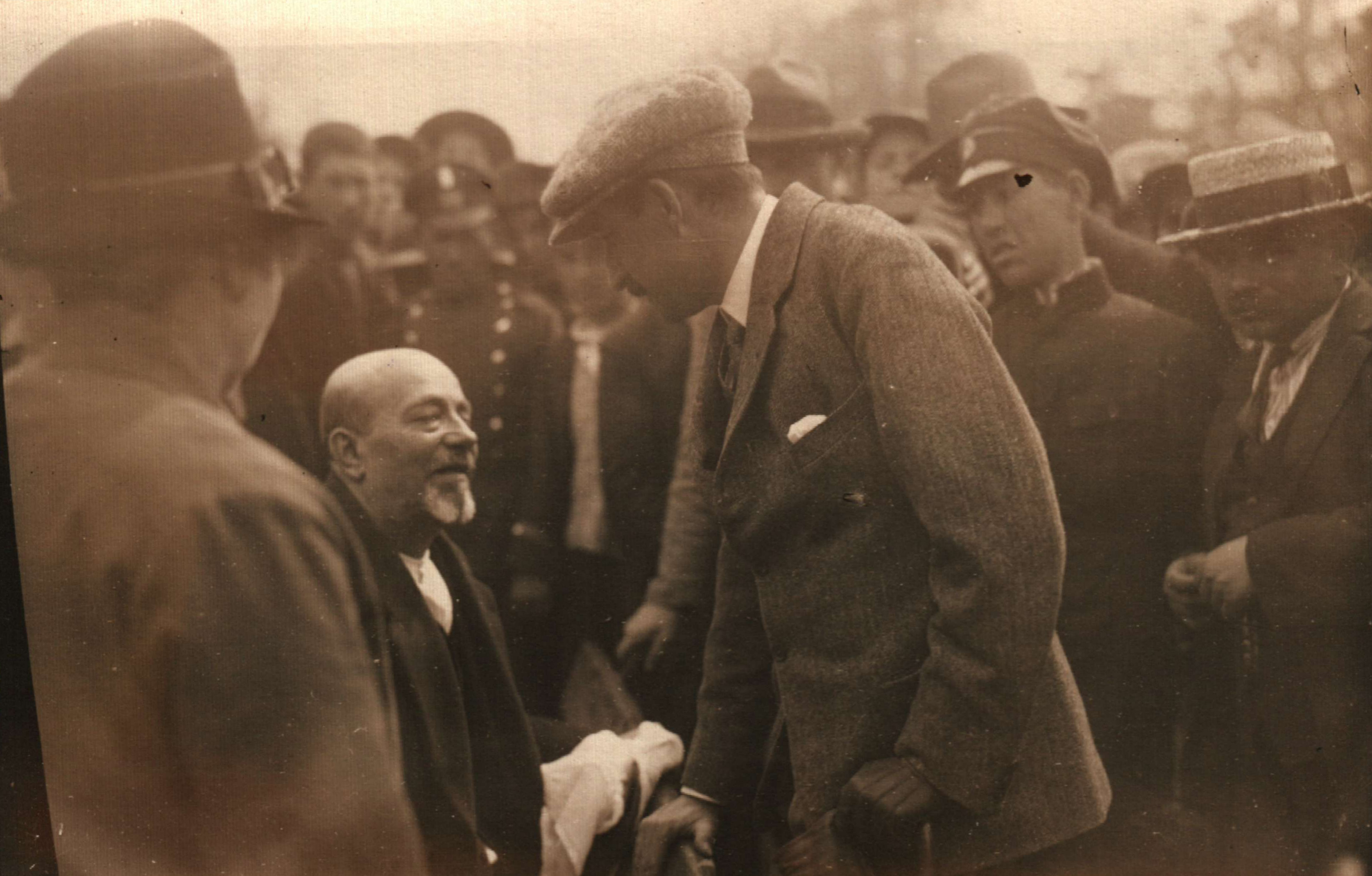
King Boris III of Bulgaria meeting with people from Plovdiv in the aftermath of the 1928 quake

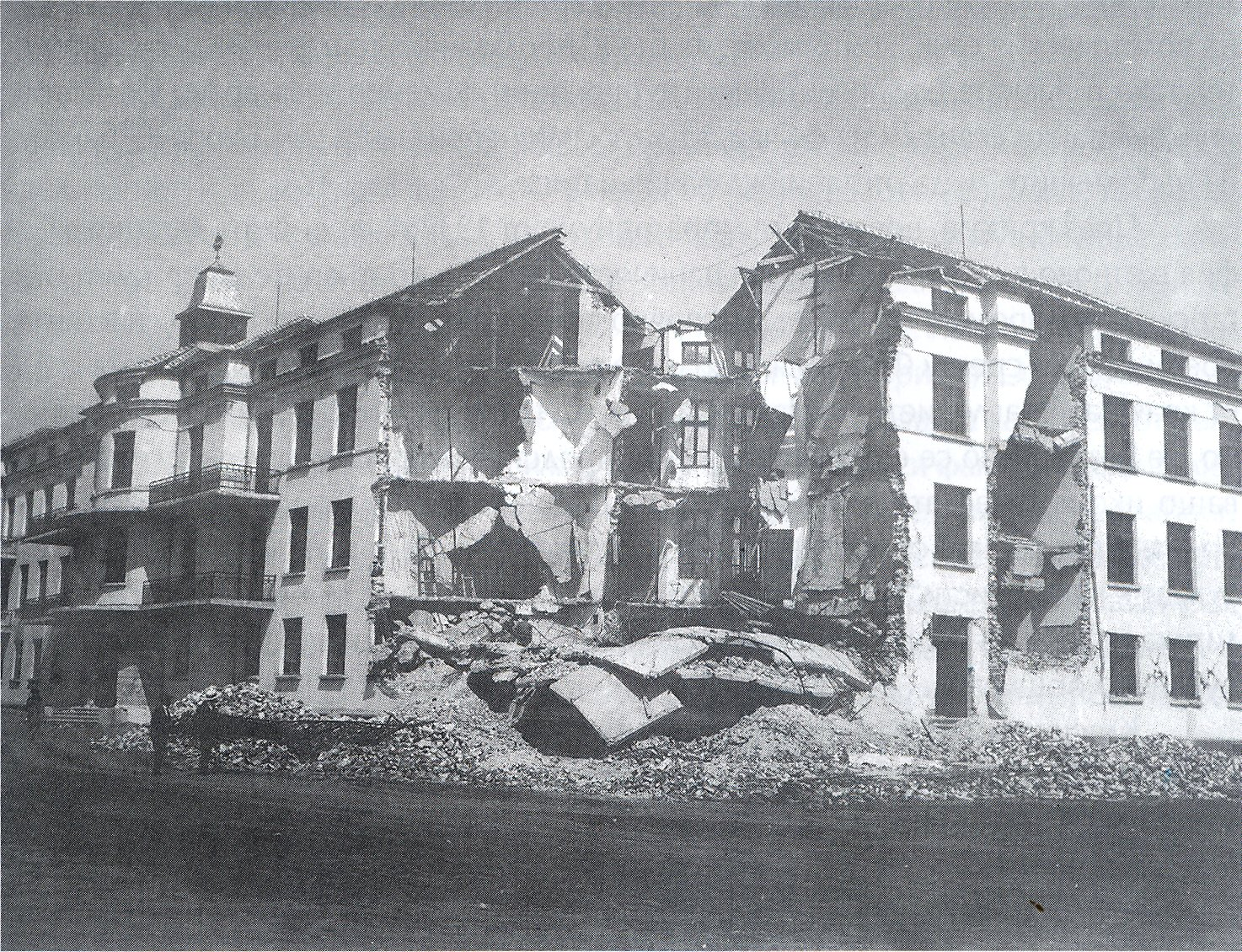
The Catholic Hospital in Plovdiv after the 1928 quake

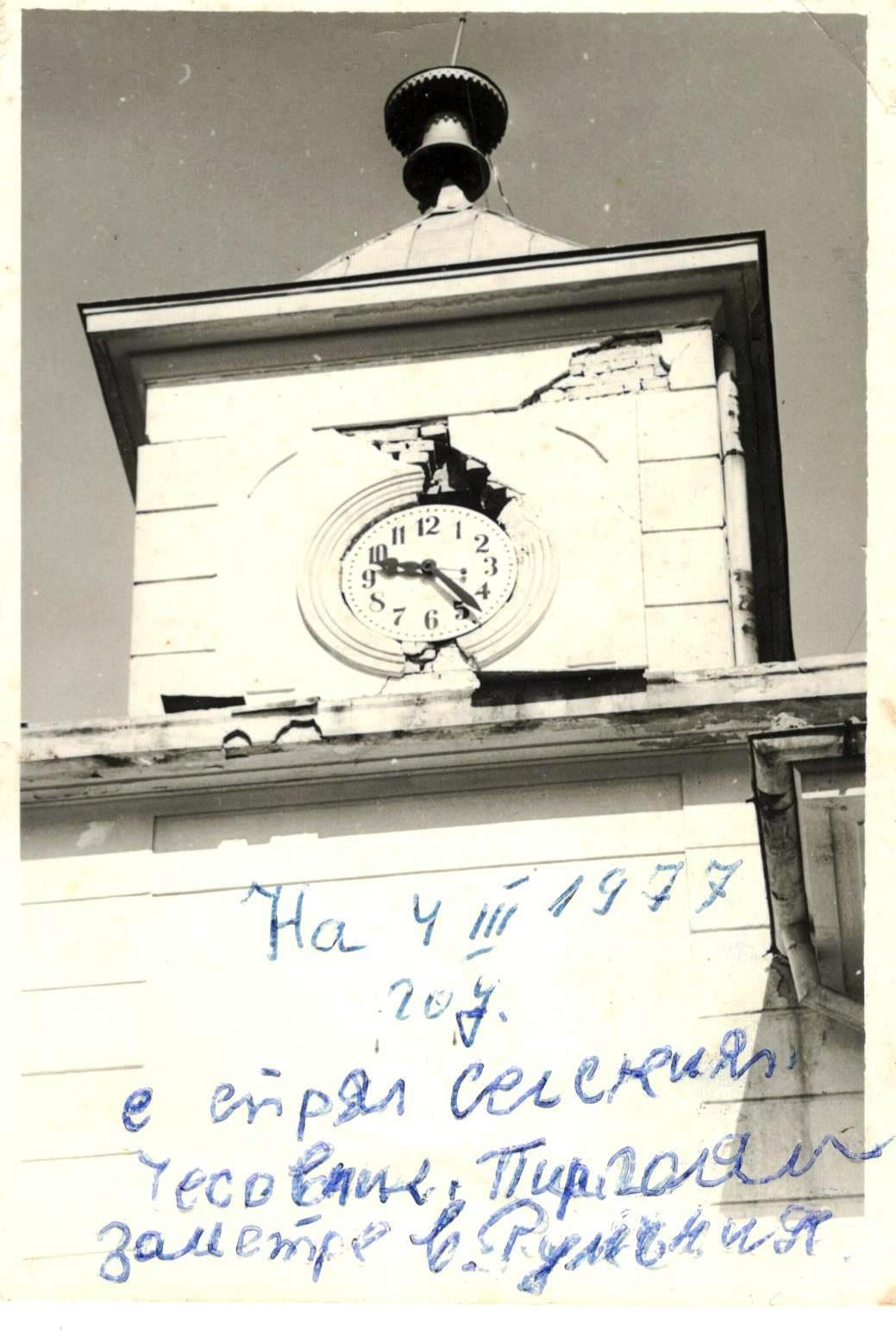
Damaged bell tower in the Bulgarian village of Yuper after the 1977 Vrancea earthquake

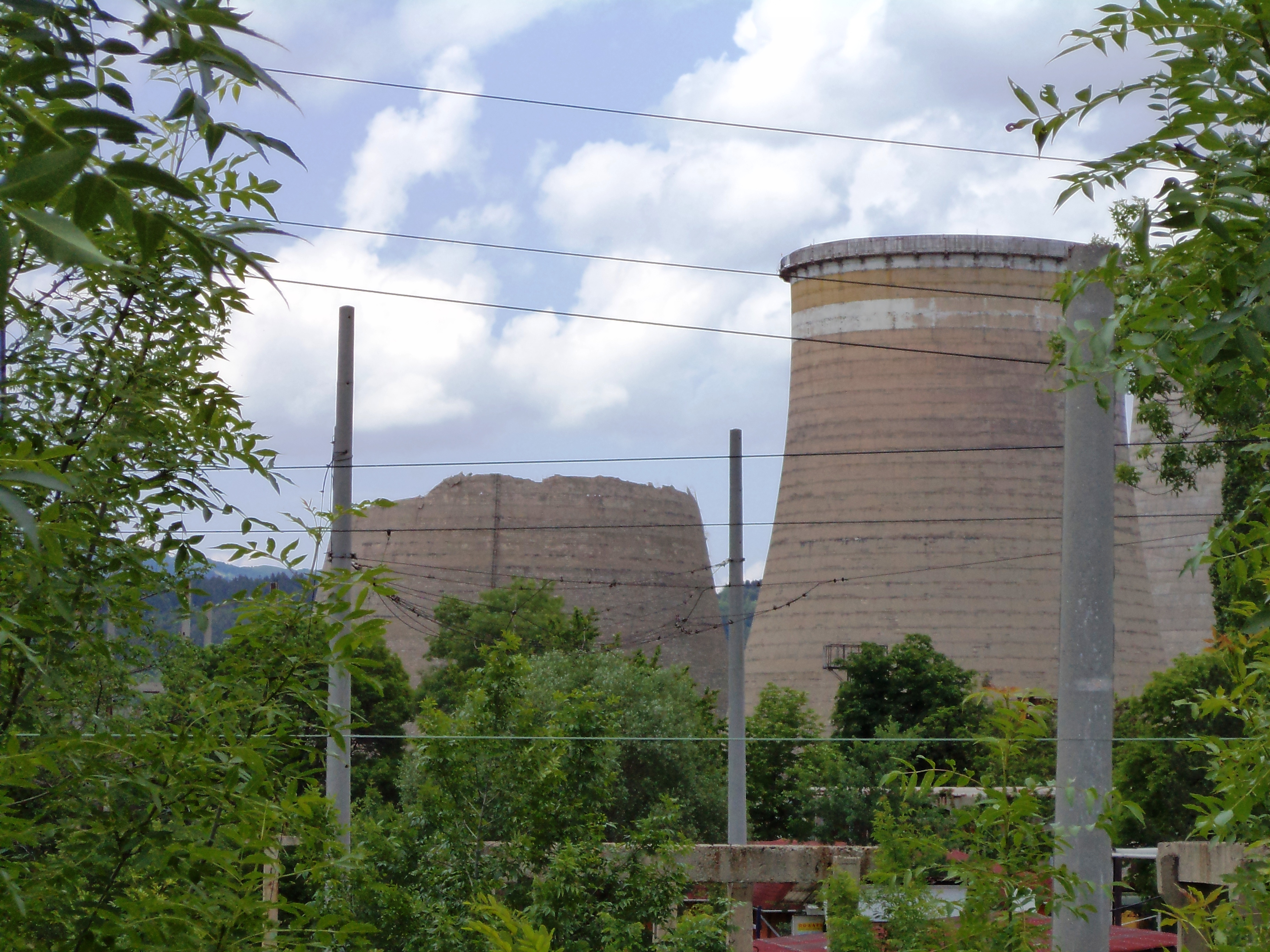
One of the three towers of the Republika Power Plant in Pernik collapsed after the 2012 earthquake

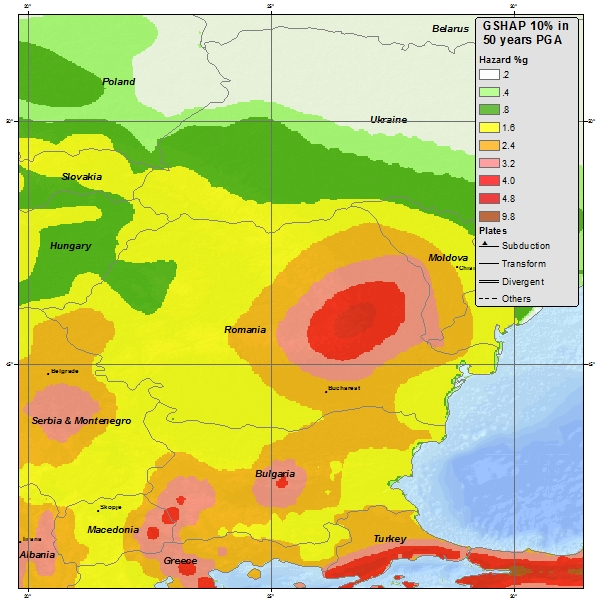
USGS seismic hazard map showing Bulgaria, as well as the Vrancea Mountains fault in central Romania

Bulgarian Academy of Sciences seismic hazard map showing maximum acceleration for a repeat period of 475 years

== See also ==
- List of earthquakes in Romania
- List of earthquakes in Italy
- List of earthquakes in Croatia
