= 2012 in Europe =

This is a list of 2012 events that occurred in Europe.

== Events ==
=== Albania ===
(Albania)

=== Andorra ===
(Andorra)

=== Azerbaijan ===
(Azerbaijan)

=== Belarus ===
(Belarus)

=== Belgium ===
(Belgium)

=== Bosnia and Herzegovina ===
(Bosnia and Herzegovina)

=== Bulgaria ===
(Bulgaria)

=== Croatia ===
(Croatia)

=== Czech Republic ===
(Czech Republic)

=== Cyprus ===
(Cyprus)

=== Denmark ===
(Denmark)

=== Estonia ===
(Estonia)

=== European Union ===
- President of the European Commission: José Manuel Barroso
- President of the Parliament:
  - Jerzy Buzek (until 17 January)
  - Martin Schulz (until 17 January)
- President of the European Council: Herman Van Rompuy
- Presidency of the Council of the EU:
  - Denmark (January–July)
  - Cyprus (July–December)

=== Finland ===
(Finland)

=== France ===
(France)

=== Germany ===
(Germany)

=== Georgia ===
(Georgia (country))

=== Greece ===
(Greece)

=== Hungary ===
(Hungary)

=== Iceland ===
(Iceland)

=== Ireland ===
(Republic of Ireland)

=== Italy ===
(Italy)

=== Latvia ===
(Latvia)

=== Liechtenstein ===
(Liechtenstein)

=== Lithuania ===
(Lithuania)

=== Luxembourg ===
(Luxembourg)

=== Malta ===
(Malta)

=== Moldova ===
(Moldova)

=== Monaco ===
(Monaco)

=== Montenegro ===
(Montenegro)

=== Netherlands ===
(Netherlands)

=== North Macedonia ===
(North Macedonia)

=== Norway ===
(Norway)

=== Poland ===
(Poland)

=== Portugal ===
(Portugal)

=== Romania ===
(Romania)

=== Russia ===
(Russia)

=== San Marino ===
(San Marino)

=== Serbia ===
(Serbia)

=== Slovakia ===
(Slovakia)

=== Slovenia ===
(Slovenia)

=== Spain ===
(Spain)

=== Sweden ===
(Sweden)

=== Switzerland ===
(Switzerland)

=== Turkey ===
(Turkey)

=== Ukraine ===
(Ukraine)

=== United Kingdom ===
(United Kingdom)

=== Vatican City ===
(Vatican City)

== Events ==
=== January ===
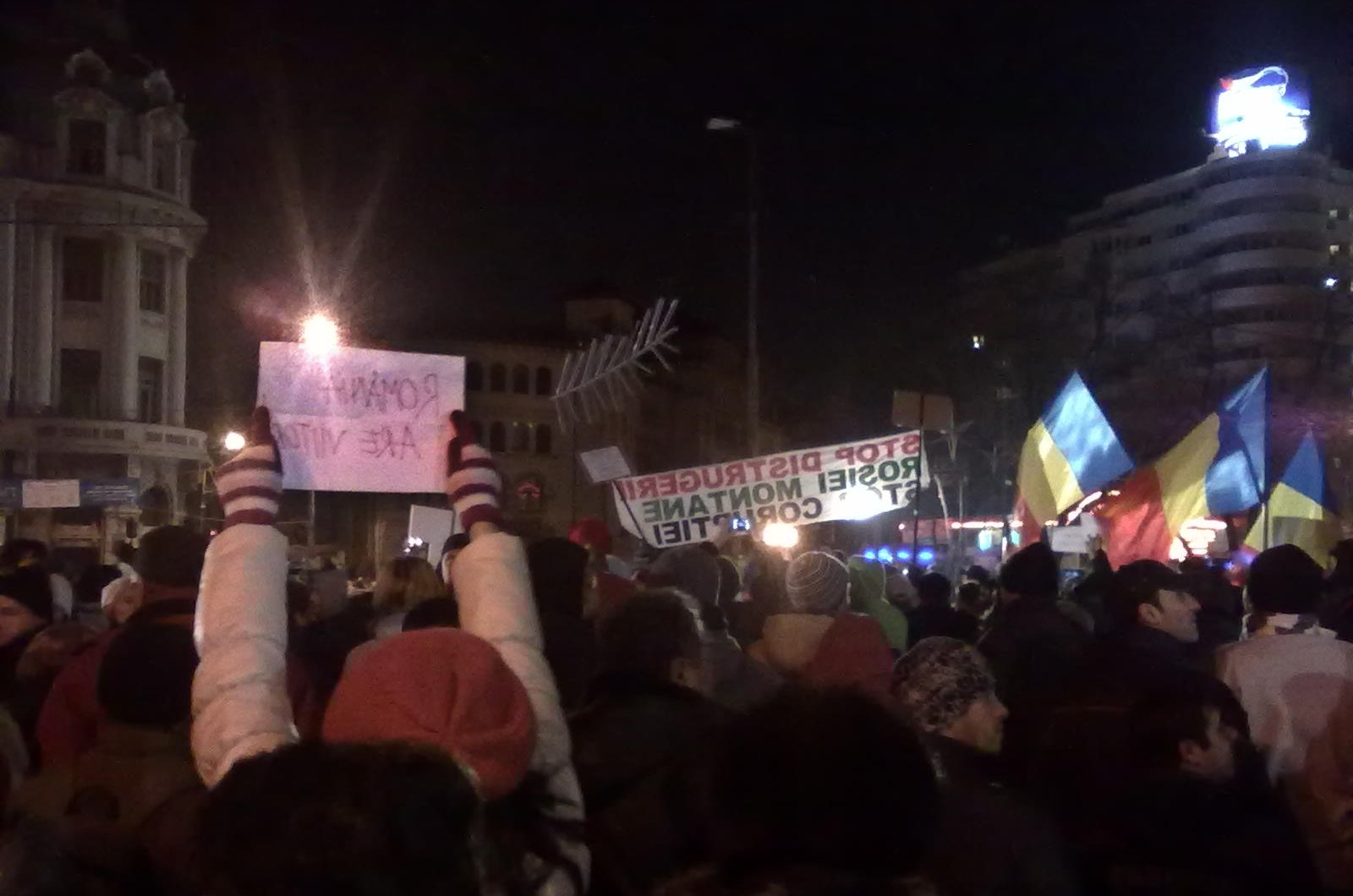
Demonstrations against Romanian President Traian Băsescu in Bucharest

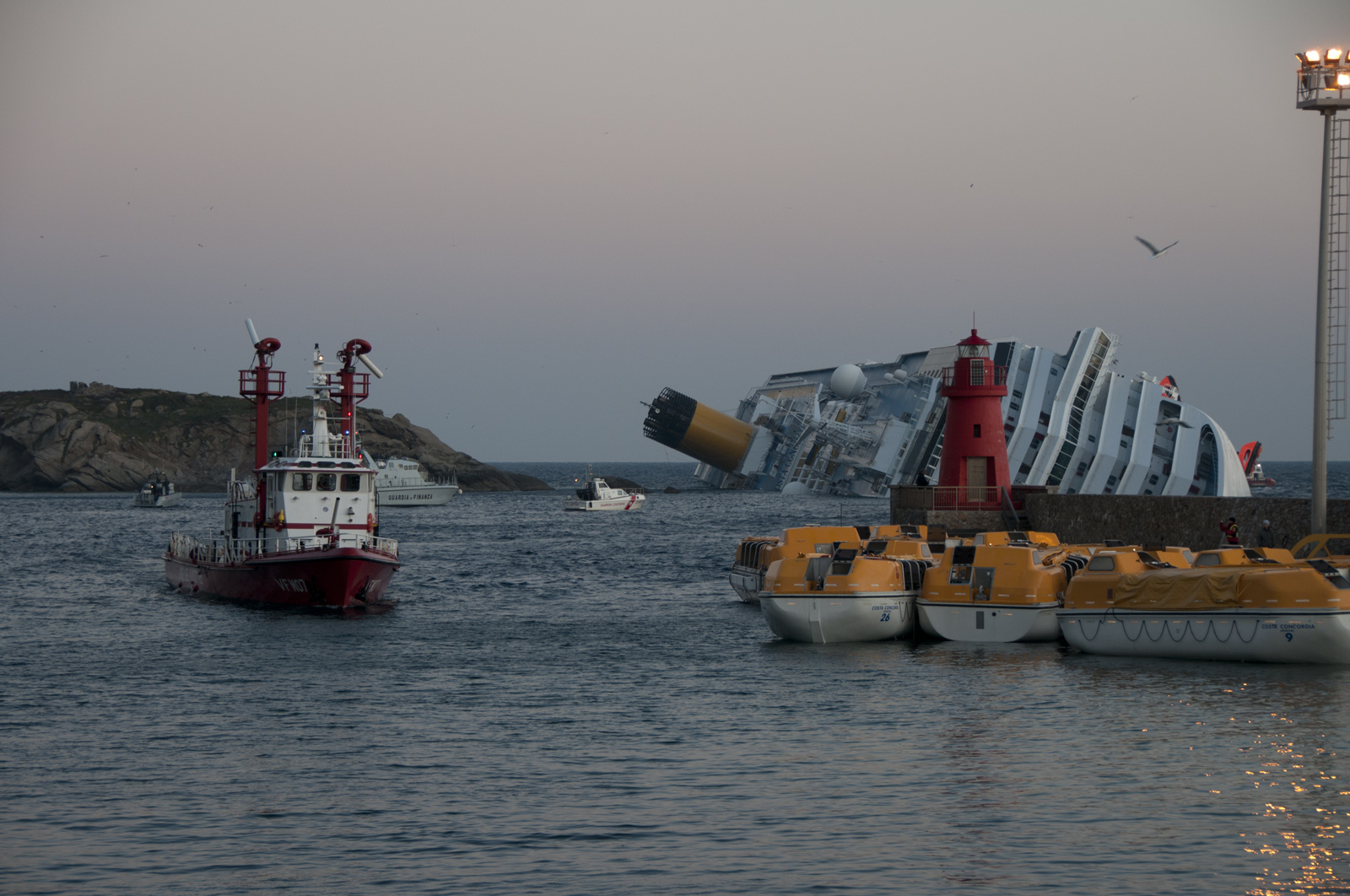
Collision of Costa Concordia

- January 1: Denmark assumed the Presidency of the Council of the European Union from Poland.
- January 12: A series of street protests broke out in several cities across Romania. The protests turned violent, with both protesters and members of the Gendarmerie being injured during the ensuing clashes.
- January 13: The Italian cruise ship Costa Concordia partially sank on the night of January 13, 2012 after hitting a reef off the Italian coast and running aground at Isola del Giglio, Tuscany, requiring the evacuation of the 4,252 people on board. Thirty-two citizens drowned and other 64 people were injured.
- January 18: English version of Wikipedia was down for 24 hours in protest of SOPA and PIPA, two projects that provided for drastic measures against sites with "pirated" content. Were subsequently withdrawn.
- January 23: European Union foreign ministers have formally adopted an "unprecedented" oil embargo against Iran over its nuclear programme, banning all new oil contracts with the country.
- January 24: A violent blizzard ravages Central, Southeast and Eastern Europe. There were hundreds of casualties among homeless people. Snow caused traffic chaos in several countries like Italy and United Kingdom.
- January 30: Leaders of the 27 EU member states met in Brussels, at a special summit, to discuss a clear strategy against the debt crisis. In Belgium was held a general strike.

=== February ===
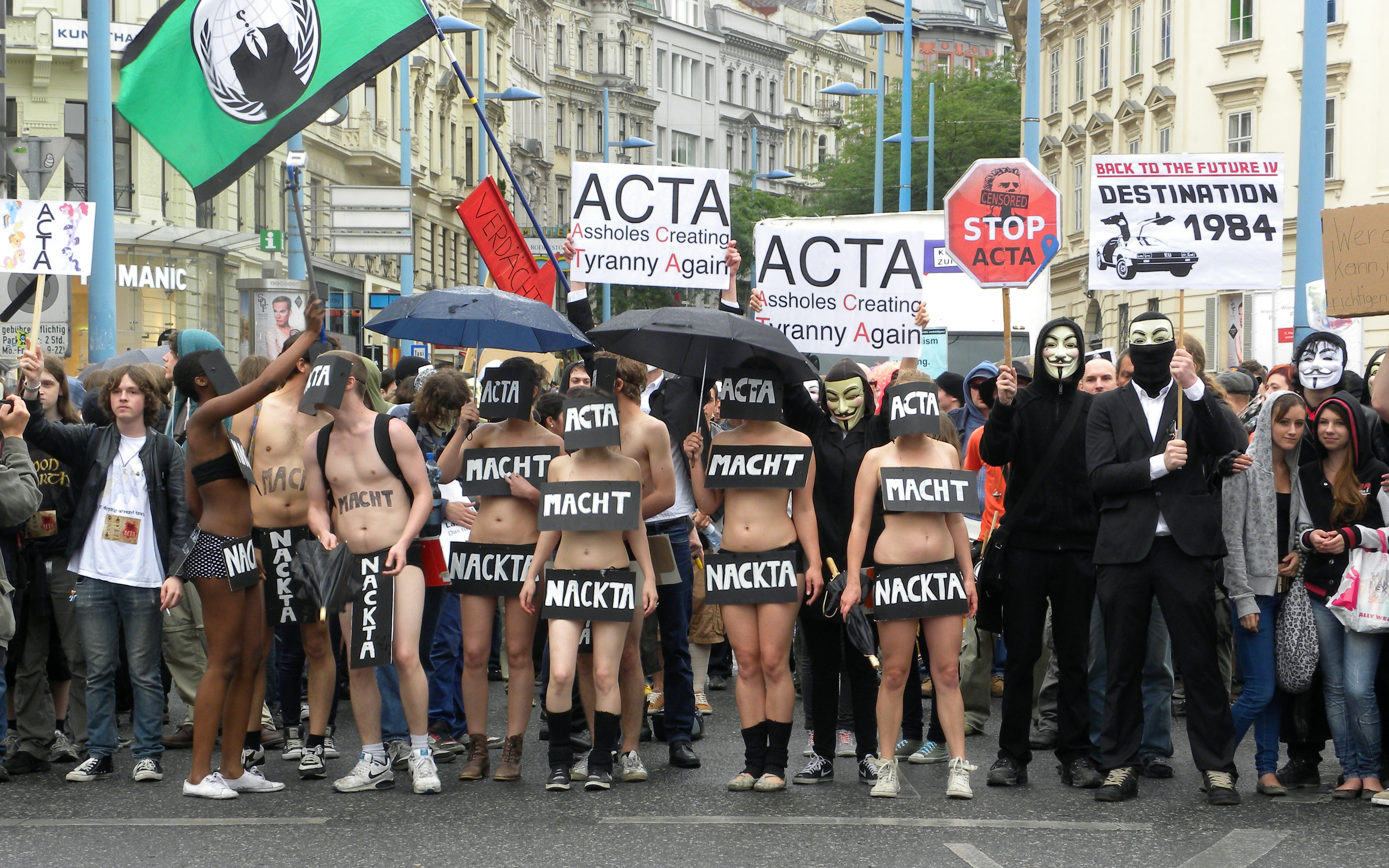
Anti-ACTA protests in Vienna, Austria

- February 5: National Coalition Party candidate and former finance minister Sauli Niinistö wins Finnish presidential election, easily beating his Green rival Pekka Haavisto. He is first conservative president since 1956.
- February 8: Italy's Mount Etna erupted into life during the night of 8–9 February, spewing forth lava fountains which brightened the midnight sky. The eruption followed a period of intermittent activity and produced a plume of ash which led to the temporary cancellation of some flights at the nearby Catania airport.
- February 11: Protests against ACTA in more than 200 European cities. Protests broke out in Poland, spreading in several European countries such as Sweden, Germany, France or Romania.
- February 12: 500,000 protesters gathered in Athens outside the Parliament House to voice opposition to Lucas Papademos' caretaker cabinet's austerity measures, the Fifth austerity package which was being debated in Parliament. Following these street demonstrations, 45 buildings were set ablaze, 25 protesters and 40 officers were injured.
- February 17: Christian Wulff resigned as President of Germany, facing the prospect of prosecution for allegations of corruption relating to his prior service as Prime Minister of Lower Saxony.
- February 19
  - Iran suspends oil exports to United Kingdom and France following sanctions put in place by the EU and the United States in January.
  - A series of explosions take place in a nightclub in Sighetu Marmaţiei (Romania). Following the deflagration, a citizen was killed and other 20 people were injured.
- February 21: Eurozone finance ministers reach an agreement on a second, €130-billion Greek bailout.

=== March ===
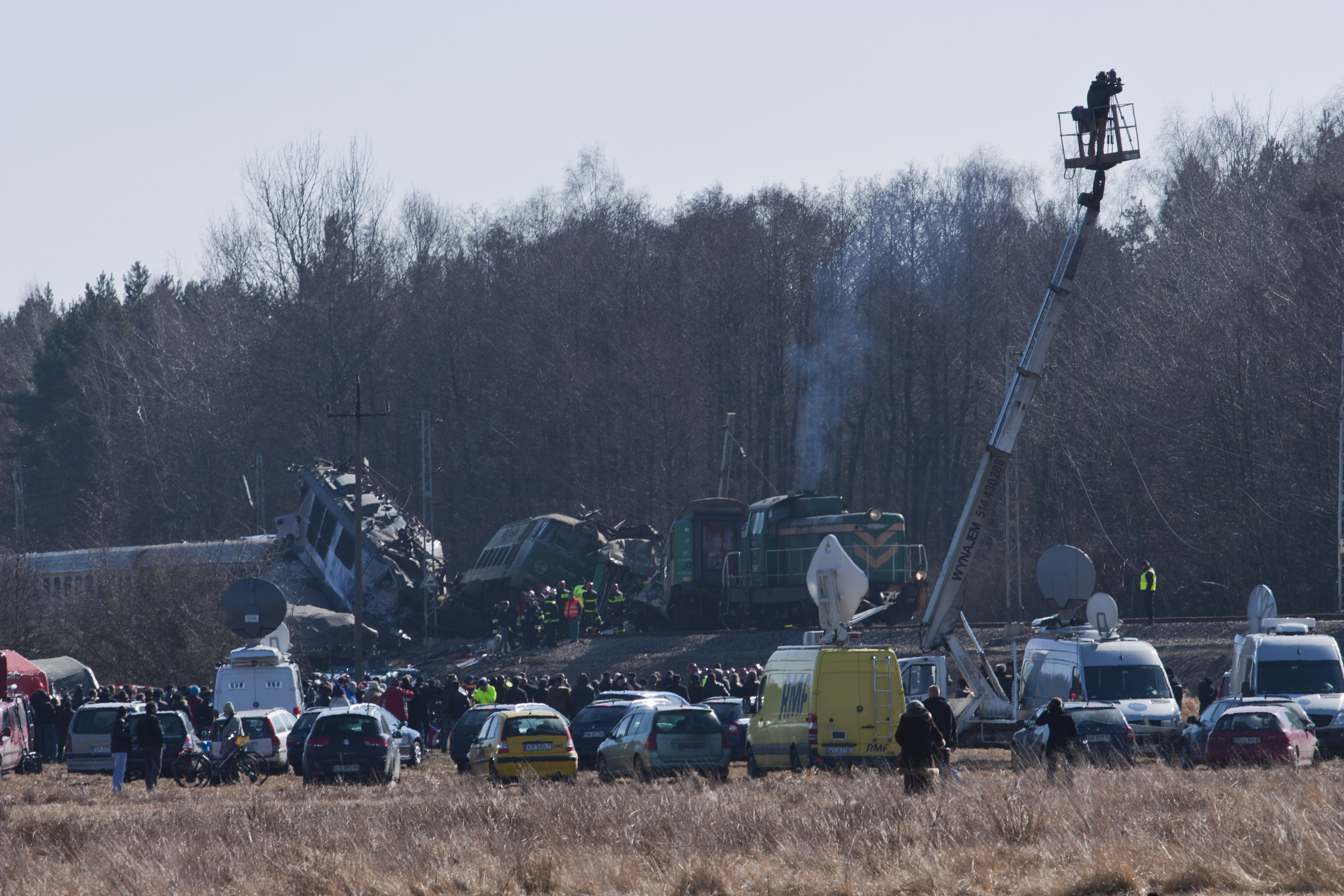
Szczekociny rail crash

- March 4
  - Prime Minister Vladimir Putin wins the presidential election in the first round with over 63% of the vote, beating veteran Communist opponent Gennady Zyuganov into second place on 17%. Putin will serve a newly extended six-year term, beginning in May. Organisation for Security and Cooperation in Europe observers report irregularities at a third of monitored polling stations. Opponents take to the streets of several major cities to protest at the conduct of the election, and the police arrest hundreds.
  - Two passenger trains have collided in southern Poland, near Szczekociny (Silesian Voivodeship), leaving 16 people dead and 58 hurt.
- March 5: A MAI employer shot eight people in a hair salon, Bucharest. Following the massacre, two people died and six others were seriously injured.
- March 13
  - A bus carrying Belgian and Dutch students returning from a ski holiday crashed into a wall in Sierre Tunnel (Switzerland), killing 28 people, of which 22 were 12-year-old students. Another 24 students were taken to hospital with injuries.
  - After 244 years since its first publication, the Encyclopædia Britannica discontinues its print edition.
  - EU finance ministers decided to block funds worth €495-million for Hungary, due to the excessive budget deficit.
- March 18: Former pastor Joachim Gauck was elected President of Germany, before his sole rival, Beate Klarsfeld.
- March 19
  - Mohammed Merah, adherent of the Islamist organization al-Qaeda, opened fire in Ozar Hatorah schoolyard (Toulouse, France), killing three children, a teenager and a rabbi. President Nicolas Sarkozy suspended his electoral campaign and announced maximum terrorist alert in Toulouse. The perpetrator was killed in the morning of March 22, following a siege at his apartment in Toulouse.
  - A series of devastating wildfires burst out in several Romanian counties.
- March 31: A blast at a chemical plant of Evonik Industries AG in the city of Marl in Germany's Ruhr valley killed at least one person and left two others injured.

=== April ===
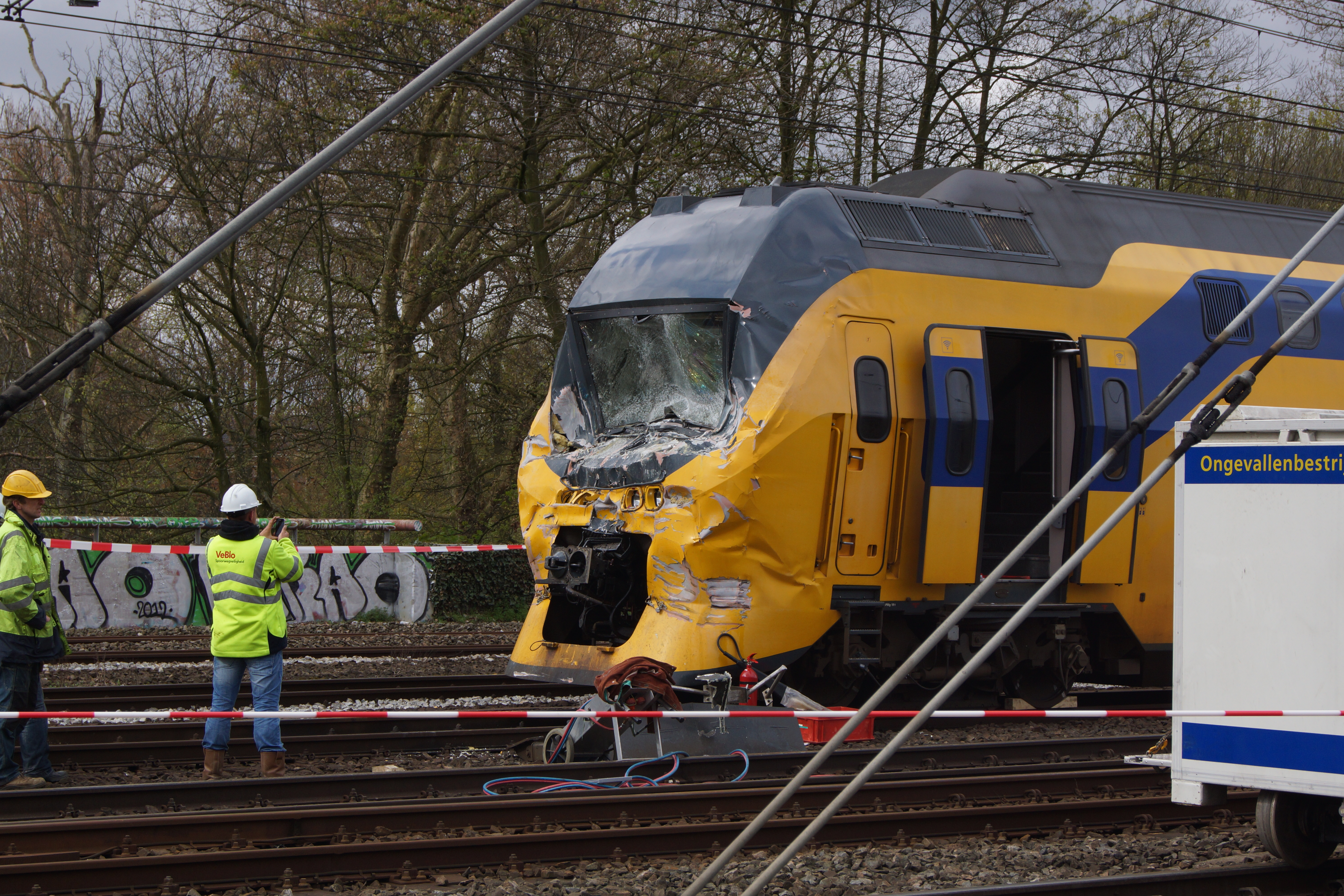
Train collision at Westerpark, Amsterdam

- April 2
  - A Russian passenger plane carrying 43 people has crashed shortly after take-off in Siberia. Only 12 passengers survived the tragedy.
  - President of Hungary, Pál Schmitt, resigned amid scandal on the withdrawal of his doctoral thesis.
- April 4: Serbian pro-Western President Boris Tadić resigned, paving the way for early presidential election where he will face strong challenge from a nationalist candidate.
- April 6
  - Members of the anti-terrorist squad of the Hungarian police have captured a man suspected of killing four relatives and injuring three others with a machete.
  - Six people, including three Romanians and three Austrians, were injured in an explosion at the Petrobrazi Refinery (Ploiești, Romania).
- April 8: Leonid Tibilov won the South Ossetian presidential election with 54.12% of votes in the second round run-off.
- April 13: Three people died and another 13 were injured when a German regional train collided with a works engine near the town of Offenbach am Main.
- April 16: The trial of Anders Behring Breivik, the perpetrator of the 2011 Norway attacks, started on April 16, 2012 in Oslo District Court. He recognized the odious killing of all 77 citizens, but claimed self-defense. Eventually, he received a maximum prison sentence of 21 years.
- April 21: About 117 people have been injured, at least 16 of them seriously, when two passenger trains collided head-on near Westerpark in Amsterdam, between Amsterdam Centraal railway station and Amsterdam Sloterdijk railway station.
- April 27
  - Four co-ordinated explosions have rocked the city of Dnipropetrovsk in eastern Ukraine, injuring at least 27 people.
  - Romania's government has been unseated in a no-confidence vote, just two months after taking office. The opposition seized on public anger over austerity measures to oust prime minister Mihai Răzvan Ungureanu. Romanian President Traian Băsescu designated left-wing opposition leader Victor Ponta as new prime minister.

=== May ===
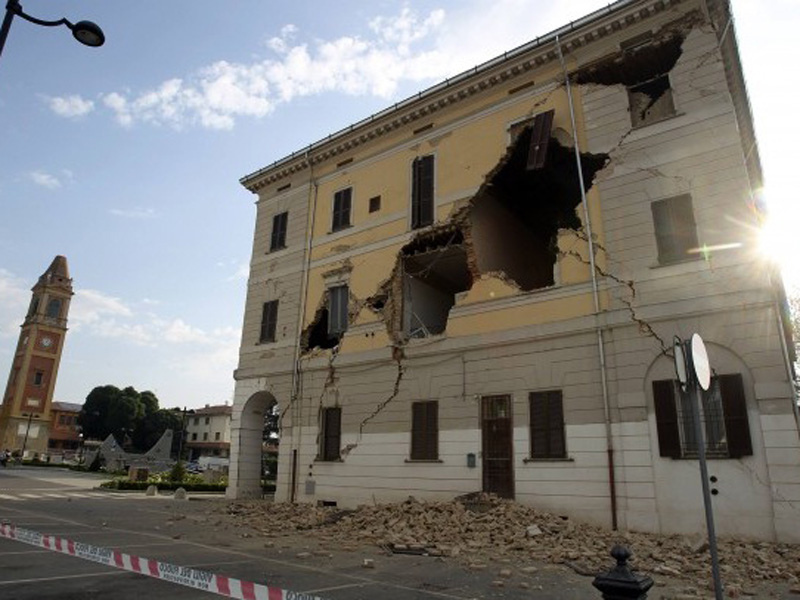
The damaged town hall of Sant'Agostino after 20 May earthquake

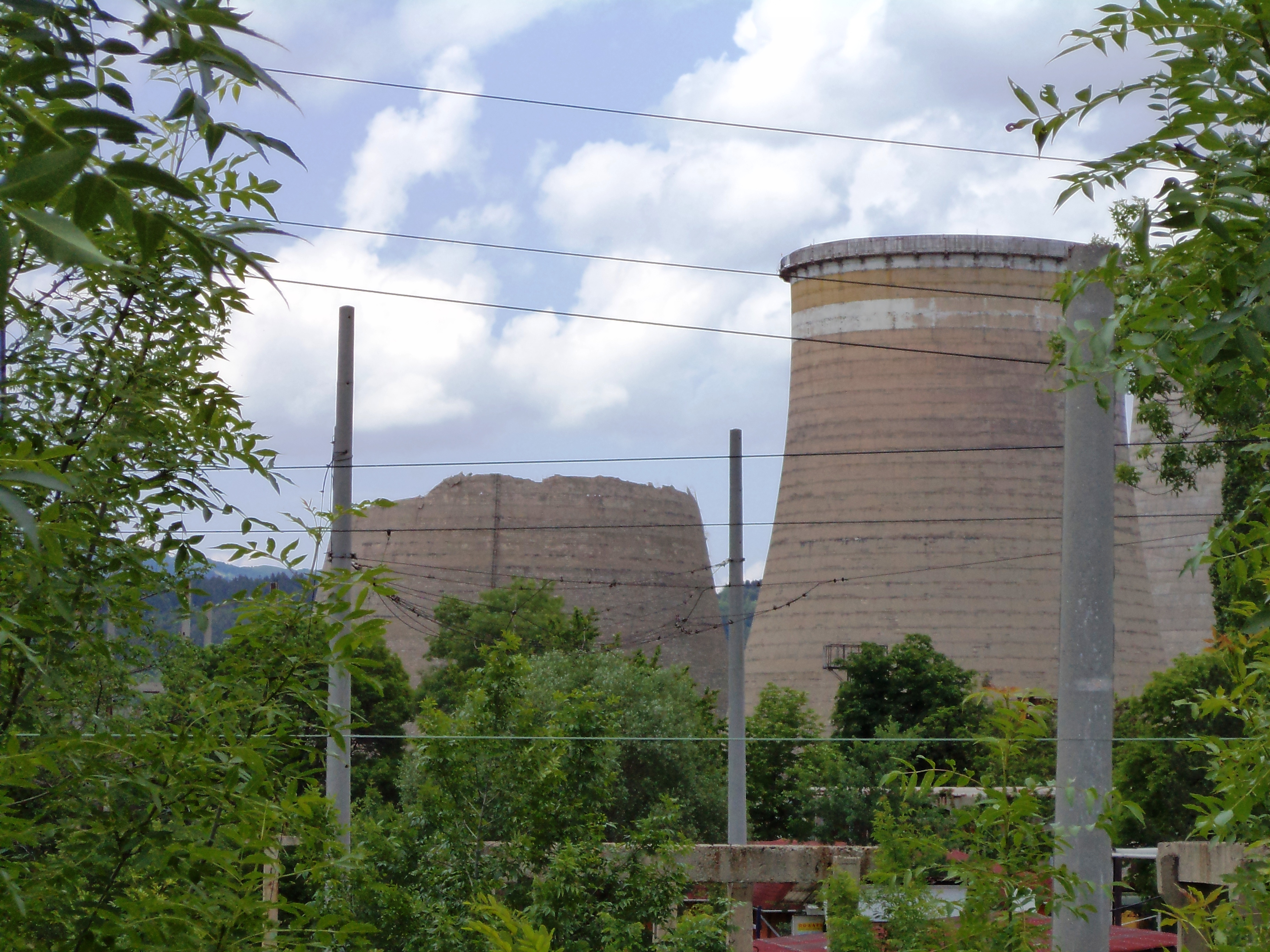
The damaged tower of Republika Power Plant (Pernik) after 22 May earthquake

- May 2: The Hungarian candidate János Áder was elected president with an absolute majority.
- May 3: At least eight people were killed and 20 injured in an apparent suicide car bomb attack and follow-up blast in the Russian city of Makhachkala.
- May 4: More than 140 people were injured at a political rally in the central square of Armenia's capital, when clusters of balloons exploded.
- May 6: François Hollande won the French presidential election with 51.64% of votes in the second round run-off.
- May 7: A magnitude 5.6 earthquake struck the western part of Azerbaijan, at a depth of 23 km. At least two people died following the seism. About 1,050 families whose homes were damaged during the earthquake were placed in tents.
- May 10: At least 116 people were injured after a crash involving three trams in western Bucharest, capital city of Romania.
- May 15: Nearly 7,000 demonstrators have marched through Moldova's capital Chișinău to denounce Russia's continued influence in their country.
- May 20: A magnitude 6.0 earthquake struck Northern Italy, at a depth of 5.1 km. Seven people died and over 50 others were injured. Castello Estense (Ferrara) and other structures of historical significance have been damaged or destroyed.
- May 21: At least 13 Albanian university students lost their lives when their bus plunged into a gorge near the town of Elbasan.
- May 22: A magnitude 5.6 earthquake struck 24 km west of Bulgaria's capital Sofia, at a depth of 9.4 km. A citizen died from heart attack, several buildings were damaged.
- May 25: Three people were killed and other 18 wounded after a suicide bombing in central Turkey.
- May 26: An 18-year-old man was arrested in Finland over a shooting spree that left two people dead and eight wounded.
- May 29: A magnitude 5.8 earthquake struck Medolla (Italy), at a depth of 9.6 km. At least 17 people were killed and over 350 injured. More than 15,000 people were left homeless, after their homes were seriously damaged or even destroyed.

=== June ===
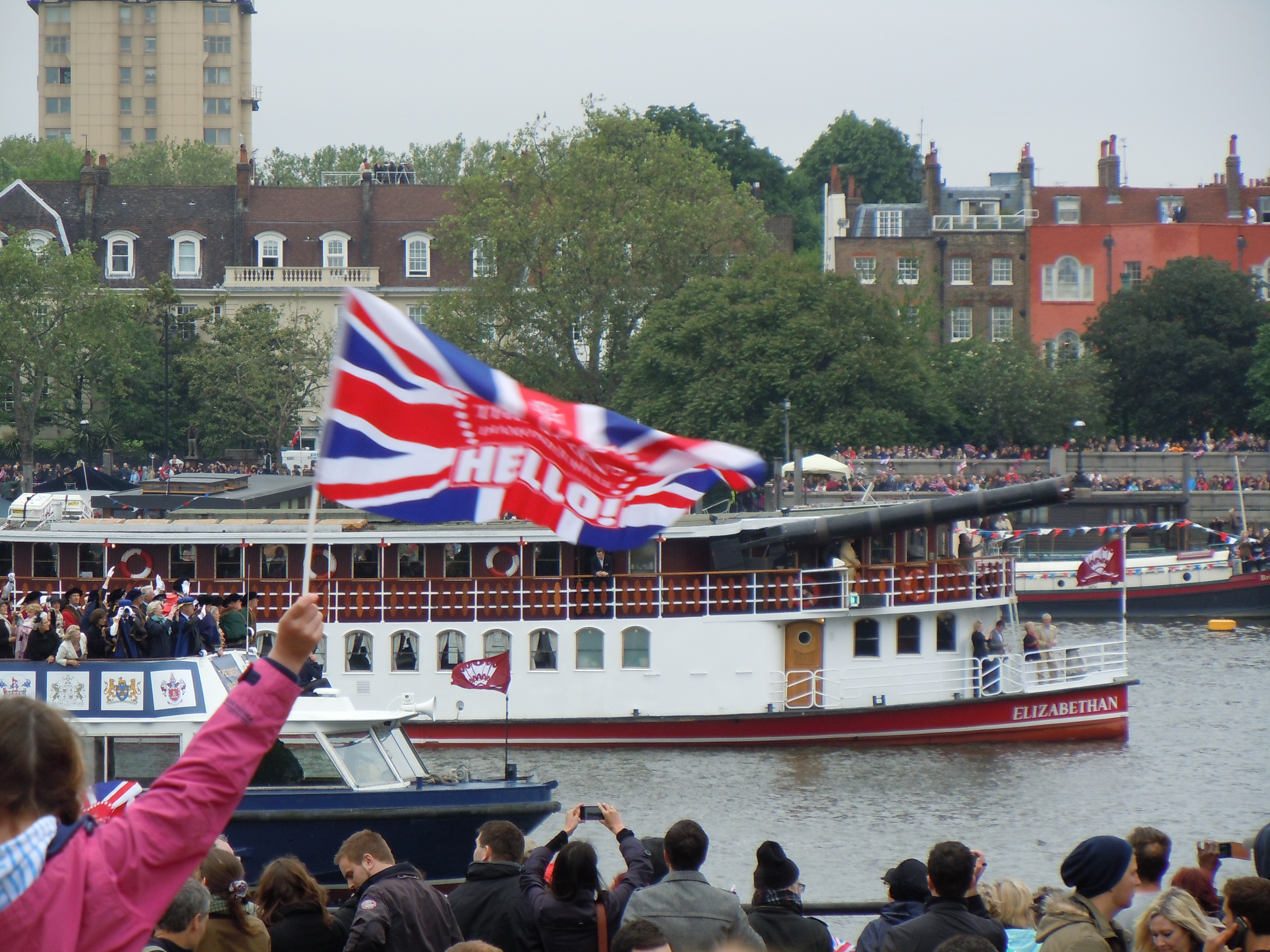
Queen Elizabeth II Thames Royal Pageant

- June 1: Four Serbs and two K-For soldiers have been injured in a clash in northern Kosovo during an attempt by peacekeepers to clear roadblocks.
- June 2: Over 700 people were detained after a group of anti-Nazi demonstrators have clashed with far-right activists in Hamburg, Germany.
- June 3: More than 1.5 million people celebrated the Diamond Jubilee of Queen Elizabeth II with a series of street parties and pageants in British capital.
- June 6: Severe windstorms, thunderstorms and hailstorms hit Romania. Several localities were flooded due to heavy rains in late-May and early-June. Roads were blocked due to landslides and rockfalls. At least five people were killed from the break out of violent storms.
- June 10
  - Local elections in Romania. Social Liberal Union won at least 49.71% of votes, dethroning the Democratic Liberal Party, that won only 14.8% of votes. Following the local elections, members of PDL resigned. Elections have resulted in conflicts between citizens and law enforcement.
  - A magnitude 6.0 earthquake struck the Dodecanese Islands (Greece), at a depth of 30 km. A big rock avalanche hit the city of Fethiye (Turkey). Several houses and minarets of mosques were damaged. At least 64 people were injured during the seism.
- June 20: Former Prime Minister of Romania, Adrian Năstase, tried to commit suicide after High Court of Cassation and Justice convicted him to a two-year imprisonment term for corruption charges.
- June 29: Turkey has begun deploying rocket launchers and anti-aircraft guns along its border with Syria after last week's downing of a Turkish military plane.

=== July ===
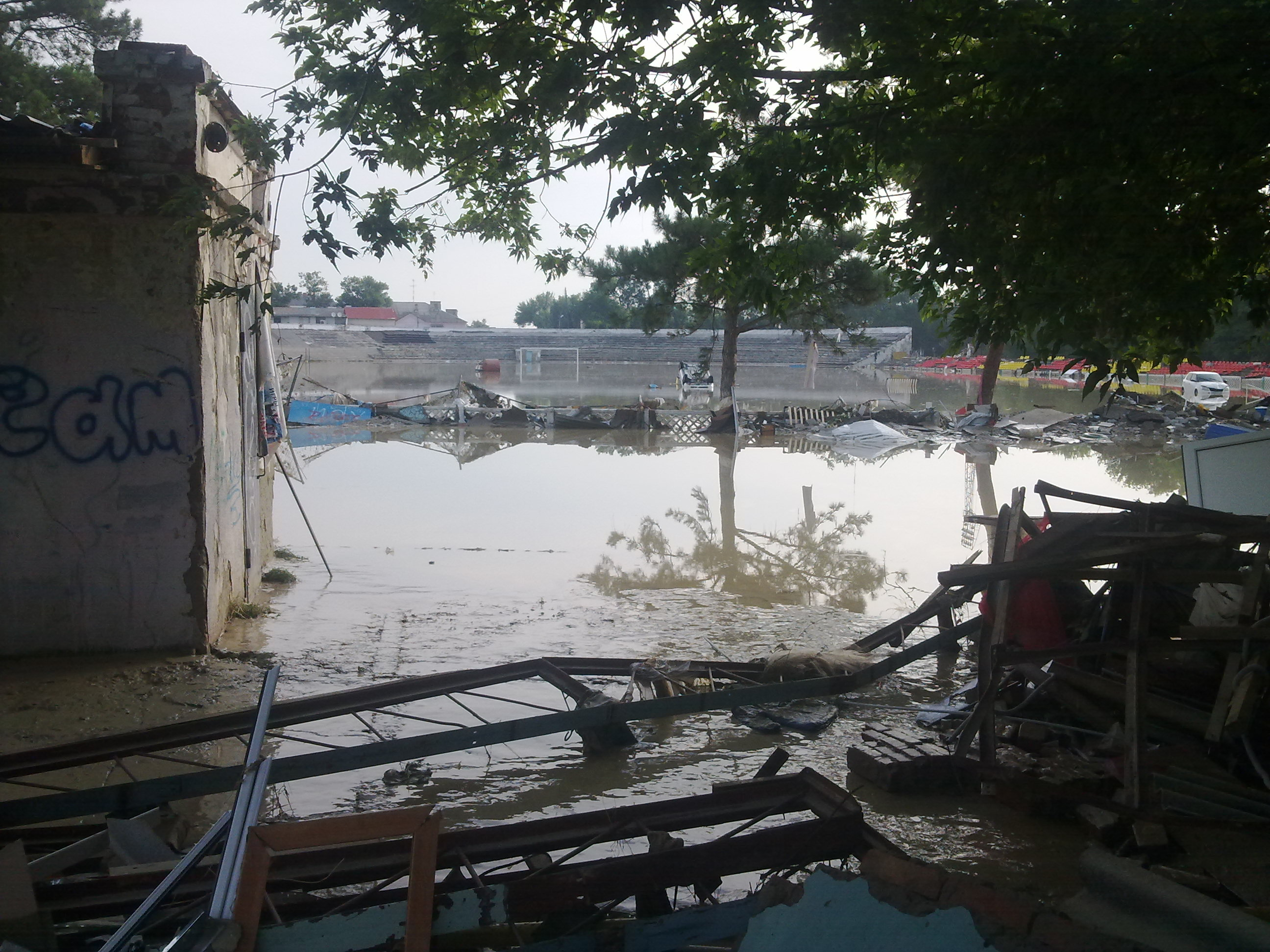
Flooding in Krasnodar Krai, Russia

- July 1: Cyprus assumed the Presidency of the Council of the European Union from Denmark.
- July 4: CERN announced the discovery of a new particle with properties consistent with the Higgs boson after experiments at the Large Hadron Collider.
- July 6: Romanian Parliament voted for President Băsescu's suspension amid allegations of violation of the Constitution and abuse of power. Decisive national referendum set for July 29.
- July 7: At least 14 Russian pilgrims have been killed in a bus crash in north-eastern Ukraine.
- July 8: Flash floods caused by torrential rain have swept the southern Russian Krasnodar region, killing 171 people.
- July 12: Nine climbers have been killed in an avalanche near the French Alpine ski resort of Chamonix.
- July 15: One person has been killed and at least 10 others injured during a series of freak tornadoes in northern and western Poland.
- July 18: An explosion has killed at least seven people on a bus carrying Israeli tourists in the eastern Bulgarian city of Burgas. More than 20 people were also injured when the bus exploded at Burgas airport, by the Black Sea.
- July 23: A series of violent wildfires burst out in Spain's north-eastern Catalonia region, killing three people. Strong winds gusting up to 90 km/h have rendered one fire "out of control", Catalonia's interior minister said. Fires of this ampleness were also reported in Portugal's southern Algarve region.

=== August ===
- August 9: 11 people have died and 39 were injured after the bus in which they were entered in a ditch in Ungheni District (Moldova).
- August 14
  - A fireworks explosion over a church bell tower set the sky ablaze and resulted in 28 injuries during a festival in eastern Spain.
  - Violent clashes between youths and police in the northern French city of Amiens left 17 police officers injured and several public buildings set on fire.
- August 20: At least eight people have been killed and 64 more wounded after a remote-controlled car bomb explodes in Turkish city of Gaziantep.
- August 21: The Constitutional Court of Romania decided to invalidate the results of the referendum for the impeachment of President Traian Băsescu. People met this decision with deprecation, thousands of people protesting against Traian Băsescu's reinstatement.
- August 23: A hot air balloon has crashed and caught fire in Slovenia, killing four people and injuring at least 28 others, including children.
- August 29: Three Georgian special forces personnel and 11 suspected militants have been killed in an army operation along the border with Russia.
- August 31: Armenia severs diplomatic relations with Hungary, following the extradition to Azerbaijan and subsequent pardoning of Ramil Safarov, who was convicted of killing an Armenian soldier in Hungary in 2004. The move is met with fierce criticism from the United States also.

=== September ===
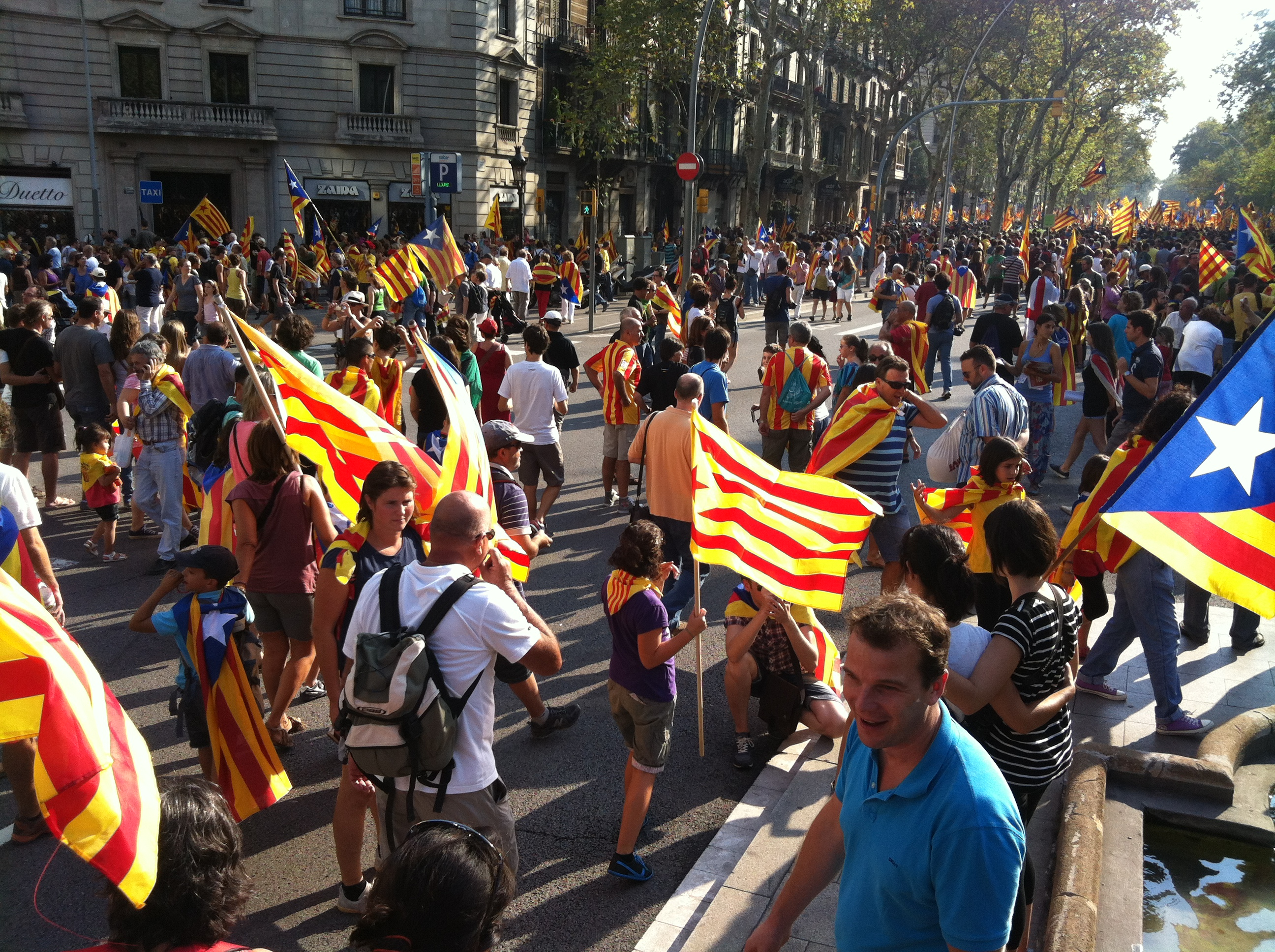
2012 Catalan independence protest

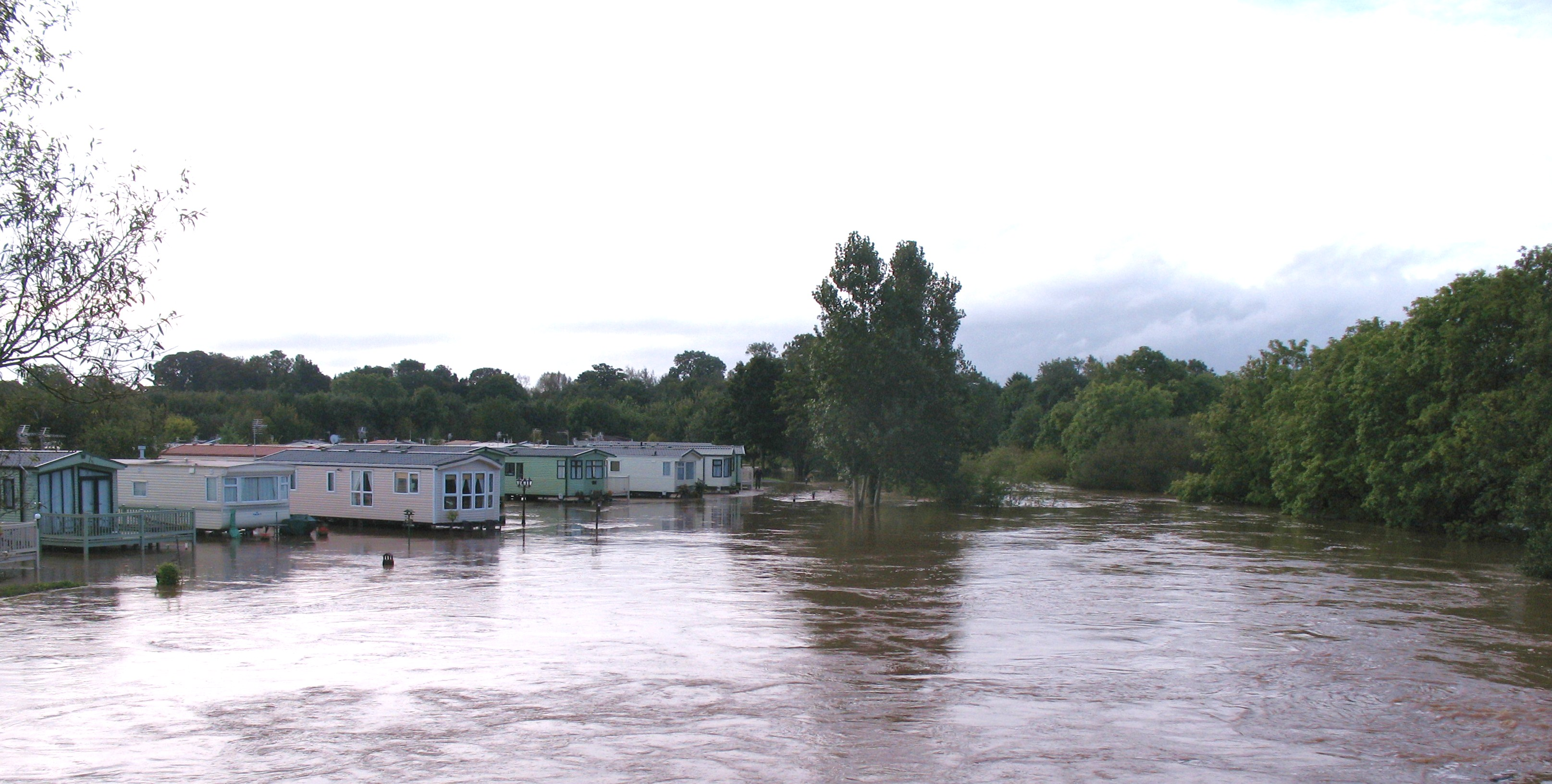
River Swale in flood at Topcliffe, North Yorkshire

- September 2
  - A baby has died and 42 people have been seriously injured after a bus of Romanian tourists crashed near Vidauban (France). Prime Minister Victor Ponta called, at the Government, a crisis cell composed of ministers of Interior, Foreign Affairs, Health and State Secretary Raed Arafat, as a result of this accident.
  - The ceiling of a bus station in Russian town of Belovo collapsed during repair work, killing at least one person and injuring 13.
  - A total of 16 whales have died after being stranded on the east coast of Scotland. Ten others were refloated after being kept alive by vets from British Divers and Marine Life Rescue.
  - Kurdish rebels armed with machine-guns and rocket launchers attacked a security complex in southeastern Turkey overnight, triggering fierce fighting that left about 30 people dead.
- September 5: An explosion at an ammunition store in Turkey has killed 25 soldiers and wounded four others.
- September 6: 61 people have died after a boat carrying migrants capsized off the coast of western Turkey.
- September 10: At least 80 police officers were injured after violence erupted during a Kurdish cultural festival in the southwest Germany city of Mannheim. More than 30 people were arrested.
- September 11
  - Three people were killed and 65 others were critically injured as a Polish bus crashes in the eastern French city of Mulhouse.
  - At least 35 people have been injured after two trams collided in The Hague.
  - An estimated 1.5 million people have been taking part in Catalonia's annual independence rally in Barcelona.
- September 12
  - 14 Vietnamese migrant workers were killed when a three-story building caught fire in the Russian town of Yegoryevsk. At least one person was hospitalized with injuries.
  - Ten people were killed when an An-28 passenger plane crashed in Russia's Kamchatka Peninsula. Regional authorities announced that another four people were seriously injured in the crash.
- September 14: At least four Russian tourists have died and 30 others were injured after their bus overturned in northern Greece.
- September 16
  - More than 10,000 people manifested on Chișinău streets on account of the reunification of Moldova and Romania. Moldovan Prime Minister, Vlad Filat, announced that he would prohibit any public manifestation regarding the reunification with Romania.
  - At least ten people, including a child, were killed when a minibus collided with a truck on a highway in the Stavropol region in southern Russia.
- September 17: The anti-American protests that have been ignited by the Innocence of Muslims provocative movie have spread to the European countries, including Belgium, Denmark, France and United Kingdom.
- September 18: More than 20 people died after drinking bootleg spirits tainted with methanol in the Czech region of Moravia. Czech police have charged 22 people in connection with the case.
- September 19: Two people were killed and four others were gravely wounded by a rabid bear in Southern Carpathians. The local authorities decreed state of alert in the area until its shooting or, eventually, until bears vaccination against rabies.
- September 29: At least ten people have died after heavy rains triggered flash floods in southern Spain.
- September 30: 35 people were reportedly injured after a tornado hit a fairground and flattened a ferris wheel in the Spanish region of Valencia.

=== October ===
- October 3: Turkish army launched an artillery strike on Syria in retaliation for a Syrian mortar attack, which killed at least 5. The NATO ambassadors called on Syria to immediately end its "aggressive acts" against Turkey after an emergency meeting in Brussels. Turkey also turned to the United Nations Security Council, writing a letter asking the highest UN decision-making body to stop Syria's aggression.
- October 12: The European Union has been awarded the Nobel Peace Prize for "the advancement of peace and reconciliation, democracy and human rights in Europe".
- October 14: Austrian skydiver Felix Baumgartner becomes the first person to break sound barrier without mechanical assistance during a record space dive out of the Red Bull Stratos helium-filled balloon from 39,045 kilometers over Roswell, New Mexico in the United States.
- October 22: Six scientists and a government official were sentenced to six years in prison for manslaughter by an Italian court for failing to give adequate warning of an earthquake that killed more than 300 people in L'Aquila in 2009.
- October 23: Some 150,000 people joined a march protest in the Hungarian capital of Budapest against Prime Minister Viktor Orbán.

=== November ===
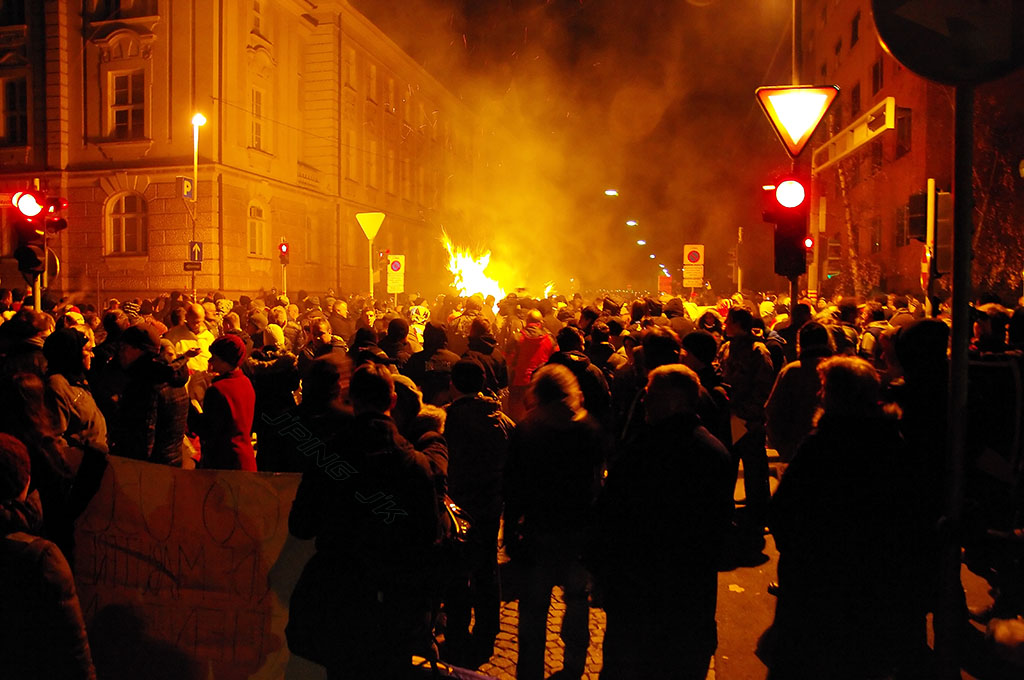
Violent protests on Maribor streets

- November 7: At least 100,000 angry Greek protesters clashed with riot police in front of the Hellenic Parliament, as far as lawmakers voted to approve a new austerity package needed to unlock vital aid and avert bankruptcy. More than 35 people were detained.
- November 9: An Algerian military cargo plane has crashed in southern France. All six people on board were reported dead.
- November 10: 17 soldiers have been killed in a helicopter crash in southeast Turkey.
- November 13
  - A passenger train has crashed into a railway repair trolley in a tunnel in northern Montenegro, killing two people and injuring 28 others.
  - At least four people were reported dead after severe floods hit northern and central Italy.
- November 14: Workers across the European Union have launched an unprecedented string of strikes in a co-ordinated battle against austerity cuts. The manifestations turned violent in Italian, Portuguese and Spanish capitals, where indignant protesters clashed with riot police.
- November 16: 13 people were injured and 12 people have been left homeless after an F3 tornado hit Algarve, Portugal.
- November 23: Three people died during a series of floods that affected many parts of Britain.
- November 25: At least six Romanian workers died after a train slammed into a vehicle in southern Italy.
- November 26: A fire broke out at a workshop for disabled people in southwestern Germany, killing 14 people and injuring at least six others.
- November 28: 22 people were injured after a freak tornado smashed into the Ilva steel plant in southern Italy.
- November 30: Protesters have clashed with riot police in Slovenia's capital Ljubljana during a rally against budget cuts and alleged corruption. During the clashes, 15 people were injured and 33 arrested.

=== December ===
- December 5: At least three people were killed and nine others were missing after a cargo ship with a Ukrainian and Russian crew sank in a storm off Istanbul's Black Sea coast.
- December 13: Five workers have been killed and nine others seriously injured in the collapse of a building that was under construction in the Russian city of Taganrog.
- December 17: President Traian Băsescu had designated Victor Ponta as Prime Minister of Romania, this being the single proposal from representatives of political parties and national minorities in Romania's Parliament.
- December 21: Mario Monti has resigned as Italian prime minister.
- December 22: More than 220 people have died in Russia and across Eastern Europe due to a cold snap.
- December 27: Six people in Poland have died after drinking alcohol tainted with methanol.
- December 28: Five people died intoxicated in a disused mine shaft in Baia Mare, Romania.
- December 29: A Russian passenger plane has crashed into a main road after overshooting a runway at Vnukovo International Airport, Moscow, killing at least five people.

== Arts and entertainment ==
- January 14: Milan Fashion Week
- January 18: Paris Fashion Week
- February 9–February 19: 62nd annual Berlin International Film Festival
- February 17: London Fashion Week
- May 16–May 27: 65th annual Cannes Film Festival
- May 26: Favourite Loreen has triumphed for Sweden at the 57th Eurovision Song Contest (held in Baku, Azerbaijan), with her club track "Euphoria".
- August 29–September 8: 69th annual Venice Film Festival
- September 22–October 7: The 179th edition of Oktoberfest was held in Munich, Germany.
- November 11: The 19th edition of MTV Europe Music Awards was held in Frankfurt, Germany.

== Sports ==
- January 29: Denmark won the 2012 European Men's Handball Championship, detaching from Serbia with only two goals.
- May 9: Athletic Bilbao won the 2012 UEFA Europa League Final, held at the National Arena in Bucharest.
- The Final Four of 2011-12 Euroleague was held at the Sinan Erdem Dome in Istanbul, in May 2012
- The final tournament of UEFA Euro 2012 has been hosted by Poland and Ukraine between June 8 and July 1, 2012.
- July 27: The 2012 Summer Olympics took place in London (United Kingdom).
- June 30–July 22: 2012 Tour de France
- The 2012 European Women's Handball Championship was held in Serbia from 3 to 16 December.
- 2012 European Grand Prix

== Architecture ==
- January 1: Ada Bridge, one of the tallest bridges in Europe, is completed and open to the public in Belgrade, Serbia.
- April 10: SeaCity Museum, located in Southampton, England, with extension by Wilkinson Eyre Architects, is officially opened.
- July 5: The Shard, the tallest building in the European Union and the tallest habitable free-standing structure in the UK at 309.6 metres (1,016 ft), is officially opened.
- July 18: Tate Modern (London) opens The Tanks performance art/installation space, refurbished by Herzog & de Meuron.
- July 25: The 75th floor of Mercury City Tower (Moscow) is completed. With the height of 332 m (1,089 ft), it becomes the tallest building on the European continent.
- September 21: Islamic art gallery at the Musée du Louvre in Paris, designed by Mario Bellini and Rudy Ricciotti, is opened.
- September 23: Renovation and new wing for Stedelijk Museum Amsterdam, designed by Benthem Crouwel Architekten, are opened to public.
- October 10: SkyTower, the tallest building in Romania, is completed. It dominates the Bucharest skyline with a total height of 137 m (449 ft).

== Births ==
- January 24: Princess Athena of Denmark.
- February 23: Princess Estelle of Sweden, Duchess of Östergötland.

== Deaths ==
=== January ===
- January 1: Kiro Gligorov, 94, first President of the Republic of Macedonia. (born 1917)
- January 3: Josef Škvorecký, 87, Czech writer and publisher. (born 1924)
- January 13: Rauf Denktaş, 87, Turkish Cypriot politician, barrister and jurist. (born 1924)
- January 15: Manuel Fraga Iribarne, 89, Spanish People's Party politician. (born 1922)
- January 20: Jiří Raška, 70, Czech skier. (born 1941)
- January 24: Theodoros Angelopoulos, 76, Greek filmmaker, screenwriter and film producer. (born 1935)
- January 25: Emil Hossu, 70, Romanian actor. (born 1941)
- January 29:
  - François Migault, 67, French racing driver. (born 1944)
  - Oscar Luigi Scalfaro, 93, 9th President of the Italian Republic. (born 1918)

=== February ===
- February 1: Wisława Szymborska, 88, Polish poet, essayist, translator and recipient of the 1996 Nobel Prize in Literature. (born 1923)
- February 3: Sam Youd, 89, British author. (born 1922)
- February 6: Antoni Tàpies, 88, Spanish artist. (born 1923)
- February 19: Renato Dulbecco, 97, Italian-born American virologist. (born 1914)
- February 25: Maurice Andre, 78, French trumpeter. (born 1933)
- February 29: Davy Jones, 66, English recording artist and actor. (born 1945)

=== March ===
- March 7: Wlodzimierz Smolarek, 54, Polish footballer. (born 1957)
- March 10: Jean Giraud, 73, French comics artist. (born 1938)
- March 14: Ċensu Tabone, 98, fourth President of Malta. (born 1913)
- March 16: Estanislau Basora, 85, Spanish footballer. (born 1926)
- March 17: John Demjanjuk, 91, Ukrainian convicted Nazi war criminal. (born 1920)
- March 21: Tonino Guerra, 92, Italian concentration camp survivor, poet, writer and screenwriter. (born 1920)
- March 25: Antonio Tabucchi, 68, Italian writer. (born 1943)
- March 28: Alexander Arutiunian, 91, Armenian composer and pianist. (born 1920)
- March 31: Ion Lucian, 87, Romanian actor and epigramist. (born 1924)

=== April ===
- April 1: Giorgio Chinaglia, 65, Italian footballer. (born 1947)
- April 14: Piermario Morosini, 25, Italian footballer. (born 1986)
- April 16: Mærsk Mc-Kinney Møller, 98, Danish shipping magnate. (born 1913)
- April 20: Valeri Vasiliev, 62, Russian ice hockey defenceman. (born 1949)
- April 30: Alexander Dale Oen, 26, Norwegian swimmer. (born 1985)

=== May ===
- May 9: Vidal Sassoon, 84, English hairdresser. (born 1928)
- May 18: Dietrich Fischer-Dieskau, 86, German lyric baritone and conductor of classical music. (born 1925)
- May 20: Robin Gibb, 62, British singer and songwriter, member of the Bee Gees. (born 1949)
- May 30: Andrew Huxley, 94, English physiologist and biophysicist, recipient of the 1963 Nobel Prize in Physiology or Medicine. (born 1917)

=== June ===
- June 3: Roy Salvadori, 90, British motor racing driver and manager. (born 1922)
- June 4: Eduard Khil, 77, Russian baritone singer. (born 1934)

=== July ===
- July 3: Sergio Pininfarina, 85, Italian automobile designer. (born 1926)
- July 14: Sixten Jernberg, 83, Swedish cross-country skier. (born 1929)
- July 16: Jon Lord, 71, English composer, pianist and Hammond organ player. (born 1941)
- July 27: Jack Taylor, 82, English football referee. (born 1930)
- July 30:
  - Maeve Binchy, 72, Irish author. (born 1940)
  - Chris Marker, 91, French writer and documentary filmmaker. (born 1921)

=== August ===
- August 2: Mihaela Ursuleasa, 33, Romanian concert pianist. (born 1978)
- August 6: Bernard Lovell, 98, English physicist and radio astronomer. (born 1913)
- August 14: Svetozar Gligorić, 89, Serbian chess grandmaster. (born 1923)
- August 19: Tony Scott, 68, British film director. (born 1944)
- August 20: Dom Mintoff, 96, 8th Prime Minister of Malta. (born 1916)
- August 31
  - Carlo Maria Martini, 85, Italian Jesuit and cardinal of the Catholic Church. (born 1927)
  - Sergey Leonidovich Sokolov, 101, Russian military commander and Minister of Defence of Soviet Union. (born 1911)

=== September ===
- September 8: Thomas Szasz, 92, Hungarian psychiatrist and academic. (born 1920)
- September 12: Sid Watkins, 84, English neurosurgeon. (born 1928)
- September 16: Princess Ragnhild, Mrs. Lorentzen, 82, Norwegian princess. (born 1930)
- September 18: Santiago Carrillo, 97, Spanish politician. (born 1915)
- September 23: Pavel Grachev, 64, Russian Army General and the Defence Minister of the Russian Federation. (born 1948)
- September 27: Herbert Lom, 95, Czech film and television actor. (born 1917)

=== October ===
- October 1: Eric Hobsbawm, 95, British Marxist historian. (born 1917)
- October 11: Helmut Haller, 73, German footballer. (born 1939)
- October 17: Sylvia Kristel, 60, Dutch actress. (born 1952)
- October 27: Hans Werner Henze, 86, German composer. (born 1926)

=== November ===
- November 6: Maxim of Bulgaria, 98, patriarch of the Bulgarian Orthodox Church. (born 1914)
- November 9: Iurie Darie, 83, Romanian actor. (born 1929)
- November 19: Boris Strugatsky, 79, Soviet-Russian science fiction writer. (born 1933)
- November 21: Șerban Ionescu, 62, Romanian actor. (born 1950)
- November 25
  - Dave Sexton, 82, English football manager and player. (born 1930)
  - Lars Hörmander, 81, Swedish mathematician. (born 1931)

=== December ===
- December 9: Patrick Moore, 89, English astronomer and broadcaster. (born 1923)
- December 11: Galina Vishnevskaya, 86, Russian soprano opera singer and recitalist. (born 1926)
- December 26: Gerry Anderson, 83, British television and film producer, director, writer. (born 1929)
- December 30: Rita Levi-Montalcini, 103, Italian neurologist and Nobel Prize laureate. (born 1909)

== Major religious holidays ==
- January 6: Baptism of Jesus, commonly known as Epiphany.
- February 1: Imbolc, a Cross-quarter day (celebrated on February 2 in some places).
- March 20: Spring equinox, also known as Ostara.
- April 15: Resurrection of Jesus, commonly known as Easter.
- May 1: Beltane, a Cross-quarter day.
- May 24: Ascension of Jesus.
- June 20: Summer solstice, also known as Midsummer.
- June 24: Nativity of St. John the Baptist.
- July 20 - August 18: Ramadan, the Islamic month of fasting (sawm).
- August 1: Lammas, a Cross-quarter day.
- August 15: Assumption of Mary, preceded by two weeks of feast.
- August 19: Eid ul-Fitr – Islam.
- September 8: Nativity of the Theotokos.
- September 21: Autumn equinox, also known as Mabon.
- October 26: Eid al-Adha, a religious festival in Islam.
- November 1: Samhain, a Cross-quarter day, Neopagan new year and Christian All Saints' Day.
- November 15: Islamic New Year.
- December 6: Holy Hierarch Nicholas, Bishop of Myra.
- December 25: Nativity of Jesus, commonly known as Christmas.

== See also ==
- 2012 in the European Union
- List of state leaders in 2012 § Europe
