= Stefan Cherkezov =

- Стефан Черкезов
- Born: 26 April 1937; Vinograd, Kingdom of Bulgaria
- Died: 16 August 1963 (aged 26); Gorna Oryahovitsa, People's Republic of Bulgaria
- Citizenship: Bulgaria
- Occupation: Medical doctor
- Known for: Rescuing 47 passengers from a burning bus

Stefan Cherkezov (Bulgarian: Стефан Черкезов) (26 April 1937 – 16 August 1963) was a Bulgarian medical doctor of Circassian origin. He belonged to the Circassian clan known as Tashu (Tӏэшъу). Cherkezov is known for his actions during a transport accident where he extracted passengers from a burning vehicle, saving the lives of 47 people but losing his own life.

== Biography ==
Cherkezov was born on 26 April 1937 in the village of Vinograd, Strazhitsa Municipality; his ancestors were exiled from Circassia after the Russo-Circassian War. He began working as a district doctor in the village of Strelets on 1 January 1963. He was married to Lidiya and had one daughter who also became a medical doctor.

On 15 August 1963, a collision occurred between a bus and a truck on the road between Veliko Tarnovo and Gorna Oryahovitsa. Cherkezov was a passenger on the bus, which caught fire following the impact. After exiting the vehicle, he returned to the burning bus to extract 47 other passengers. He sustained severe burns during the rescue and died the following day. His wife later quoted him stating that the resources his father invested in his medical education were not in vain.

== Legacy ==
In 2005, the Bulgarian government officially declared 15 August as the "Day of Salvation" (Bulgarian: Ден на спасението). The day honors medical professionals and other citizens who have died in the line of duty.

Several locations and institutions are named in his honor. These include the Multi-profile Hospital for Active Treatment in Veliko Tarnovo, the street in Vinograd where his birth house is located, and the village health service center, which also features a memorial plaque on its facade. A street in the Lyulin district of Sofia is also named after Stefan Cherkezov (Map).
