= Vinograd, Bulgaria =

Vinograd Виноград
- Village
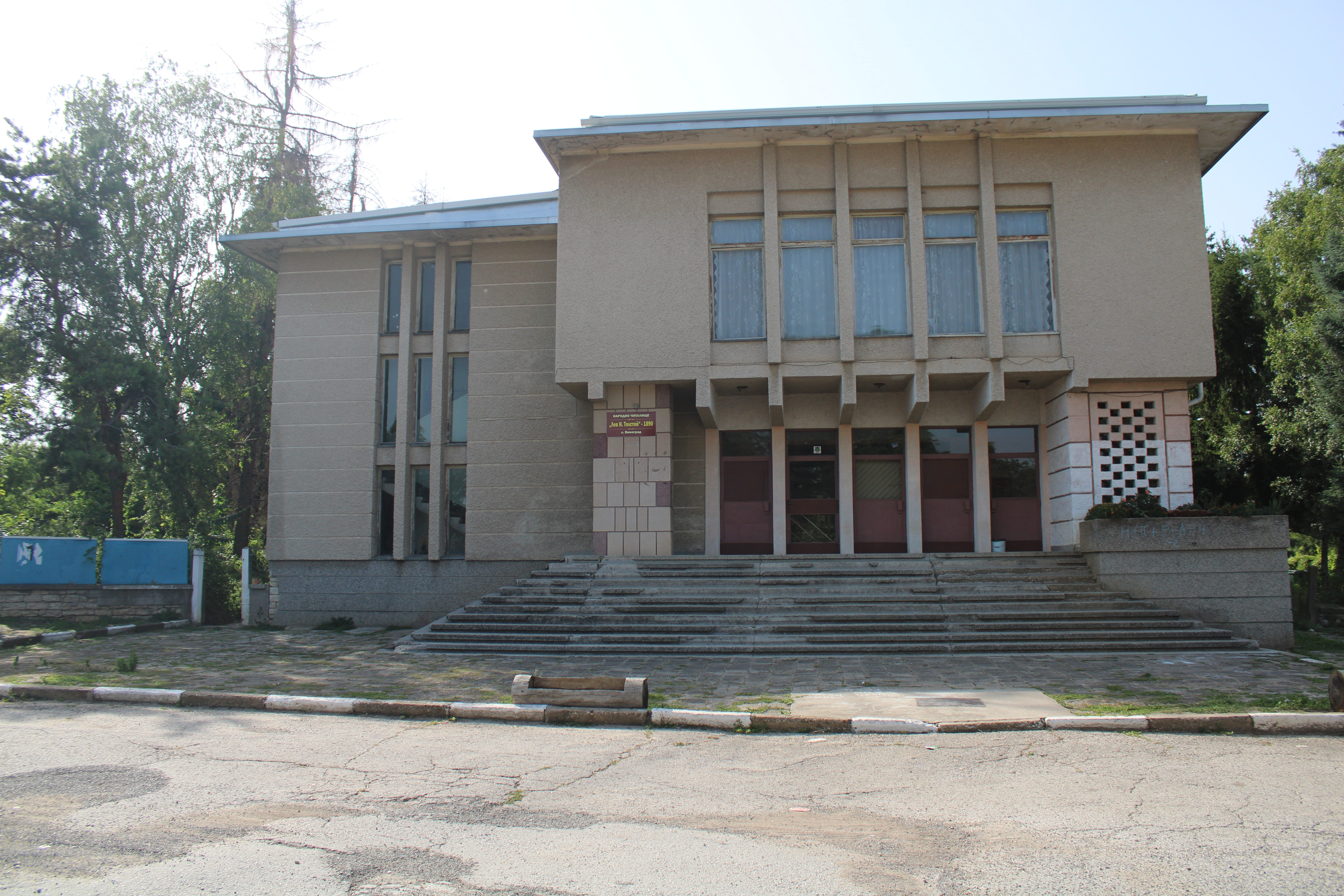
- Chitalishte Leo Tolstoy

- Location within Bulgaria
- Coordinates: 43.333°N 25.833°E
- Country: Bulgaria
- Oblast: Veliko Tarnovo
- Opština: Strazhitsa

Government
  - Mayor (Municipality): Jordan Tsonev (New Bulgaria)
  - Mayor (Town Hall): Asen Marinov (BSP)

Area
  - Total: 29.469 km^{2} (11.378 sq mi)
- Elevation: 271 m (889 ft)

Population (2024)
  - Total: 731
  - Density: 24.8/km^{2} (64.2/sq mi)
- Postal code: 5171
- Area code: 06166
- Vehicle registration: ВТ

Vinograd (Bulgarian: Виноград [vinoˈɡrat]) is a village in Strazhitsa Municipality, Veliko Tarnovo Province, Bulgaria. As of 2024 it has a population of 731.

== Geography ==
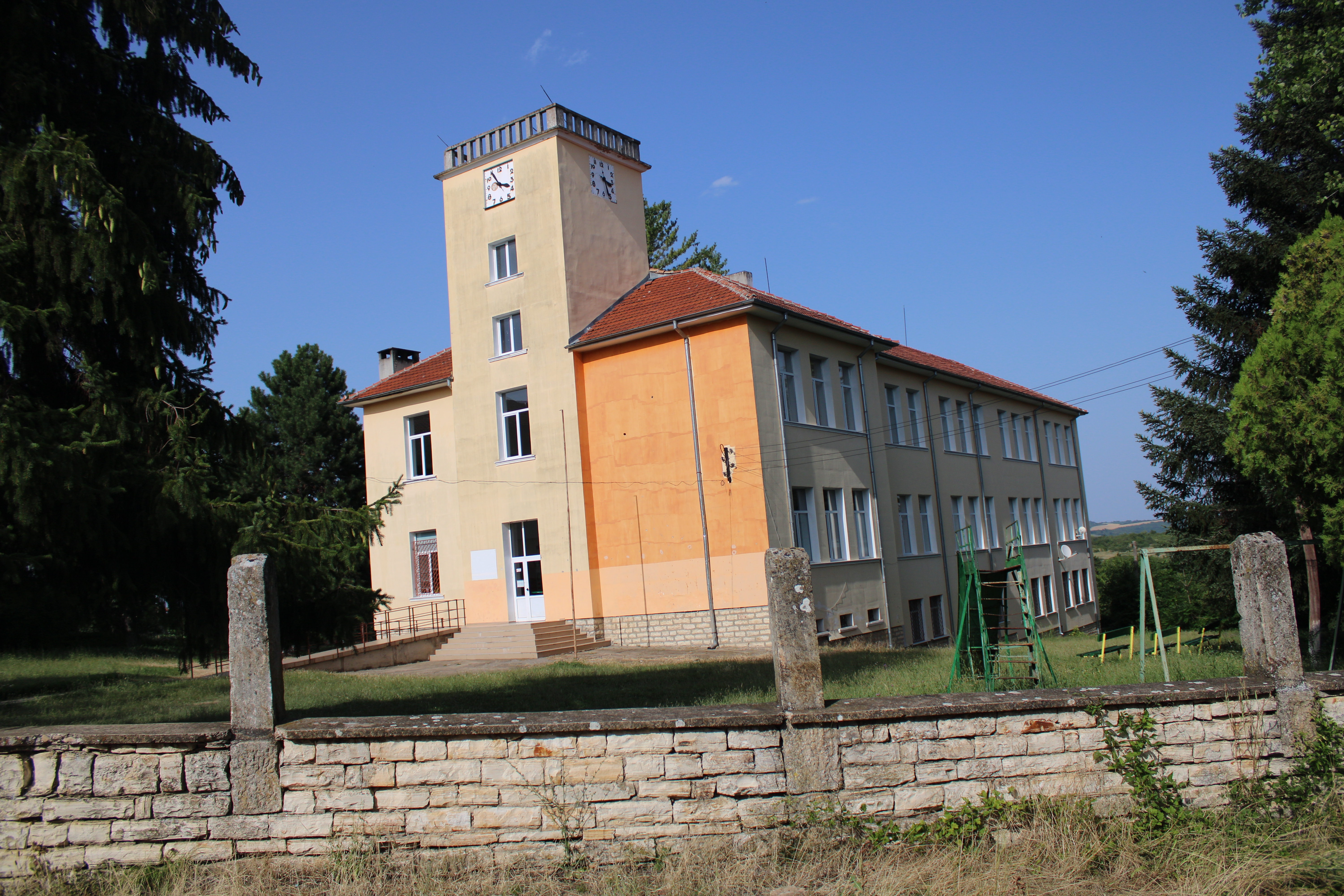
The school in Vinograd

The village is situated at an altitude of 279 m in the eastern part of the Danubian Plain near Koyadzhik, a tributary of the river Baniski Lom of the Rusenski Lom basin. Vinograd lies along a watershed depression, which diverts rainwater to a small reservoir some 150 m northeast of the village. It falls within the temperate continental climatic zone. The soils are alluvial and grey forest.

Administratively, it is part of the Strazhitsa Municipality, situated in the eastern part of Veliko Tarnovo Province. It has a territory of 29.469 km^{2}. Vinograd lies some 16 km northwest of the municipal center Strazhitsa, 16 km east of the town of Polski Trambesh, and 34 km northeast of the regional center of Veliko Tarnovo. It is served by the third class III-407 road, which in western direction leads to Polski Trambesh past the villages of Orlovets and Karantsi, and in eastern directed leads to Strazhitsa through the villages of Lozen, Gorski Senovets and Tsarski Izvor.

== History and culture ==
The villages was first documented in the 18th century. At the outbreak of the First Balkan War in 1912, two people from Vinograd volunteered in the Macedonian-Adrianopolitan Volunteer Corps.

The Church of the Nativity of the Blessed Virgin Mary was constructed in 1882. The school was established in 1879. The local cultural center, known in Bulgarian as a chitalishte, was established in 1890 and was named after the Russian writer Leo Tolstoy. The current edifice was constructed in 1967.

== Economy ==
Vinograd lies in a fertile area and has a well-developed agriculture. The main crops include many wheat, cereals, sunflower, sugar beet and vegetables. Livestock breeding is also well-developed with extensive farms for cattle and pigs.

== Notable people ==
- Stefan Cherkezov (26 April 1937 – 16 August 1963)
