= 2014 Aegean Sea earthquake =

6.9 magnitude earthquake centered in the Aegean Sea

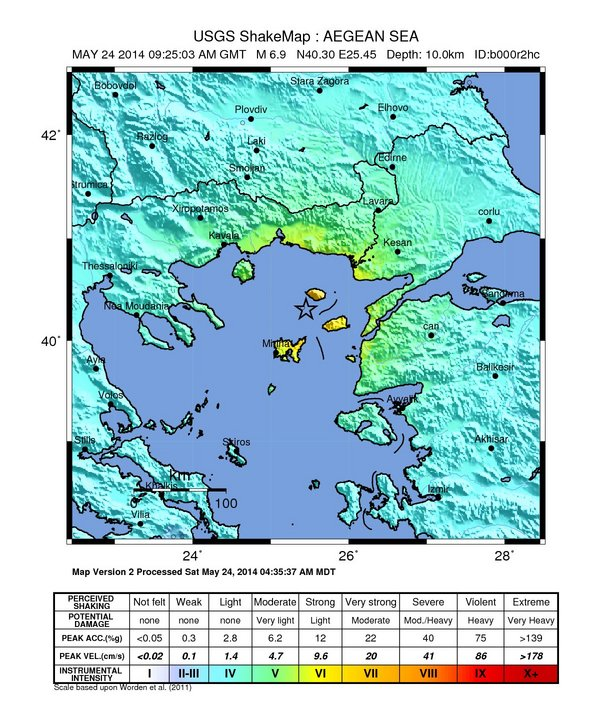

- Location within Greece
- UTC time: 2014-05-24 09:25:02
- ISC event: 610416360
- USGS-ANSS: ComCat
- Local date: May 24, 2014
- Local time: 12:25:02 FET
- Magnitude: 6.9 M_{w}
- Depth: 6.4 km (4 mi)
- Epicenter: 40.289°N 25.389°E
- Type: Strike-slip
- Areas affected: Greece; Turkey; Bulgaria
- Total damage: $450 million
- Max. intensity: MMI IX (Violent)
- Tsunami: No
- Casualties: 3 dead, 324 injured

An earthquake occurred in the northern Aegean Sea between Greece and Turkey on May 24, 2014. It had a moment magnitude of 6.9 and a maximum Mercalli intensity of IX (Violent). Serious damage was reported on the Turkish island of Imbros and the cities of Edirne and Çanakkale, as well as on the Greek island of Lemnos. The earthquake was felt in Bulgaria and southern Romania. Several aftershocks followed the main shock, the strongest measuring 5.3 M_{L}. This aftershock struck the Gulf of Saros at 12:31 local time.

== Tectonic setting ==
The northern part of the Aegean Sea shows a transition from the strike-slip tectonics associated with the North Anatolian Fault (NAF) to the extensional tectonics that characterise the area north of the Hellenic arc. The location of this earthquake is on the westward continuation of the NAF on the boundary between the Anatolian plate and the Eurasian plate. Other earthquakes on this part of the NAF include an M6.6 event in 1975 and an M5.7 event in 2003.

== Earthquake ==
The distribution of aftershocks, combined with the observed focal mechanism, indicate dextral (right lateral) strike-slip on a WSW-ENE striking fault, assumed to be a continuation of the NAF. Analysis by backprojection of strong motion waveforms has been used to understand the detailed propagation history of the earthquake rupture. Two separate fault segments have been identified using this method. The shorter segment to the west of the hypocenter ruptured first followed by rupture to the east along the 65 km segment. Propagation of the longer eastern segment occurred at speeds well in excess of the S wave velocity, making this an example of a supershear earthquake.

== Damage and casualties ==
A British tourist was injured in Lemnos, Greece. A shelter at the Lemnos International Airport collapsed. Many abandoned houses and a church were also damaged. Almost three hundred houses were damaged in Turkey and 11 houses collapsed in Greece.

Doğan News Agency said the tremor caused damage to some old houses on the island of Imbros, off Turkey's northern Aegean coast, and 30 people were taken to a hospital with minor injuries. Early reports talked about a heart attack in the greater earthquake area, but the death has not been confirmed. The Governor of Çanakkale reported a total number of 324 injuries, and three deaths. Two churches and 13 mosques were damaged to various extents. Minor damage was also inflicted in Bulgaria.

== See also ==
- List of earthquakes in 2014
- List of earthquakes in Bulgaria
- List of earthquakes in Greece
- List of earthquakes in Turkey
- 2017 Aegean Sea earthquake
- 2020 Aegean Sea earthquake
