= 1986 Strazhitsa earthquake =

Earthquake in Bulgaria

- Location within Bulgaria
- UTC time: 1986-12-07 14:17:09
- ISC event: 478085
- USGS-ANSS: ComCat
- Local date: 7 December 1986
- Local time: 16:17 EET
- Magnitude: M_{w} 5.6
- Depth: 10.0 km (6.2 mi)
- Epicenter: 43.251°N 25.962°E
- Areas affected: Bulgaria
- Max. intensity: MMI VII (Very strong)
- Casualties: 3 dead, 60 injured

The 1986 Strazhitsa earthquake affected northeastern Bulgaria on 7 December at 16:17 EET. The earthquake had an epicenter 6 km (3.7 mi) northwest of Strazhitsa in Veliko Tarnovo Province. It measured M_{w} 5.6 and occurred at a depth of 10 km (6.2 mi). The earthquake caused extensive damage in the Veliko Turnovo and Turgovishte area, killed 3 people, and injured 60. Shaking from the earthquake was also felt in parts of Romania, Turkey and Yugoslavia.

== Earthquake ==
The earthquake struck on 7 December at 16:17 EET with an epicenter in Veliko Turnovo Province, about 235 km (146 mi) east of Sofia. It was the second significant earthquake to strike the province in 1986; the previous event measured M_{L} 5.5 and occurred on 21 February. Both earthquakes occurred within the Gorna Oryahovitsa seismic zone, a geologically active region that extends 100 km (62 mi) from east to west and is 75 km (47 mi) wide. This area produces shallow earthquakes and have the potential to generate earthquakes of magnitude 7.0. The largest earthquake in this zone occurred in 1913, measuring 7.0. These earthquake were caused by rupture at the intersection of two nearly east–west striking and a north-northwest–south-southeast striking faults. One of these east–west trending fault was identified as the Pre-Balkan Fault. They involved vertical (dip-slip) movement on these faults. The February earthquake was caused by movement on the north-northwest–south-southeast trending strand while the December earthquake ruptured the Pre-Balkan Fault.

== Impact ==
The earthquake killed at least 3, injured 60, and left more than 3,000 people homeless. According to state-run Bulgarian News Agency, over 80 percent of the infrastructure in Strazhitsa and other nearby villages were flattened or heavily damage. Tanjug said that many schools, kindergarten, a hospital and polyclinic were also badly damaged. In Veliko Tarnovo and Targovishte provinces, an unspecified number of homes, government buildings and other infrastructure were damaged. The shock also knocked out power, communication and water services; in both provinces, 79 settlements were affected by these disruptions. In response, 30 trucks from nearby regions supplied these areas with water. Deputy health minister Lyubomir Shindarov and some physicians assisted in ensuring those affected had food. Vacation homes and public infrastructure were used to housed the displaced. Shaking from the earthquake was also felt in parts of Romania, Turkey and Yugoslavia.
