= Strazhitsa Municipality =

Strazhitsa Municipality Община Стражица
- Municipality
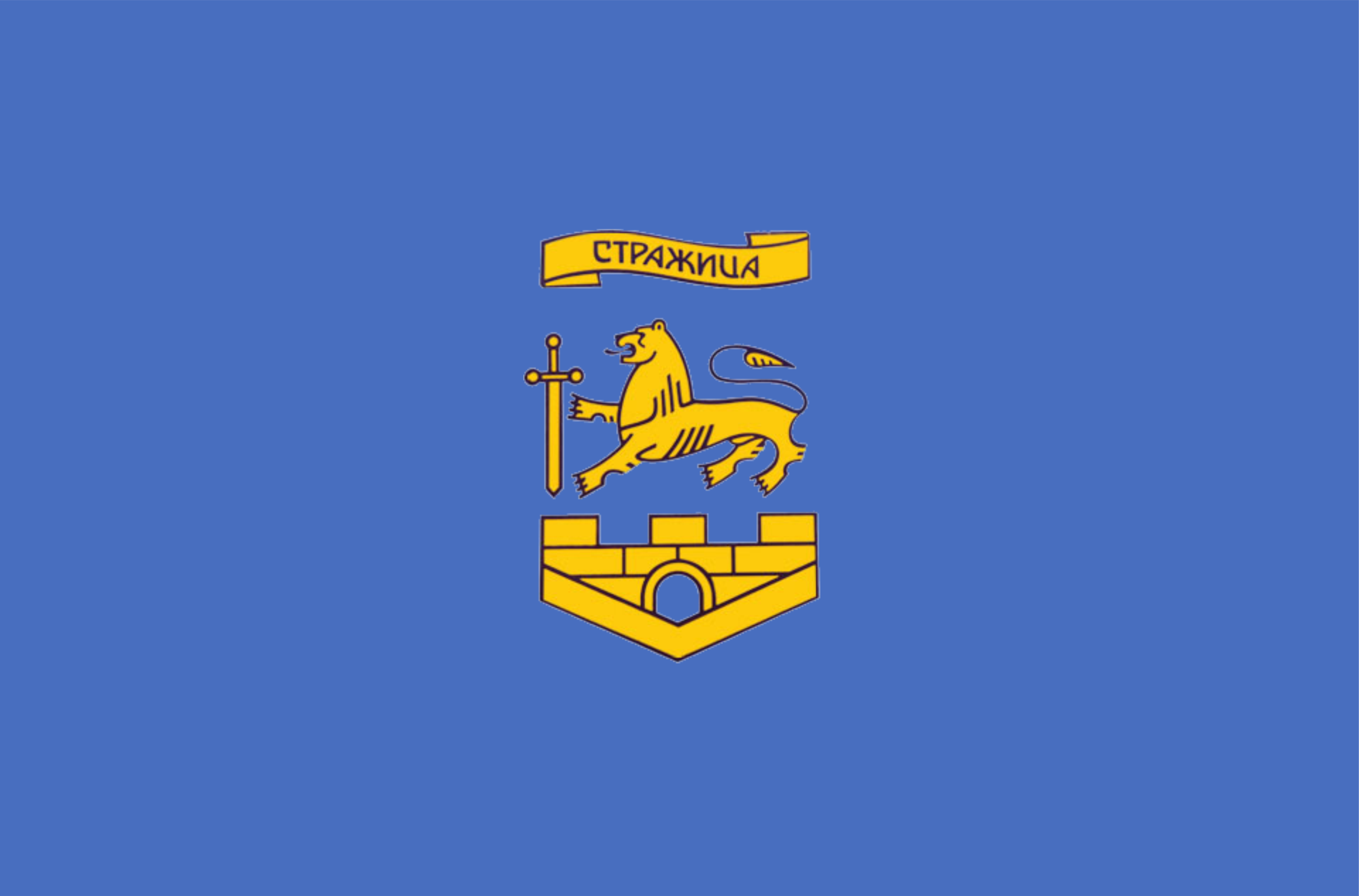
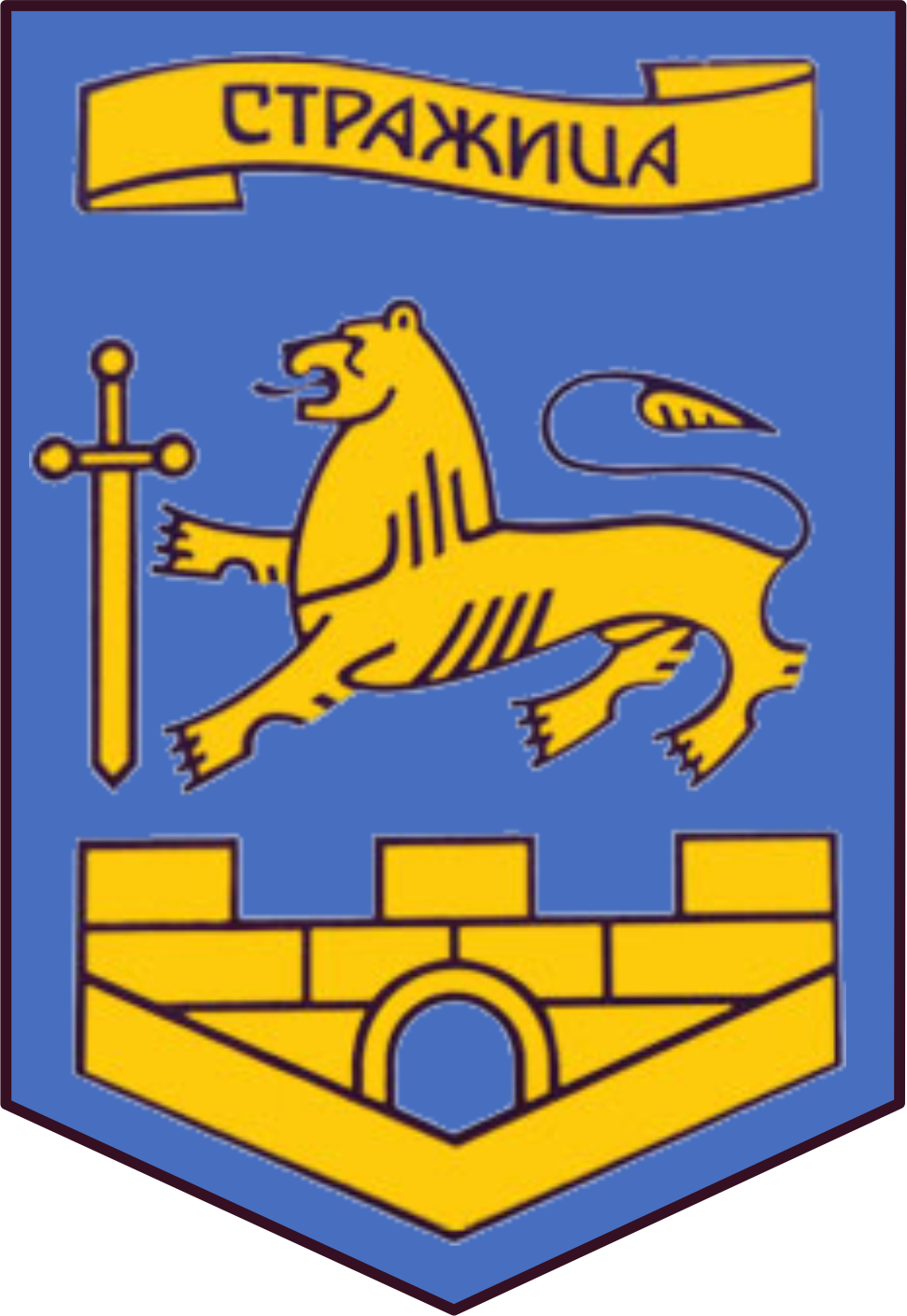
- Flag Coat of arms

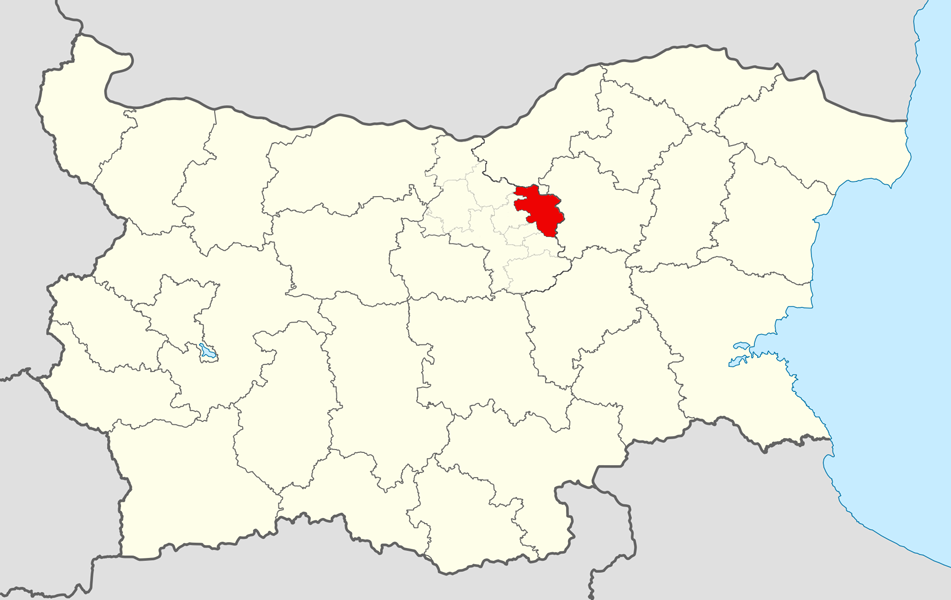
- Strazhitsa Municipality within Bulgaria and Veliko Tarnovo Province.
- Coordinates: 43°15′N 25°58′E
- Country: Bulgaria
- Province (Oblast): Veliko Tarnovo
- Admin. centre (Obshtinski tsentar): Strazhitsa

Area
  - Total: 512 km^{2} (198 sq mi)

Population (December 2009)
  - Total: 14,742
  - Density: 28.8/km^{2} (74.6/sq mi)
- Time zone: UTC+2 (EET)
  - Summer (DST): UTC+3 (EEST)

Strazhitsa Municipality (Bulgarian: Община Стражица [opʃtiˈna ˈstraʒit͡sɐ]) is a municipality (obshtina) in Veliko Tarnovo Province, north-central Bulgaria, located mostly in the Danubian Plain but also covering parts of the so-called Fore-Balkan. It is named after its administrative centre – the town of Strazhitsa.

The municipality has an area of 512 km^{2} (198 sq mi) and a population of 14,742 inhabitants, as of December 2009.

The Hemus motorway is planned to cross the area, connecting the capital city of Sofia with the port of Varna on the Bulgarian Black Sea Coast.

== Settlements ==
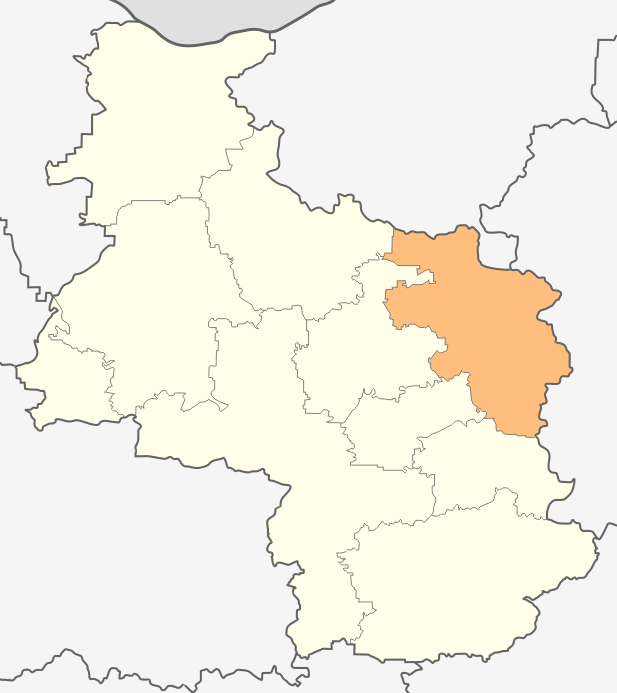
Strazhitsa Municipality within Veliko Tarnovo Province

Strazhitsa Municipality includes the following 22 places (towns are shown in bold):

Town/Village	Cyrillic	Population (December 2009)
**Strazhitsa**	**Стражица**	5,170
Asenovo	Асеново	705
Balkantsi	Балканци	159
Blagoevo	Благоево	449
Bryagovitsa	Бряговица	500
Gorski Senovets	Горски Сеновец	358
Kavlak	Кавлак	79
Kamen	Камен	1,651
Kesarevo	Кесарево	1,608
Lozen	Лозен	456
Lyubentsi	Любенци	8
Mirovo	Мирово	178
Nikolaevo	Николаево	125
Nova Varbovka	Нова Върбовка	319
Novo Gradishte	Ново градище	145
Sushitsa	Сушица	866
Temenuga	Теменуга	30
Tsarski Izvor	Царски извор	821
Vinograd	Виноград	773
Vladislav	Владислав	295
Vodno	Водно	11
Zhelezartsi	Железарци	36
Total		14,742

== Demography ==
The following table shows the change of the population during the last four decades.

Strazhitsa Municipality
Year	1975	1985	1992	2001	2005	2007	2009	2011
Population	23,750	20,542	18,534	16,504	15,723	15,214	14,742	...
Sources: Census 2001, Census 2011, „pop-stat.mashke.org“,

== See also ==
- Provinces of Bulgaria
- Municipalities of Bulgaria
- List of cities and towns in Bulgaria
