= 2012 Pernik earthquake =

Earthquake in Bulgaria

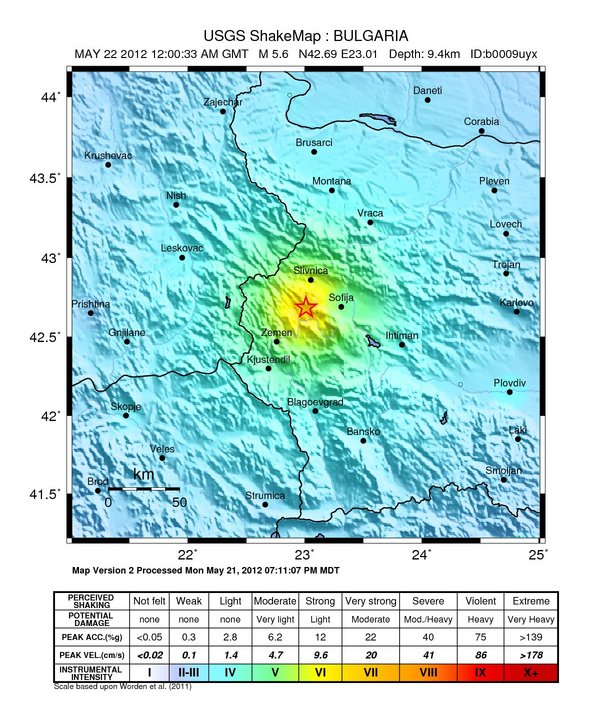
- USGS shakemap for the event

- Location within Bulgaria
- UTC time: 2012-05-22 00:00:32
- ISC event: 601031496
- USGS-ANSS: ComCat
- Local date: 22 May 2012
- Local time: 03:00:32 EEST
- Magnitude: 5.6 M_{w}
- Depth: 10.0 km (6.2 mi)
- Epicenter: 42.65°N 22.97°E
- Type: Dip-slip
- Areas affected: Pernik Province, Bulgaria
- Max. intensity: MMI VII (Very strong)
- Casualties: 1 (indirect)

The 2012 Pernik earthquake was a 5.6 M_{w} magnitude earthquake, which struck 24 km (15 miles) west of Bulgaria's capital Sofia and 9 km (6 miles) north-northwest of the provincial center Pernik on 22 May 2012 at 3:00 am local time (00:00 UTC) at a depth of 9.4 kilometers (5.8 mi).

== Impact ==
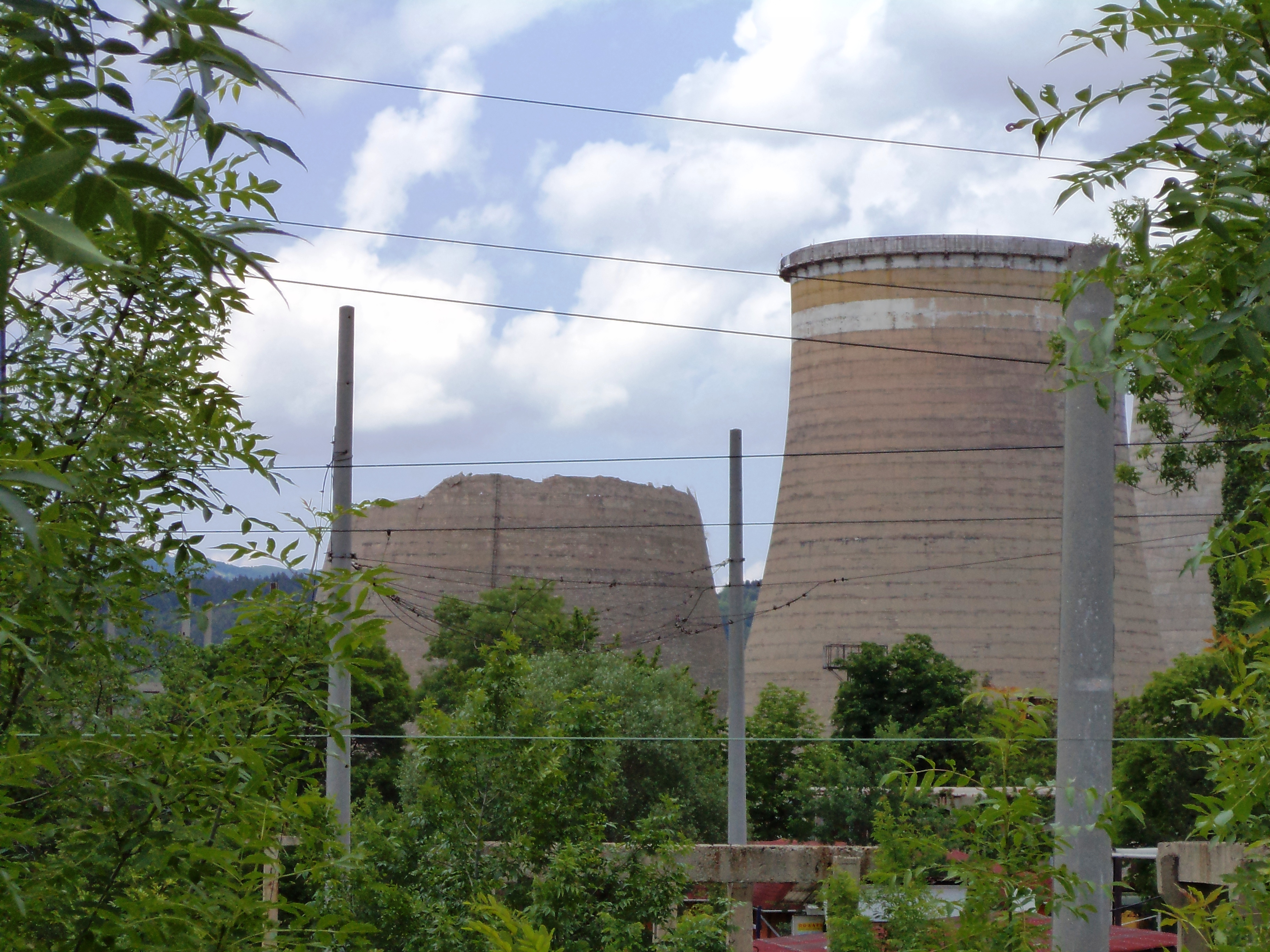
One of the three towers of the "Republika" Thermal Power Station in Pernik was heavily damaged

An emergency was declared in Pernik in the immediate aftermath of the earthquake. Mayors from nearby villages reported no significant damage. Many residents in Sofia were reported to have fled their homes and gathered in the streets. Xinhua journalists in the capital reported that Internet connectivity had been cut off.

According to the civil defense office, there were widespread reports of toppled chimneys, cracked walls and broken windows in the Pernik area, where a state of emergency was declared for 24 hours. One of the three cooling towers of the city's Republika Power Plant partially collapsed during the tremor, and as a result the capacity has been temporarily reduced.

=== Casualties ===
A 59-year-old woman from Kyustendil had a heart attack and was listed as the only indirect casualty.

== Aftermath ==
The Bulgarian government initially sent 14 teams to the area to assess the damage, and their first reports concluded that around 60% of all homes have been affected. At least 150 people have been relocated to temporary shelters, and several schools and kindergartens in the area would have to be demolished or rebuilt. A total of 14,000 buildings were eventually inspected, and approximately 50 of them will be torn down. Initial estimates put the damage costs in the capital Sofia at around 1.3 million leva (around 660,000 euro), while the city of Pernik suffered at least 20 million leva (around 10.2 million euro).

== See also ==
- List of earthquakes in 2012
- List of earthquakes in Bulgaria
