= Strazhitsa =

Strazhitsa Стражица
- Location of Strazhitsa
- Coordinates: 43°14′N 25°58′E
- Country: Bulgaria
- Provinces (oblast): Veliko Tarnovo

Government
  - Mayor: Yordan Tsonev

Population (March 2024)
  - Total: 5,069
- Time zone: UTC+2 (EET)
  - Summer (DST): UTC+3 (EEST)
- Postal Code: 5150
- Area code: 06161

Strazhitsa (Bulgarian: Стражица, romanized: Stražica, pronounced [ˈstraʒit͡sɐ]) is a town in northeastern Bulgaria, part of Veliko Tarnovo Province. It is the administrative centre of the homonymous Strazhitsa Municipality, which lies in the eastern part of the Province. The town is located in the central Danubian Plain, not far from the Balkan Mountains, 45 kilometres northeast of the provincial capital of Veliko Tarnovo. As of March 2024, it had a population of 5,069.

Strazhitsa has a railway station on the Sofia-Varna railway line, located some 33 km from the railway station of Popovo and some 27 km from the railway station of Gorna Oryahovitsa.

The town was badly damaged by an earthquake on 7 December 1986. Strazhitsa has an art gallery, an Eastern Orthodox church dedicated to the Dormition of the Mother of God, as well as a museum of local history. Strazhitsa's name comes from the Bulgarian root strazh (страж), meaning "guard".

== Municipality ==
Strazhitsa municipality covers an area of 512 square kilometres (198 sq mi) and includes the following 22 places:

- Asenovo
- Balkantsi
- Blagoevo
- Bryagovitsa
- Gorski Senovets
- Kamen
- Kavlak
- Kesarevo
- Lozen
- Lyubentsi
- Mirovo
- Nikolaevo
- Novo Gradishte
- Nova Varbovka
- Strazhitsa
- Sushitsa
- Temenuga
- Tsarski Izvor
- Vinograd
- Vladislav
- Vodno
- Zhelezartsi
