= Republika Power Plant =

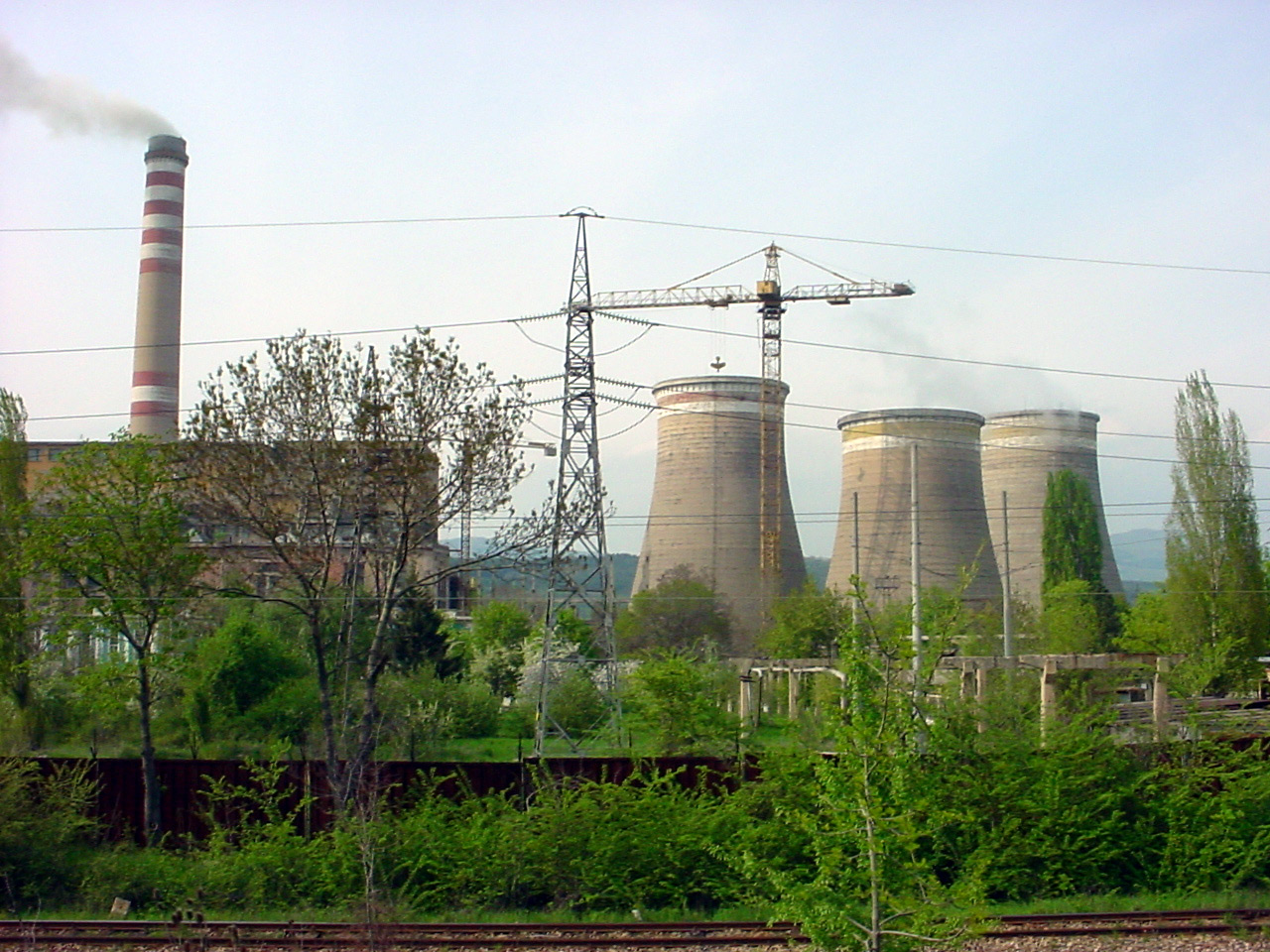
- Republika TPP
- Country: Bulgaria
- Location: Pernik
- Coordinates: 42°36′23″N 23°4′45″E
- Status: Operational
- Commission date: 1951
- Cogeneration?: Yes

Power generation
- Nameplate capacity: 180 MW

External links
- Commons: Related media on Commons

Republika Power Plant (Bulgarian: ТЕЦ Република) is a power plant situated near the city of Pernik, western Bulgaria. It has an installed capacity of 180 MW. There is a €6,500,000 reconstruction plan undergoing for the fifth generator. The plant suffered damage during the 2012 Pernik earthquake, with one of its cooling towers partially collapsing, leading to a reduced capacity. The tower was later demolished, as evidenced by Google Maps satellite images.

== See also ==
- Energy in Bulgaria
