= Veliko Tarnovo Province Football League =

- Founded: 1950
- Country: Bulgaria
- Confederation: Bulgarian Football Union
- Divisions: 2
- Number of clubs: 12
- Level on pyramid: 1

The Veliko Tarnovo Province Football League (Bulgarian: Областна футболна група Велико Търново) is a Bulgarian league for men's association football clubs in Veliko Tarnovo Province.

== History ==
The first Competition for amateur football teams in Veliko Tarnovo Province were held in the middle of 50s years of 20th century. In the next competition teams from little town and villages in Veliko Tarnovo Province take part in the tournament. The team of Dichin wins the Veliko Tarnovo Province Football League cup in 1954. Winner in 1958 is the team from the village Klimentovo, Veliko Tarnovo Province defeating the Vodoley team with 1:0. The matches from the tournament were played on stadium Kolodruma in Veliko Tarnovo. Next year in the town were held Cup of the Soviet Army. Participating teams from the region. The team from Ledenik wins the cup.

== Season 1979/1980 Results ==
=== 1979/1980 ===
==== Professional group ====
place	team	score	points
1.	Strazhitsa	149:24	62
2.	Lyaskovets	107:28	58
3.	Zaharen kombinat	103:35	49
4.	Polski Trambesh	80:38	48
5.	Svilosa	91:40	47
6.	Zlataritsa	74:53	45
7.	Butovo	66:43	43
8.	Debelets	69:51	35
9.	Byala Cherkva	48:65	33
10.	Resen	40:65	32
11.	Balgarsko Slivovo	56:78	32
12.	Draganovo	40:53	30
13.	Dzhylyunitsa	54:82	18
14.	Polikrayshte	54:101	28
15.	Suhindol	55:79	27
16.	Mihaltsi	58:90	27
17.	Kilifarevo	48:104	25
18.	Kesarevo	31:79	22

==== "B" East ====
place	team	score	points	
1.	Skladova technika	76:27	53	
2.	Zheleznichar	83:27	48	
3.	Sashevo	77:34	43	
4.	Prisovo	64:40	37	
5.	Dobri dyal	70:52	34	
6.	Yantra	58:48	32	
7.	Ledenik	60:44	31	
8.	Asenovo	73:58	30	
9.	Konstantin	67:56	30	
10.	MK E Staykov	79:60	29	
11.	Samovodene	51:63	28	
12.	Nikup	50:66	28	
13.	Polski Senovets	55:82	22	
14.	Kamen	42:85	20	
15.	Krusheto	34:96	17	−0

==== "B" west ====
place	team	score	points
1.	Vardim	99:41	48
2.	Patresh	114:51	47
3.	Kozlovets	86:29	45
4.	Oresh	97:57	44
5.	Batak	97:56	42
6.	Dragomirovo	88:61	38
7.	Hadzhidimitovo	91:68	37
8.	Varbovka	81:57	37
9.	Maslarovo	90:78	36
10.	Karaisen	60:67	33
11.	Klimentovo	82:86	32
12.	Lesitcheri	54:83	32
13.	Dolna Lipnitsa	66:92	30
14.	Gorna Lipnitsa	62:91	29
15.	Nedan	68:87	26
16.	Morava	51:91	23
17.	Alekovo	44:85	23

== Champions ==
=== Champions "A" grupa ===
No.	Season	Champion
1	1992–93	Lesitscheri
2	1993–94	Polucrayshte
3	1994–95	Klimentovo
4	1995–96	Mihaltsi
5	1996–97	Kristal(Gorna Oryahovitsa)
6	1997–98	Botev(Debelets)
7	1998–99	Klimentovo
8	1999–2000	Ivaylo-97(Veliko Tarnovo)
9	2000–01	Botev(Debelets)
10	2001–02	Elit(Svishtov)

No.	Season	Champion
11	2002–03	Lesitcheri
12	2003–04	
13	2004–05	
14	2005–06	
15	2006–07	
16	2007–08	
17	2008–09	Samovodene
18	2009–10	
19	2010–11	
20	2011–12	

No.	Season	Champion
21	2012–13	
22	2013–14	Laits(Veliko Tarnovo)
23	2014–15	Resen 2012
24	2015–16	Resen 2012
25	2016–17	Yantra Polski Trambesh
26	2017–18	Zemedelets-93
27	2018–19	Zemedelets-93

== Football teams 2016/2017 ==
=== Veliko Tarnovo Province Football League"North" ===
- FC Svetkavitsa Mihaltsy
- FC Udar Byala Cherkva
- FC Nedan Nedan
- FC Strala Orash
- FC Morava Morava
- FC Sportist Varbovka
- FC Ovcha mogila Ovcha mogila
- FC Ustrem Maslarevo
- FC Benkovski Balgarsko Slivovo
- FC Budeshte Butovo
- FC Dunav Vardim
- FC Dimcha Dimcha

=== Veliko Tarnovo Province Football League"South" ===
- FC Dolna Oryahovitsa Dolna Oryahovitsa
- FC Vladislav Dzhulyunitsa
- FC Parvomaytsi Parvomaytsi
- FC Draganovo Draganovo, Veliko Tarnovo Province
- FC Sportist Kozarevets
- FC Pobeda Kesarevo
- FC Rudanovski Konstantin
- FC Rositsa Polikrayshte
- FC Unak Merdanya
- FC Vihar Dobri dyal

=== Veliko Tarnovo Province Football League exteams ===
- FC Spartak Polski Senovets
- FC CSKA Vishovgrad
- FC Vihar Hadzhidimitrovo (village)
- FC Udar Petko Karavelovo
- FC Vihar Radanovo
- FC Strela Obedinenie
