= Strelets (disambiguation) =

Strelets is a term used to refer to a Russian infantryman from the 16th to the early 18th centuries.

Strelets may also refer to:

== Bulgaria ==
- Strelets, Stara Zagora Province, a village in the Stara Zagora Municipality, Stara Zagora Province
- Strelets, Veliko Turnovo Province, a village in the Gorna Oryahovitsa Municipality, Veliko Turnovo Province

== Hungary ==
- singular of Streltsy (Hungary), historical border guards in Őrség

== Russia ==
- Russian monitor Strelets, a warship built for the Imperial Russian Navy in the mid-1860s
- a truck-mounted variant of the 9K38 Igla surface-to-air missile system
- Strelets (military reconnaissance), a reconnaissance, control, and communications system of the Russian Armed Forces
- Strelets, Lipetsk Oblast, a village in Dolgorukovsky District, Lipetsk Oblast

== Ukraine ==
- Strelets Arab, an extinct breed of horse
