= Gorna Oryahovitsa Municipality =

Gorna Oryahovitsa Municipality Община Горна Оряховица
- Municipality
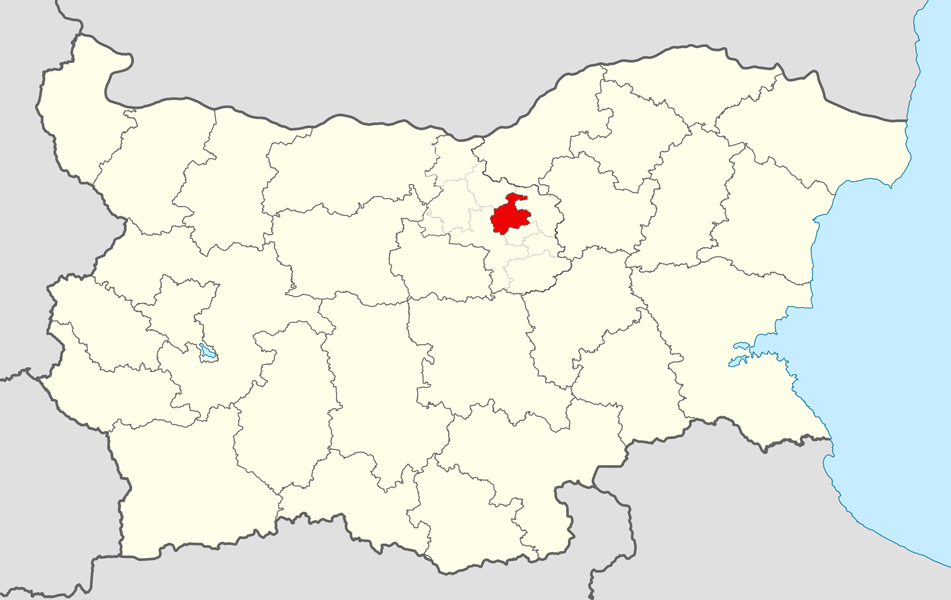
- Gorna Oryahovitsa Municipality within Bulgaria and Veliko Tarnovo Province.
- Coordinates: 43°9′N 25°42′E
- Country: Bulgaria
- Province (Oblast): Veliko Tarnovo
- Admin. centre (Obshtinski tsentar): Gorna Oryahovitsa

Area
  - Total: 318 km^{2} (123 sq mi)

Population (December 2009)
  - Total: 48,695
  - Density: 153/km^{2} (397/sq mi)
- Time zone: UTC+2 (EET)
  - Summer (DST): UTC+3 (EEST)

Gorna Oryahovitsa Municipality (Bulgarian: Община Горна Оряховица) is a municipality (obshtina) in Veliko Tarnovo Province, central-north Bulgaria. It covers an area of 318 km^{2} (123 sq mi) with a total population of 48,695 people (as of 2009-12-31). The administrative centre of the municipality is the town of Gorna Oryahovitsa, which is situated at the foot of Arbanashka Mountain, along the Yantra River.

== Settlements ==
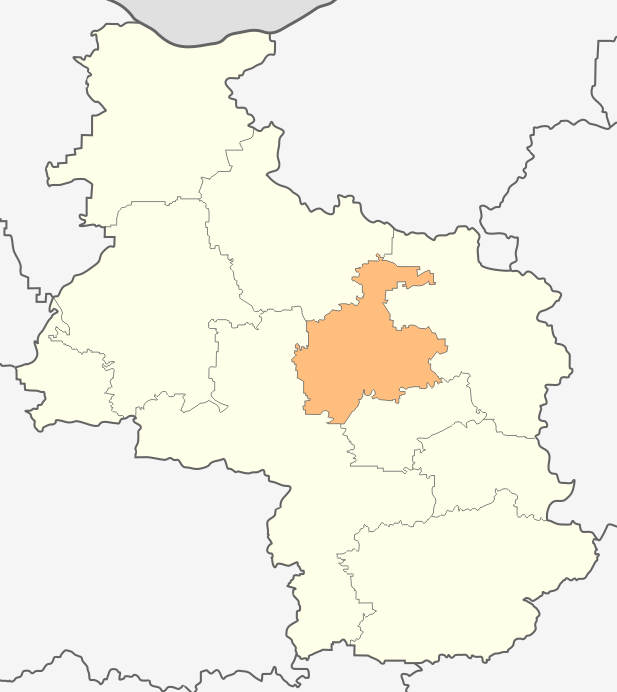
Gorna Oryahovitsa Municipality within Veliko Tarnovo Province

The municipality has 14 settlements (2 towns and 12 villages).

Note: The place names in bold have the status of town (in Bulgarian: град, transliterated as grad). Other localities have the status of village (in Bulgarian: село, transliterated as selo). The names of localities are transliterated in Latin alphabet, followed in parentheses by the original name in Bulgarian Cyrillic (which links to the corresponding Bulgarian Wikipedia article).

Town/Village	Cyrillic script	Population (December 2009)
**Dolna Oryahovitsa**	Долна Оряховица	3,027
Draganovo	Драганово	2,730
**Gorna Oryahovitsa**	Горна Оряховица	32,436
Gorski Dolen Trambesh	Горски Долен Тръмбеш	381
Gorski Goren Trambesh	Горски Горен Тръмбеш	202
Krusheto	Крушето	947
Paisiy	Паисий	197
Parvomaytsi	Първомайци	2,829
Pisarevo	Писарево	1,079
Polikraishte	Поликрайще	2,029
Pravda	Правда	637
Strelets	Стрелец	379
Varbitsa	Върбица	1,186
Yantra	Янтра	636
Total		48,695

== Demography ==
The following table shows the change of the population during the last four decades.

Gorna Oryahovitsa Municipality
Year	1975	1985	1992	2001	2005	2007	2009	2011
Population	58,413	62,367	58,529	53,142	50,909	49,707	48,695	...
Sources: Census 2001, Census 2011, „pop-stat.mashke.org“,

=== Religion ===
According to the latest Bulgarian census of 2011, the religious composition, among those who answered the optional question on religious identification, was the following:

Religious composition of Gorna Oryahovitsa Municipality
Orthodox Christianity	83.6%
Catholicism	0.5%
Protestantism	0.6%
Islam	5.6%
No religion	4.2%
Prefer not to answer, others and indefinable	5.4%

== See also ==
- Provinces of Bulgaria
- Municipalities of Bulgaria
- List of cities and towns in Bulgaria
