= Polski Trambesh =

Polski Trambesh Полски Тръмбеш
- Location of Polski Trambesh
- Coordinates: 43°23′N 25°39′E
- Country: Bulgaria
- Provinces (Oblast): Veliko Tarnovo

Government
  - Mayor: Georgi Chakarov
- Elevation: 15 m (49 ft)

Population (December 2009)
  - Total: 4,546
- Time zone: UTC+2 (EET)
  - Summer (DST): UTC+3 (EEST)
- Postal code: 5180
- Area code: 05515

Polski Trambesh (Bulgarian: Полски Тръмбеш [ˈpɔɫski trɐmˈbɛʃ]) is a town in central northern Bulgaria, part of Veliko Tarnovo Province. It is the administrative centre of the homonymous Polski Trambesh Municipality, which lies in the northeastern part of the Province. The town is located 36 kilometres from the provincial capital of Veliko Tarnovo, 45 km from Svishtov, 35 km from Pavlikeni, 33 km from Gorna Oryahovitsa, 22 km from Byala, Rousse Province, and 40 km from Strazhitsa. As of December 2009, Polski Trambesh had a population of 4,546.

The town is situated near the Yantra River, in the central Danubian Plain. Polski Trambesh's name means "Trambesh of the fields", to distinguish it from Gorski Goren Trambesh ("upper Trambesh of the forests") and Gorski Dolen Trambesh ("lower Trambesh of the forests") in Gorna Oryahovitsa municipality. It is not known when Polski Trambesh was established, but in 1865 it was a village of 40-50 houses populated by Bulgarians and Turks. The construction of the Rousse-Gorna Oryahovitsa railway boosted its development in 1917, the village turned into an important merchant centre and some industry was established after World War I. Polski Trambesh was proclaimed a town in 1964.

== Municipality ==
Polski Trambesh Municipality has an area of 463.6 square kilometres and includes the following 15 places:

- Ivancha
- Karantsi
- Klimentovo
- Kutsina
- Maslarevo
- Obedinenie
- Orlovets
- Pavel
- Petko Karavelovo
- Polski Senovets
- Polski Trambesh
- Radanovo
- Stefan Stambolovo
- Strahilovo
- Varzulitsa

== Honours ==
Trambesh Peak on Brabant Island, Antarctica is named after the town.
