= Paisiy =

Paisiy may be:

- the Bulgarian form of the name Paisius (see there for a list of people with the name)
- the common Bulgarian name of the 18th-century Paisius of Hilendar
- Paisiy (village), a village in Bulgaria
- Paisiy Peak, a mountain in the Antarctic
