= Polski Trambesh Municipality =

Polski Trambesh Municipality Община Полски Тръмбеш
- Municipality
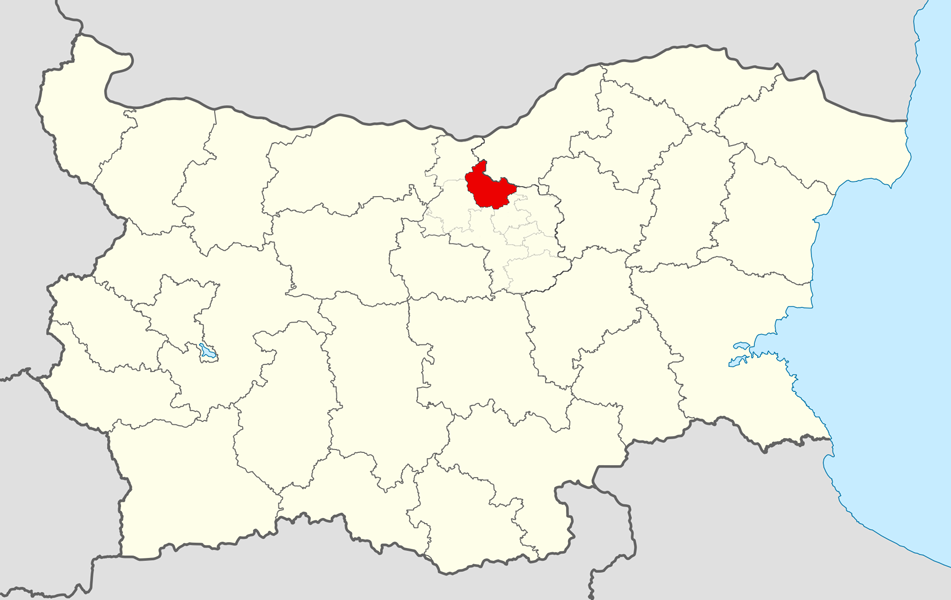
- Polski Trambesh Municipality within Bulgaria and Veliko Tarnovo Province.
- Coordinates: 43°20′N 25°36′E
- Country: Bulgaria
- Province (Oblast): Veliko Tarnovo
- Admin. centre (Obshtinski tsentar): Polski Trambesh

Area
  - Total: 463.66 km^{2} (179.02 sq mi)

Population (December 2009)
  - Total: 15,309
  - Density: 33.018/km^{2} (85.516/sq mi)
- Time zone: UTC+2 (EET)
  - Summer (DST): UTC+3 (EEST)

Polski Trambesh Municipality (Bulgarian: Община Полски Тръмбеш) is a municipality (obshtina) in Veliko Tarnovo Province, Central-North Bulgaria, located in the Danubian Plain. It is named after its administrative centre - the town of Polski Trambesh.

The municipality embraces a territory of 463.66 km^{2} (179.02 sq mi) with a population of 15,309 inhabitants, as of December 2009.

The main road E85 crosses the area centrally, from south to north, connecting the province centre of Veliko Tarnovo with the city of Ruse.

== Settlements ==
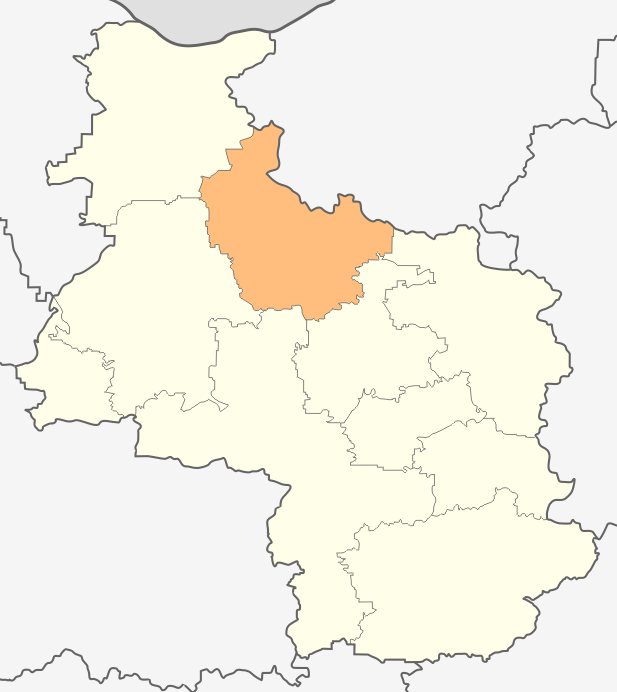
Polski Trambesh Municipality within Veliko Tarnovo Province

Polski Trambesh Municipality includes the following 15 places (towns are shown in bold):

Town/Village	Cyrillic	Population (December 2009)
**Polski Trambesh**	**Полски Тръмбеш**	4,546
Ivancha	Иванча	465
Karantsi	Каранци	318
Kutsina	Куцина	709
Klimentovo	Климентово	857
Maslarevo	Масларево	681
Obedinenie	Обединение	834
Orlovets	Орловец	557
Pavel	Павел	834
Polski Senovets	Полски Сеновец	770
Petko Karavelovo	Петко Каравелово	1,677
Radanovo	Раданово	1,686
Stefan Stambolovo	Стефан Стамболово	261
Strahilovo	Страхилово	942
Varzulitsa	Вързулица	172
Total		15,309

== Demography ==
The following table shows the change of the population during the last four decades.

Polski Trambesh Municipality
**Year**	1975	1985	1992	**2001**	2005	2007	2009	**2011**
**Population**	29,663	25,352	21,150	18,678	16,755	16,002	15,309	14,451
Sources: Census 2001, Census 2011, „pop-stat.mashke.org“,

Bulgarians form a majority in 14 out of 15 settlements. One village, Petko Karavelovo, has a Turkish majority with 58,7% of its population belonging to the Turkish minority in Bulgaria. The village of Radanovo has the largest Roma population in the municipality of Polski Trambesh, with 367 out of 508 Roma living in the village of Radanovo. Roma make up 29,0% of the population of the village of Radanovo.

== See also ==
- Provinces of Bulgaria
- Municipalities of Bulgaria
- List of cities and towns in Bulgaria
