= Zlia Zab =

Bulgarian mountain peak

Zlia Zab (Злия зъб)
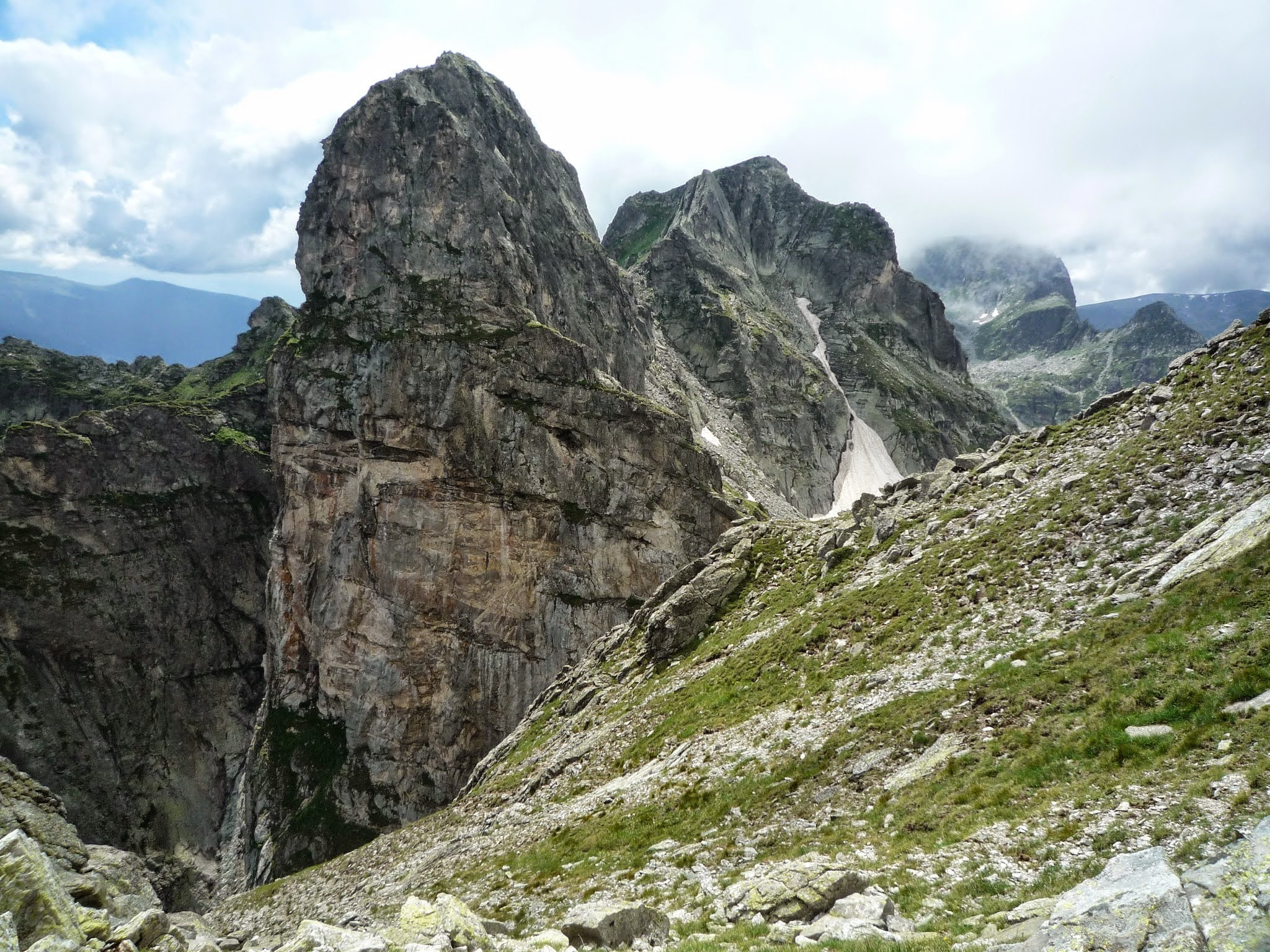

Highest point
- Elevation: 2,678 m (8,786 ft)
- Coordinates: 42°10′21.36″N 23°22′58.08″E

Geography
- Location: Bulgaria
- Parent range: Rila Mountains

Zlia Zab (Bulgarian: Злия зъб, meaning "The Evil Fang") is a summit in the northwestern part of the Rila mountain range in southwestern Bulgaria reaching height of 2,678 m. It is located on the boundary between Rila National Park and Rila Monastery Nature Park.

Zlia Zab raises on the main orographic node of northwestern Rila east of the major summit of Malyovitsa (2,729 m) between the summits of Lovnitsa (2,695 m) to the east and Orlovets (2,686 m), linked through rocky saddles. On the southern face of the saddles two dizzying gullies descend to the valley of the Rilska River some 1,200 m below, called the White and the Blue Gully.

From the very summit to the south begins a rocky ridge that reaches a rock opening called Halkata (the Ring); after it, the ridge splits, enclosing the Devil's Gully, the steepest of the gullies in the region, with almost vertical sills in places. On the eastern fork of the ridge are the Devil's Needles. On the western fork are the summits of Dvuglav (2,605 m) and Iglata (2,575 m), which together with Zlia Zab form a remarkable massif.

The summit is named Zlia Zab because of its very characteristic shape, reminiscent of a sharp dog's fang seen from the south.

Zlia Zab is an important site for rock climbing and mountaineering, including a 200 m wall with one of the most renown climbing routes in Bulgaria — Vezhdite.

== Gallery ==
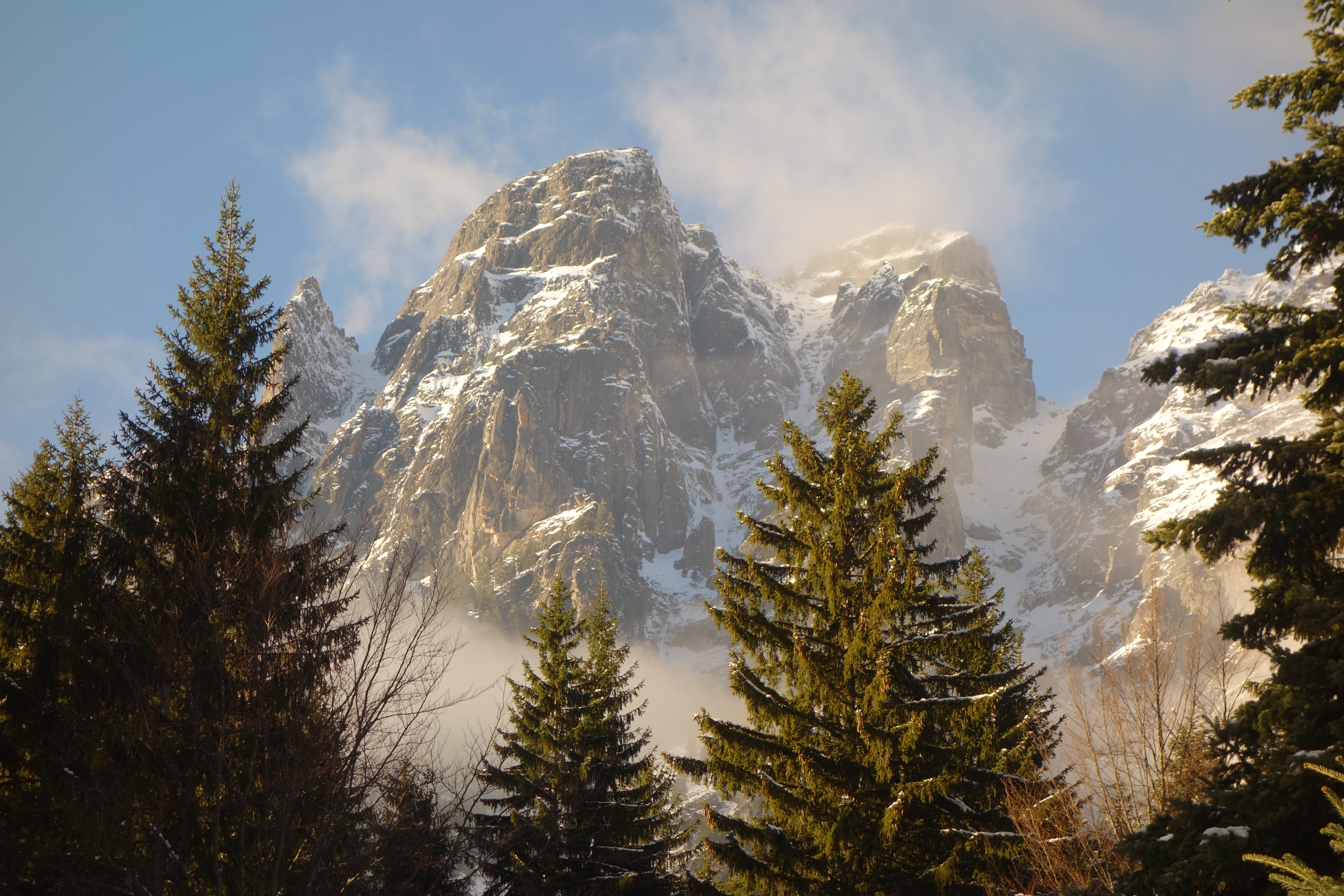
Zlia Zab (right), Dvuglav and Iglata

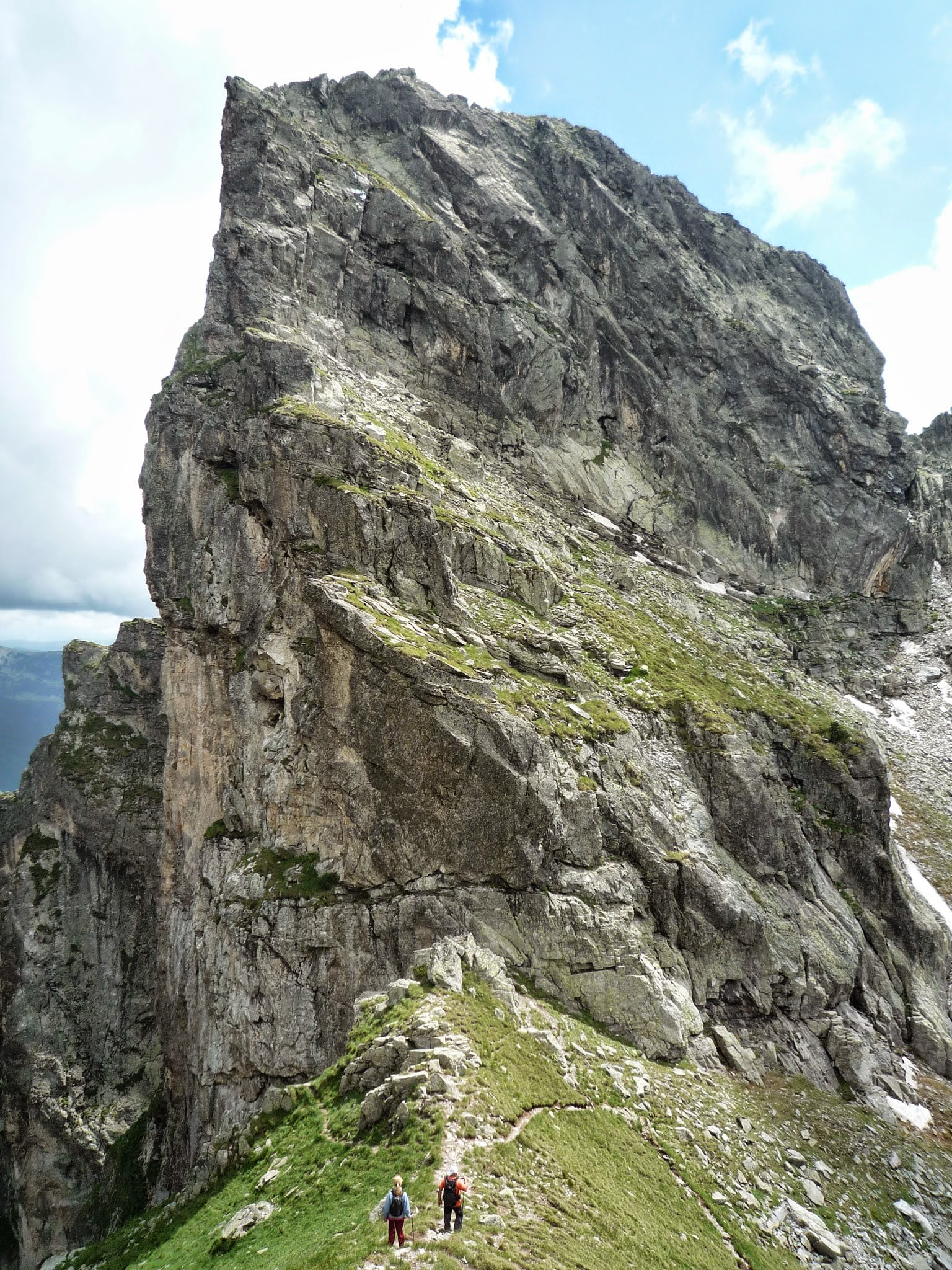
Zlia Zab from the east
