= Krusheto =

- Village
- Krusheto
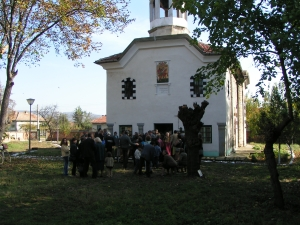
- Temple "Sv Dimitar" in Krusheto village, 2004.

- Location within Bulgaria
- Coordinates: 43.241682°N 25.674133°E
- Country: Bulgaria
- Province: Veliko Tarnovo
- Municipality: Gorna Oryahovitsa

Area
  - {{{area_blank1_title}}}: 17,818 km^{2} (6,880 sq mi)
- Elevation: 305 m (1,001 ft)

Population
  - Total: 820
- Postal code: 5134
- Area code: 06179

Krusheto is a village in Northern Bulgaria, in Gorna Oryahovitsa Municipality, Veliko Tarnovo Province. As of the 2020 census, the village has a population of 820 people with a current address registered in the settlement.

== Geography ==
Krusheto is at an elevation of 147 meters. It is in the northwest part of municipality Gorna Oryahovitsa and its area borders with Veliko Tarnovo and Polski Trambesh.

The river Yantra passes through the area of the village, which makes the lands fertile and eligible for harvest and agriculture. Another river that passes near the village is Rositsa.

75% of the landmass of the village is an agricultural domain, while 10% remain forests and the settlement takes up only 9% of the land area.

=== Culture ===
After the end of Ottoman rule in Bulgaria, the village's name changes from Armutli to Krusheto. Which means the same in both Turkish and Bulgarian languages – a place of Pear trees.

3 kilometers west of the village an Agricultural institute can be found. It specializes in educating agricultural workers in the respective field.

=== Buildings ===
- The church "Sveti Dimitar" was built in 1883.
- The Library and community center "Napredak", was built in 1906 and is still active.

== Ethnicity ==
According to the Bulgarian population census in 2011.

	Number	Percentage(в %)
Total	653	100.00
Bulgarians	516	96.81
Turks	0	0
Romani	0	0
Others	0	0
Do not define themselves	74	11.33
Unanswered	59	9.03
