= Pravda, Veliko Turnovo Province =

Pravda
- Village
- Pravda
- Location within Bulgaria
- Coordinates: 43.160646°N 25.680911°E
- Country: Bulgaria
- Province: Veliko Tarnovo
- subdivision Municipality: Gorna Oryahovitsa

Area
  - Total: 318 km^{2} (123 sq mi)
- Elevation: 92 m (302 ft)

Population
  - Total: 572
- Area code: 061704

Pravda is a village in Northern Bulgaria. The village is a part of Gorna Oryahovitsa Municipality, Veliko Tarnovo Province. Counted by the 2020 Bulgarian census, Pravda currently has a population of 572 people with a permanent address registration in the settlement.

== Geography ==
Pravda takes part in Gorna Oryahovitsa Municipality and is located at an elevation of 92 meters. The village exists in its current location (On the left shore of the Yantra River) since 1897.

== Culture ==
In 1952 the name of the village was changed to Pravda from Tsiganovo. The first known written text that mentions the village dates back to the year 1415.

The roads in the village are straight and asphalted. There are two large agricultural facilities that are still operational in the field of seeds production.

The total number of households in the village is around 400.

=== Buildings ===
During the period after the merger of the two villages Sergyuvets and Teminsko, Parvomaytsi flourishes as a settlement. Most buildings were built during that time.

- In 1905, the community hall and library "Zvezda 1905" was built. It is still acting.

== Ethnicity ==
According to the Bulgarian population census in 2011.

	Number	Percentage (In %)
Total	630	100.00
Bulgarians	564	89.52
Turks	0	0
Romani	0	0
Others	4	0.63
Do not define themselves	0	0
Unanswered	60	9.52
