= Ivan Bochev =

Bulgarian artist

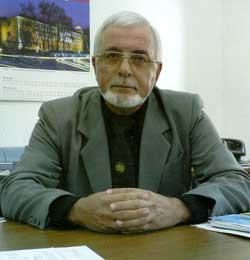
- Ivan Bochev in his office at the Veliko Tarnovo University
- Born: Ivan Bochev; October 12, 1946 (age 79); Draganovo, Bulgaria
- Education: Veliko Tarnovo University
- Movement: abstract art; graphic art; landscape painting
- Website: Ivan Bochev Official Website

Ivan Bochev is a Bulgarian artist, arts teacher and scholar from Veliko Tarnovo, Bulgaria.

== Youth and early life ==
Bochev was born in his family's farm in the village of Draganovo, situated 25 km North of Veliko Turnovo on 12 October 1946. He finished the local school and applied to the Veliko Tarnovo University. He was admitted with a scholarship, scoring high marks on the exams without having taken any special classes prior.

In 1975 Bochev graduated graphic art at the Veliko Tarnovo University's faculty of Fine arts with distinction. A few years later he was invited to teach art, and after winning a competition, he was appointed as a full-time lecturer.

== Academic career ==
In 1991 Bochev, became an associate professor at the Veliko Tarnovo University. Later he became dean of the arts department and was the first one in the university's history to be re-elected for the position three times in a row.

== Awards ==
List of notable awards:

- 2012 – International Bianale Varna, Bulgaria
- 2007 – Annual award of the mayor “Veliko Tarnovo”
- 1988 – Montana, OHI
- 1985 – Montana, “A look through the ages” plenum
- 1984 – Varna, 3rd place at national competition

== List of solo exhibitions ==
- 2009 - Istanbul, Turkey
- 2005 – Sevlievo, Bulgaria;
- 1998 – Gallery “Spectur, V. Turnovo, Bulgaria;
- 1996 – Deutsches Theater, Goettingen, Germany;
- 1996 – Bohemico Gallery Hanover, Germany;
- 1995 – Town Library, Schwerte, Germany
- 1994 – National exhibitions in Autumn, Plovdiv, Bulgaria;
- 1994 – Senator's Library, Brazil;
- 1994 – Monica Elizabeth Gallery, Hemer, Germany;
- 1986 – V. Turnovo, Bulgaria;
- 1986 – St. Zagora, Bulgaria;
- 1984 – Varna,
- 1978 – Cracow, Poland
