= Pisarevo, Veliko Tarnovo Province =

Pisarevo
- Village
- Pisarevo
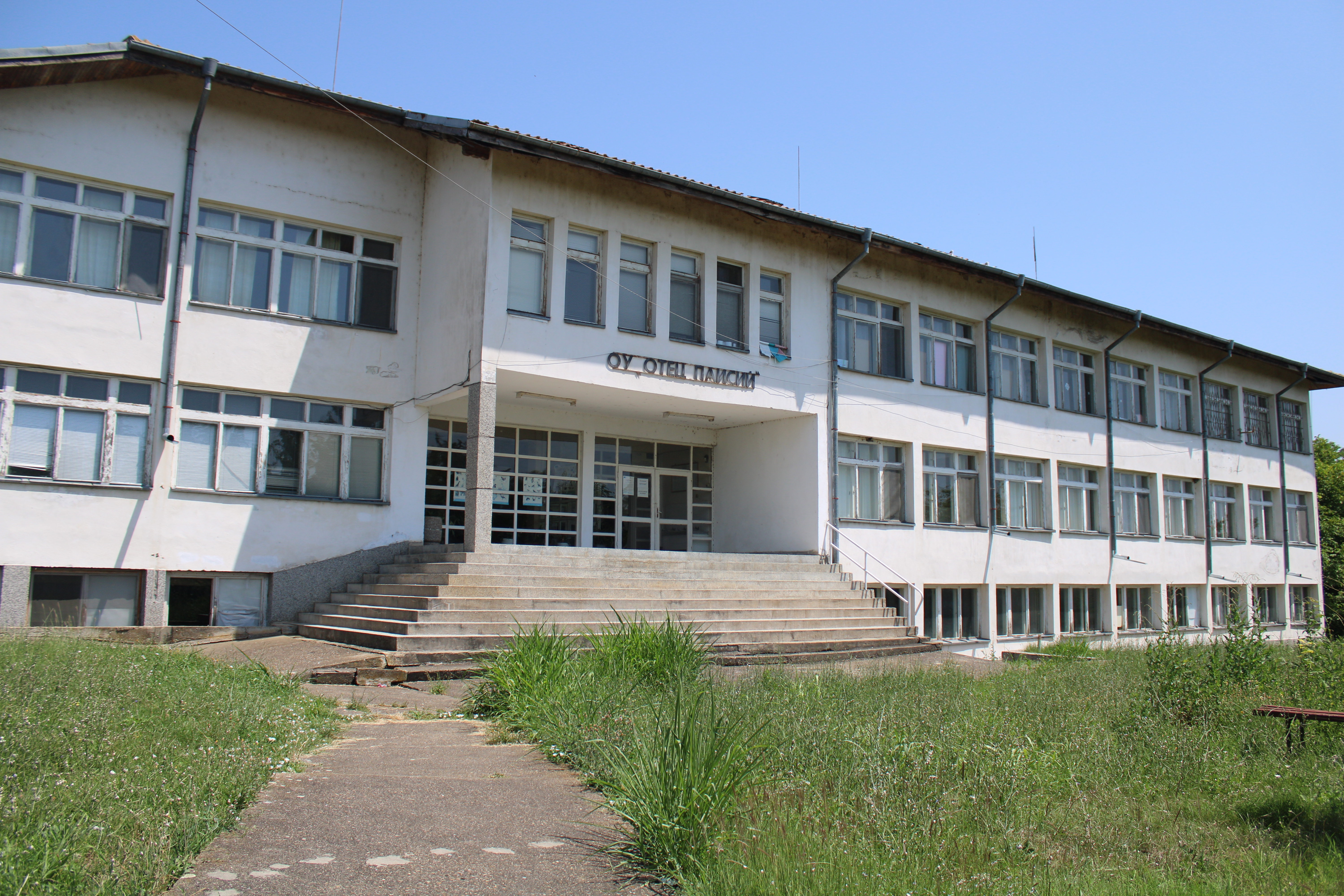
- School in Pisarevo, Bulgaria

- Location within Bulgaria
- Coordinates: 43.155779°N 25.7902141°E
- Country: Bulgaria
- Province: Veliko Tarnovo
- Municipality: Gorna Oryahovitsa

Area
  - Total: 11.26 km^{2} (4.35 sq mi)
- Elevation: 72 m (236 ft)

Population
  - Total: 1,079
- Postal code: 5127
- Area code: 06175

Pisarevo is a village in Northern Bulgaria, part of the Gorna Oryahovitsa municipality in Veliko Tarnovo Province. In the 2020 Bulgarian census, it has a permanent resident population of 1079.

== Geography ==
Pisarevo village is located at an elevation of 72 meters. Initially the village was located in the Lozitsa area, and then it was moved on the left shore of Yantra river, and finally it settled in its current location.

The main occupation of the inhabitants is animal husbandry.

== Culture ==
The first written text found about the village of Pisarevo dates back to the Emperor soldier of the Roman Empire - Trajan.

The old name of the village used to be Yzazhikyoy which meant the blind Turks. The village was moved three times before it settles to its current location.

More than 800 of the 1000 population of the village are Muslims.

History of the school In 1867. At the initiative of the Bulgarians who came from the Balkan – Dimitar Atanasov, Penyo Petrov, Ivan Ganev, began to train students in the village of Pisarevo. They gathered in the houses of the initiators and there they learned reading and writing. The first teacher was Haji Tsonyo. After him is Nikola, known by the nickname "The Lame Teacher". In 1870. The population in the village is growing / 700 - 800 people / and all jointly set out to build a cell / school /. Between 1874 and 1878. In the village there are many teachers from surrounding villages. Seeing that the cell was small for the increased number of children and at the insistence of the inspection in 1890. A primary school was built. It was destroyed by an earthquake in 1912. It was rebuilt in 1915. Due to the increased interest of Bulgarians to educate their children and the increased population in 1930. Another junior high school was built. The following year, the first classes began. After September 9, 1944. There were already two schools in the village of Pisarevo. One from the 1st to the 4th grade, and the other from the 5th to the 7th grade. The devastating earthquake of 07.12.1986 in Strazhitsa caused serious damage to the building and this forced for 8 years the administrative building of the former cooperative farm to be used for a school. [5] On 12.09.1992. The construction of another school began, completed and officially opened on 08.12.1994. under the name Otets Paisiy Primary School.

The community center has been in existence since 1905 and is called "Consent".

In the center of the village is a village fountain built in 1929. It is around it annually held a national holiday of authentic folklore "Na megdana". The purpose of the holiday is to preserve and promote Bulgarian folk traditions, customs and folk songs. The festival is not of a competitive nature, as well as age restrictions. Participants and guests of the holiday have the opportunity to taste traditional dishes and enjoy the culinary skills of Pisarov citizens.

== Buildings ==
In 1867 the first school in Pisarevo was established. Classes met in villagers' homes due to the lack of a schoolhouse. The first church school was built in 1870 and, in 1930, the first high school.

In 1929, one of Pisarevo's largest fountains was constructed.

In 1905, the library and community hall, Saglasie, was built, followed by a 1991 mosque.

== Ethnicity ==
According to the Bulgarian population census in 2011.

	Number	Percentage(в %)
Total	794	100.00
Bulgarians	224	28.21
Romani	535	67.38
Others	0	0
Do not define themselves	0	0
Unanswered	23	2.89
