= Paisiy (village) =

- Village
- Paisiy
- Location within Bulgaria
- Coordinates: 43.309099°N 25.828609°E
- Country: Bulgaria
- Province: Veliko Tarnovo
- Municipality: Gorna Oryahovitsa

Area
  - Total: 12.656 km^{2} (4.887 sq mi)
- Elevation: 210 m (690 ft)

Population
  - Total: 118
- Postal code: 5173
- Area code: 06166

Paisiy (Bulgarian: Паисий [pɐˈisij]) is a village in Northern Bulgaria, in Gorna Oryahovitsa Municipality, in the province of Veliko Tarnovo. According to the 2020 census, the village has a population of 118 people.

== Geography ==
Paisiy village is at an elevation of 210 meters. The village is positioned northeast of Gorna Oryahovitsa, in a small valley between the villages of Strelets, Lozen, and Vinograd.

== History ==
Near Paisiy village there are traces of Thracian and Roman settlements and a preserved old Roman road.

Before 1934 the village was known as Arnauti (Арнаути [ɐrnɐˈuti]), so named because of the Arnauts (Bulgarian: Arnauti) living there during Ottoman times.

=== Buildings ===
- The school was built in 1936 and was closed in the 1970s due to a lack of pupils.
- Paisiy is one of the few villages in the municipality lacking a community hall and library.

== Ethnicity ==
According to the Paisiy village records in October 2025.

	Number	Percentage(в %)
Total	170	100.00
Bulgarians	60	35.29
Turks	73	42.94
Romani	0	0
British	14	8.23
Polish	7	4.12
USA	3	1.76
Do not define themselves	0	0
Unanswered	13	7.64
