= Streltsy (Hungary) =

The streltsy (singular: strelets, translated as shooter) were traditional border guards in Őrség, a historical region of Hungary, in the village Sztrelec (Strelets). The village was to seat oneself near in Kančevci (now in Slovenia).

The streltsy were of Slovenian nationality, armed with the bow. In the 16th century, the Ottoman-Turks attacked Sztrelec and at up the village.
