= Pavel (village) =

Coordinates: 43°28′2″N 25°31′52″E

Pavel (Bulgarian: Павел [ˈpavɛɫ]) is a village in Polski Trambesh Municipality, Veliko Tarnovo Province, Bulgaria. Its current population is 874.. The current mayor of the village is Anka Pencheva Licheva.
