= Gorski Goren Trambesh =

- Gorski Goren Trambesh
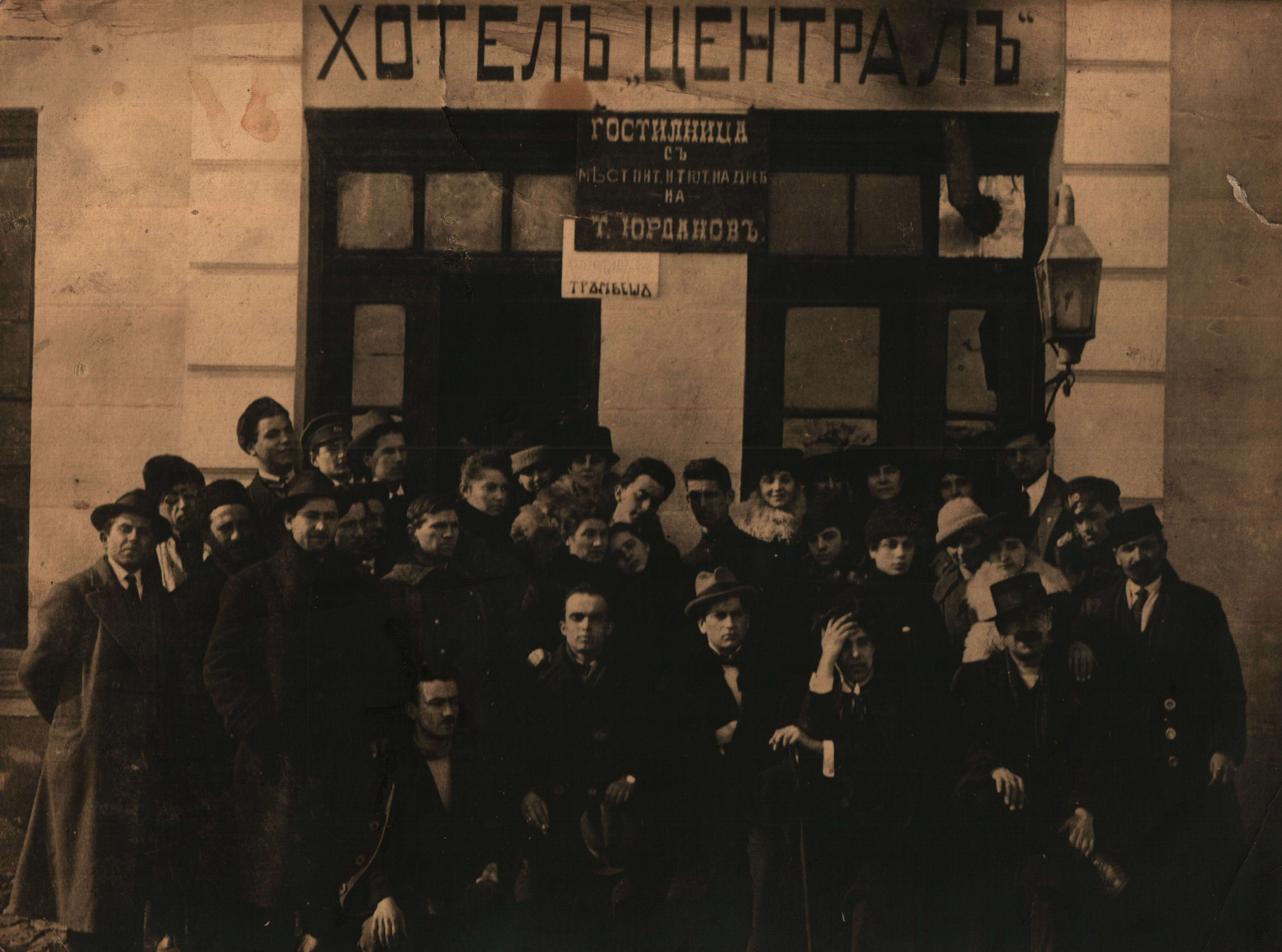
- Bulgarian Opera Artists in front of a Hotel in Gorski Goren Trambesh, 1940

- Location within Bulgaria
- Coordinates: 43.224432°N 25.840548°E
- Country: Bulgaria
- Province: Veliko Tarnovo
- Municipality: Gorna Oryahovitsa

Area
  - Total: 14,669 km^{2} (5,664 sq mi)
- Elevation: 305 m (1,001 ft)

Population
  - Total: 148
- Postal code: 5132
- Area code: 5132

Gorski Goren Trambesh is a village, located in Northern Bulgaria. The village is located in Gorna Oryahovitsa Municipality, Veliko Tarnovo Province. As of the 2020 census, the village has a population of 148 people.

== Geography ==
The village of Gorski Goren Trambesh is located at an elevation of 350 meters. The settlement is close near two hills, northern from the valley of Yantra River.

The distance between Gorski Goren Trambesh and Gorna Oryahovitsa is 25 km. It is located 30 km away from Veliko Tarnovo.

=== Culture ===
Two kilometers away from the village there is an ancient area called Suludzhak, where traces of many civilizations such as the Roman Empire, Thracians and medieval Bulgarians have been found.

=== Buildings ===
- The church “Sv. Ivan Rilski” was built in 1885, and was later renovated in 1987 after a massive earthquake.
- The Library and community center, was built in 1906 and is still active.

=== Ethnicity ===
According to the Bulgarian population census in 2011.

	Number	Percentage(в %)
Total	157	100.00
Bulgarians	152	96.81
Turks		
Romani	3	1.91
Others	0	0.00
Do not define themselves		
Unanswered	1	0.63
