= Draganovo, Veliko Tarnovo Province =

Draganovo
- Village
- Location in Bulgaria
- Coordinates: 43°13′15.4″N 25°44′48.2″E
- Country: Bulgaria
- Province: Veliko Tarnovo Province
- Municipality: Gorna Oryahovitsa Municipality
- Time zone: UTC+2 (EET)
  - Summer (DST): UTC+3 (EEST)

Draganovo (Bulgarian: Драганово) is a village in Gorna Oryahovitsa Municipality in Veliko Tarnovo Province in Central Bulgaria.

Draganovo is known in the area for its farms and vegetable gardens. Due to the fertile soil around the village, it is one of the main producers of cabbage and tomatoes in the central/northeastern regions of Bulgaria.

After World War II, gardeners from Draganovo were dispatched to Hungary and other parts of Europe to help rebuild the land and make it fertile again.

The Yantra Rivers flows through the village. The river contributes to the village's fertile soil.

== Notables ==
- Asen Razcvetnikov - Bulgarian writer
- Ivan Bochev - award-winning Bulgarian artist
