= Paisius =

Païsius or Païsios is a given name. Notable people with the name include:

== Saints ==
- Pishoy or Bishoy, 320-417 AD, an Egyptian desert father and Christian saint; Παΐσιος Paisios is the Greek form and Paisius the Latin form
- Saint Paisius of Uglich, Abbot (1504)
- Saint Paisius Velichkovsky, 17th century monk and theologian, the founder of modern Eastern Orthodox staretsdom
- Saint Paisius of Hilendar (Paisiy Hilendarski), an 18th-century Bulgarian National Revival figure
- Serbian Patriarch Paisius I (1614-1647)
- Saint Paisie Olaru of Sihăstria (1990)
- Saint Paisios (Eznepidis), also known as Elder Paisios of Mount Athos, schema-monk (1994)

== Hierarchs ==
- Patriarch Paisius I of Jerusalem, 17th century
- Patriarch Paisius of Alexandria, patriarch from 1657 to 1678
- Patriarch Paisius I of Constantinople
- Patriarch Paisius II of Constantinople, 18th century
- Serbian Patriarch Paisius II (1758)
- Paisius Ligarides
- Paisius II of Caesarea, Metropolitan of Caesarea in Cappadocia from 1832 to 1871
