= St. John of Rila Church, Targovishte =

Church in Targovishte, Bulgaria

St. John of Rila Church Църква Св. Иван Рилски (in Bulgarian)
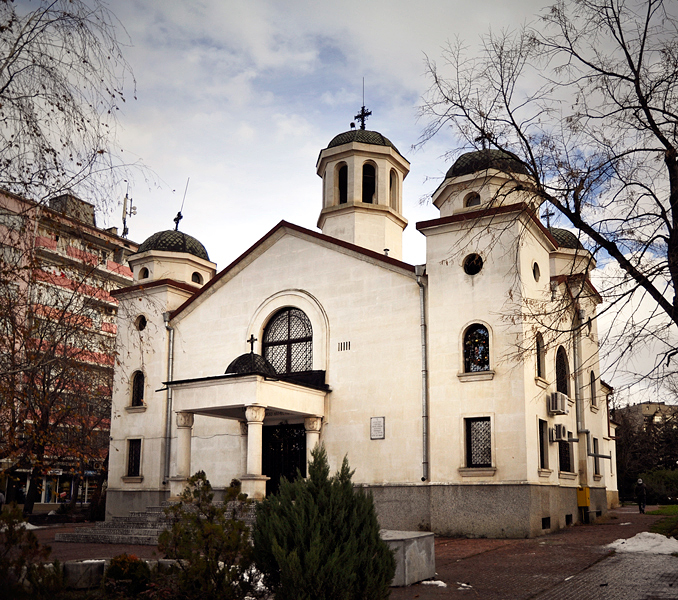

Religion
- Affiliation: Eastern Orthodox
- Province: Targovishte Province
- Ecclesiastical or organizational status: Church

Location
- Location: Targovishte, Bulgaria
- Interactive map of St. John of Rila Church; Църква Св. Иван Рилски (in Bulgarian)
- Coordinates: 43°15′2″N 26°34′20″E

Architecture
- Completed: 1936

St. John of Rila Church (Bulgarian: Църква Св. Иван Рилски / Tsarkva Sveti Ivan Rilski) is an Eastern Orthodox church building in Targovishte, Bulgaria.

It is named after the Bulgarian Saint John of Rila (876 – c. 946) who was the first Bulgarian hermit.

The building is in the north of the town center, near the central market-place.

== Architecture ==
The construction of the church started in 1912 but soon after that it was stopped because of the Balkan War. Finally it was completed in 1936. In 1961 unique wood-carved chancel-screen was made by professor Petar Kushlev.

During the Seventies it was completely repaired and reconstructed with the donation from Andrey, Metropolitan of New York, who was the diocesan prelate of the Bulgarian Eastern Orthodox Diocese of the USA, Canada and Australia. He was buried in the church – narthex after his death in 1972.

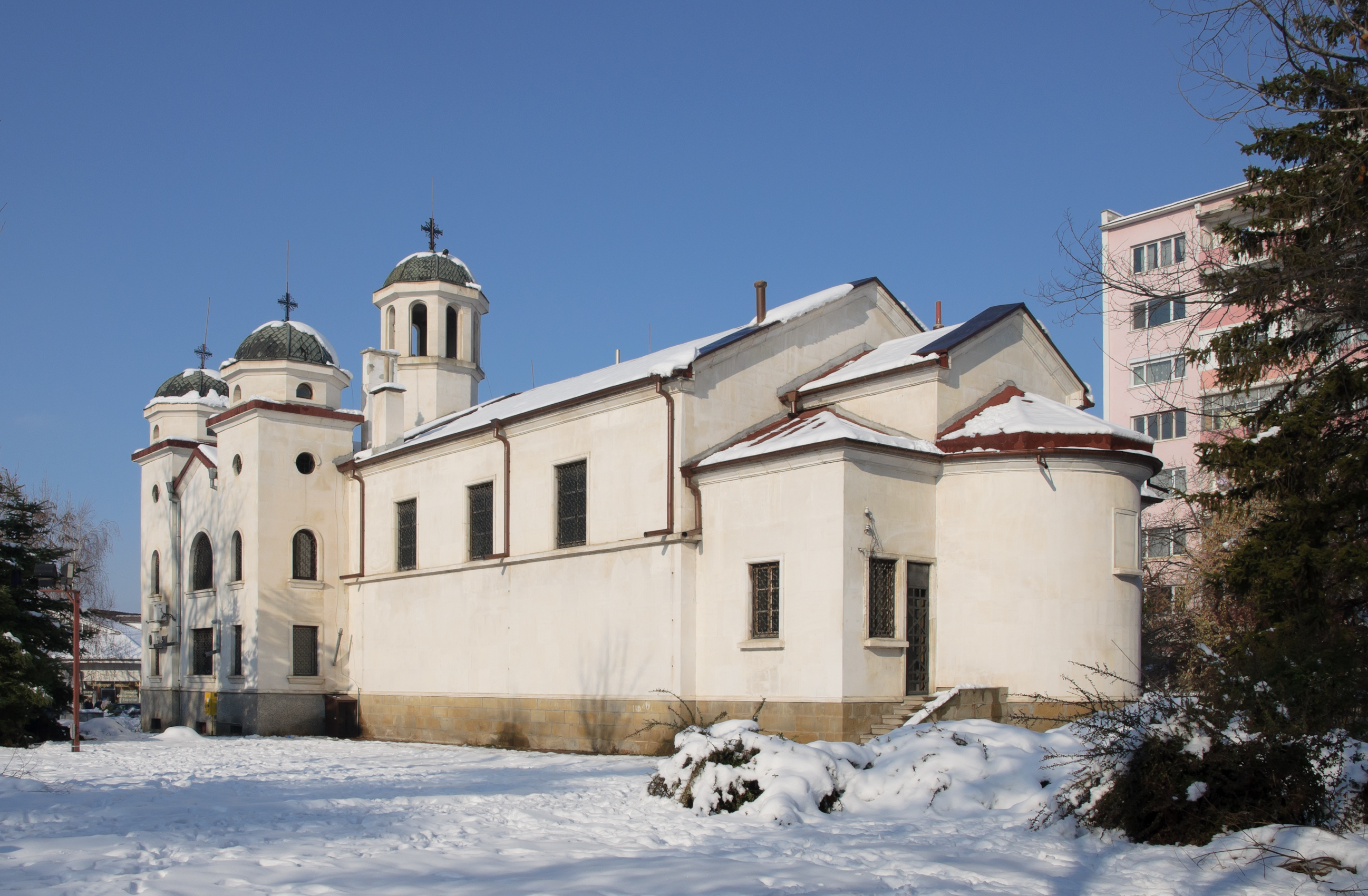
