= Gorski Dolen Trambesh =

Gorski Dolen Trambesh Горски Долен Трамбеш
- Village
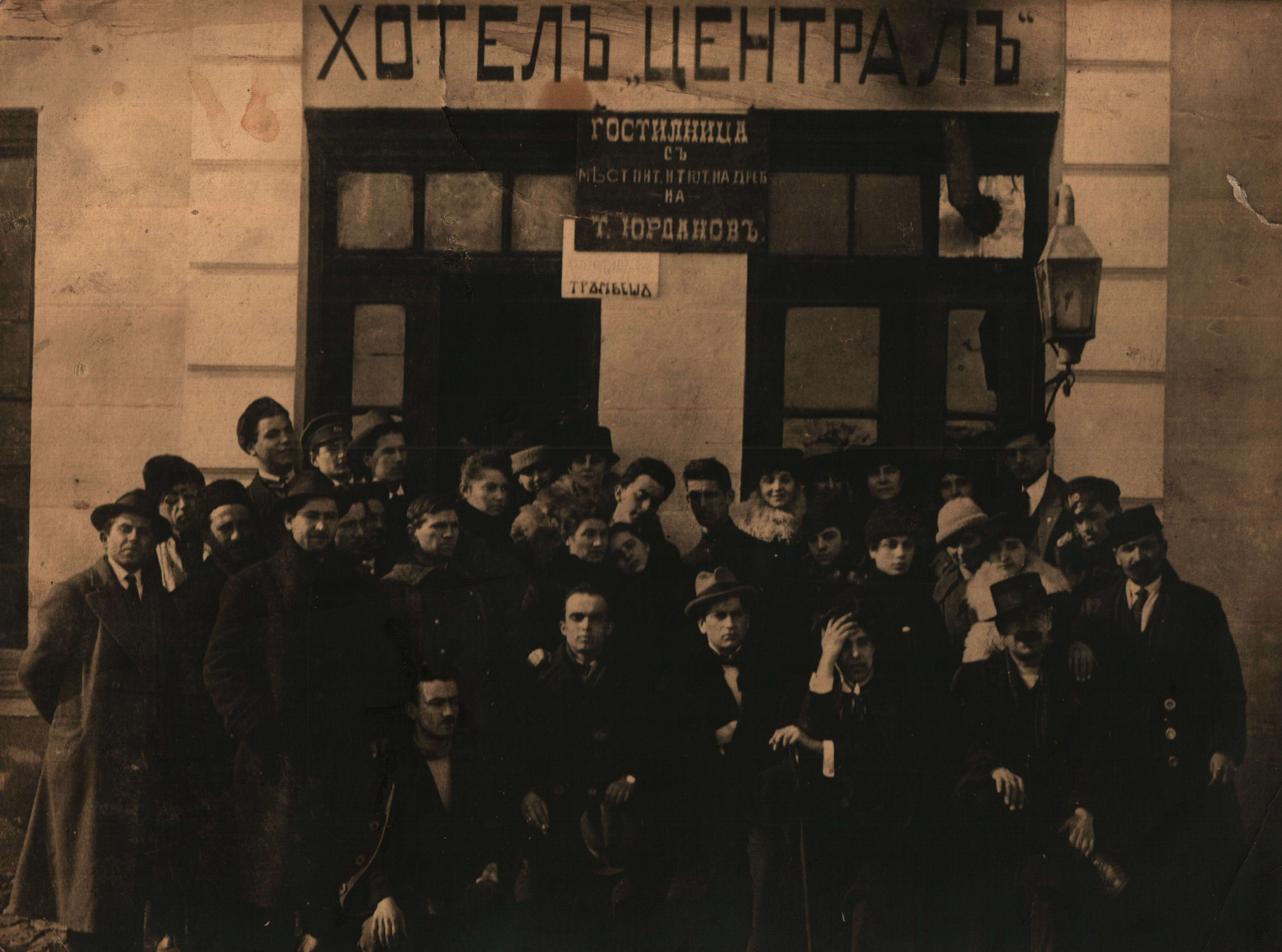
- Bulgarian Opera Artists in front of Gorski Trambesh Hotel in 1940, Source: DAA

- Location within Bulgaria
- Coordinates: 43.2°N 25.85°E
- Country: Bulgaria
- Province: Veliko Tarnovo Province
- Municipality: Gorna Oryahovitsa Municipality

Area
  - Total: 12.766 km^{2} (4.929 sq mi)

Population
  - Total: 355
  - Density: 10.7/km^{2} (27.8/sq mi)
- Postal code: 5131
- Area code: 061705

Gorski Dolen Trambesh is a village in Northern Bulgaria. It is located in Gorna Oryahovitsa Municipality, Veliko Tarnovo Province. According to the 2020 June Census, the total population count of the village is 355 people.

== Geography ==
The village is located 215 kilometers north-east of Sofia and 20 kilometers away from Veliko Tarnovo Gorski Dolen Trambesh is located on the south slope of the "Kaleto" geographical area near Gorna Oryahovitsa.

The soil in the area is fertile, and the agricultural land is mainly spread near the two rivers passing near the village - Yantra and Lefedzha (Stara Reka).

The traditional crops gathered are wheat, corn, and barley. Moreover, the largest vineyard of 500 decares of Gorna Oryahovitsa Municipality is located near the village. Desert and wine varieties like Aligote and Rkatsiteli are grown there, as well as the Bolgar grape.
