= Yantra, Veliko Tarnovo Province =

Yantra
- Village
- Yantra
- Location within Bulgaria
- Coordinates: 43.207379°N 25.6807°E
- Country: Bulgaria
- Province: Veliko Tarnovo
- Municipality: Gorna Oryahovitsa

Area
  - Total: 27.97 km^{2} (10.801 sq mi)
- Elevation: 59 m (194 ft)

Population
  - Total: 604
- Postal code: 5135
- Area code: 06177

Yantra is a village in Northern Bulgaria. The village is located in Gorna Oryahovitsa Municipality, Veliko Tarnovo Province. Аccording to the 2020 Bulgarian census, Yantra has a population of 604 people with a permanent address registration in the settlement.

== Geography ==
The majority of Yantra village's land area is covered by agricultural territories with 82%. 11% of the territories are urbanized areas, 3% water masses, and 2% forests.

The main livelihood of the local population is animal husbandry, followed by agricultural activities.

The elevation in the village varies between 50 and 99 meters with an average of 59 meters.

== Culture ==
The old name of the village was Murgazli. In 1934, it was renamed to its current name - Yantra. Archeological finds from antiquity and the Iron Age were found near the village.

=== Buildings ===
- In 1868, the village's school was established.
- In 1923, the villagers built the community hall and library "Probuda".
- The church was built in the early 19th century and later rebuilt in 1937.

== Ethnicity ==
According to the Bulgarian population census in 2011:

	Number	Percentage(in %)
Total	559	100.00
Bulgarians	453	81.03
Turks	15	2.68
Romani	42	7.51
Others	0	0
Do not define themselves	3	0.53
Unanswered	46	8.22
