= Strelets, Veliko Turnovo Province =

Strelets
- Village
- Strelets
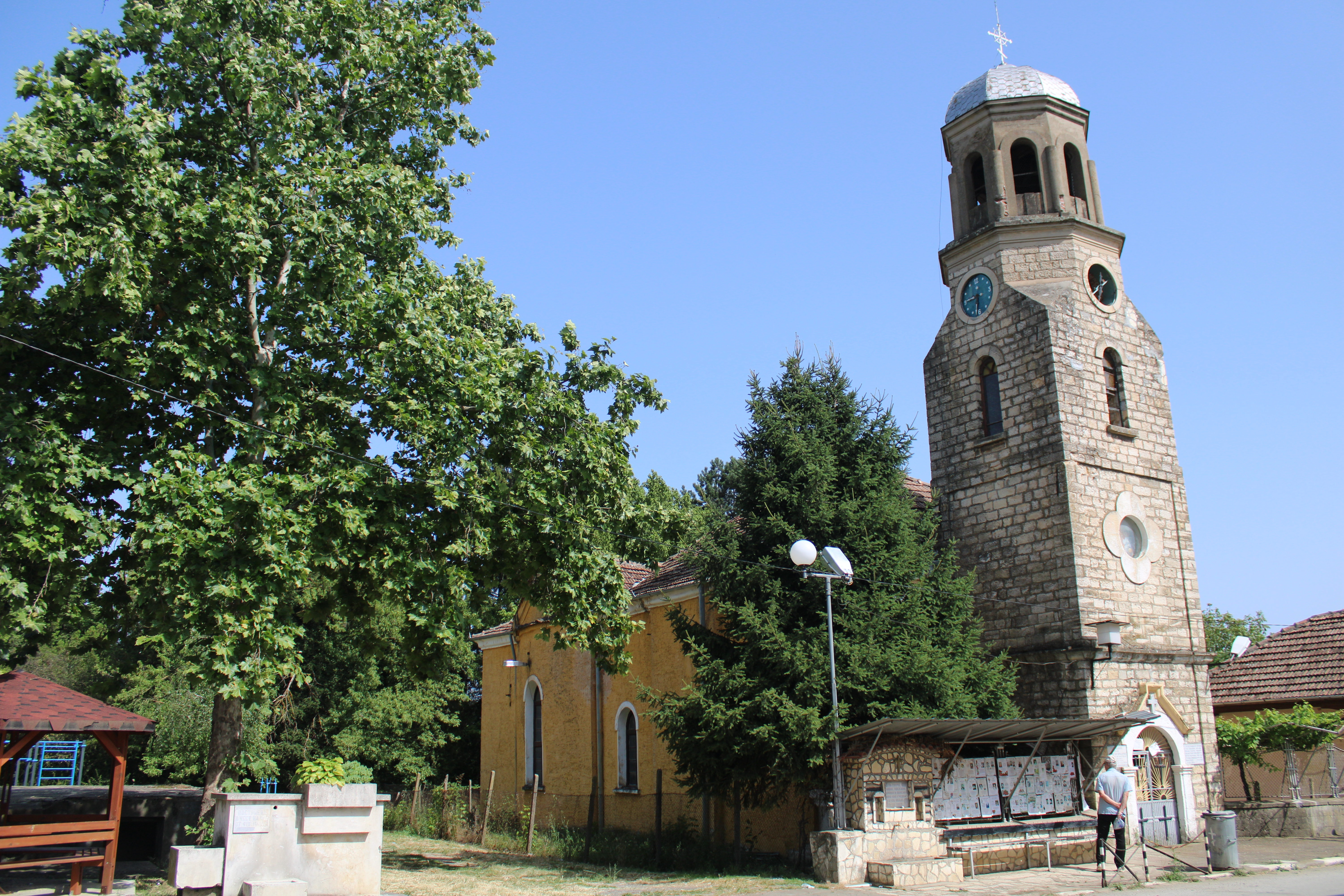

- Location within Bulgaria
- Coordinates: 43.306177°N 25.766614°E
- Country: Bulgaria
- Province: Veliko Tarnovo
- Municipality: Gorna Oryahovitsa

Area
  - Total: 27.679 km^{2} (10.687 sq mi)
- Elevation: 319 m (1,047 ft)

Population
  - Total: 317
- Postal code: 5133
- Area code: 06178

Strelets is a village in Northern Bulgaria, in Gorna Oryahovitsa Municipality, Veliko Tarnovo Province. Counted by the 2020 Bulgarian census, Strelets currently has a population of 317 people with a permanent address registration in the settlement.

== Geography ==
The village is 25 kilometers from Gorna Oryahovitsa.

Strelets takes part in Gorna Oryahovitsa Municipality and has an average elevation of 319 meters, ranging between 270 and 450 m, making it one of the highest elevated villages in the area of Veliko Tarnovo.

There are four dams in the village's vicinity. The majority of the landmass of the village is covered with agricultural lands – 69%, followed by forests with 23% and urbanized areas with 6%.

The favorable climatic conditions of the area favor the development of hunting, cattle breeding, beekeeping, and sheep breeding.

== Culture ==
Strelets village was established in the middle of the 19th century. The first two families who moved to the area were soap manufacturers.

The initial population of the village consisted mainly of Ottoman people, who were dedicated to raising bees hives.

=== Buildings ===
During the period after the merger of the two villages Sergyuvets and Teminsko, Parvomaytsi flourishes as a settlement. Most buildings were built during that time.

- In 1900, the village's library and community hall "Zarya" was built. It is still acting.
- In 2008, the municipality voted that the school in the village be closed.

== Ethnicity ==
According to the Bulgarian population census in 2011.

	Number	Percentage(in %)
Total	328	100.00
Bulgarians	200	60.97
Turks	113	34.45
Romani	0	0
Others	0	0
Do not define themselves	0	0
Unanswered	13	3.96
