= Polski Senovets =

Polski Senovets Полски Сеновец
- Village
- Location within Bulgaria
- Coordinates: 43°18′0″N 25°36′0″E
- Country: Bulgaria
- Province: Veliko Tarnovo
- Municipality: Polski Trambesh

Government
  - Mayor: Maryan Tonev

Area
  - Total: 37,508 km^{2} (14,482 sq mi)
- Elevation: 134 m (440 ft)

Population
  - Total: 770
- Time zone: UTC+2 (EET)
  - Summer (DST): UTC+3 (EEST)
- Post code: 5193
- Area code: 06146

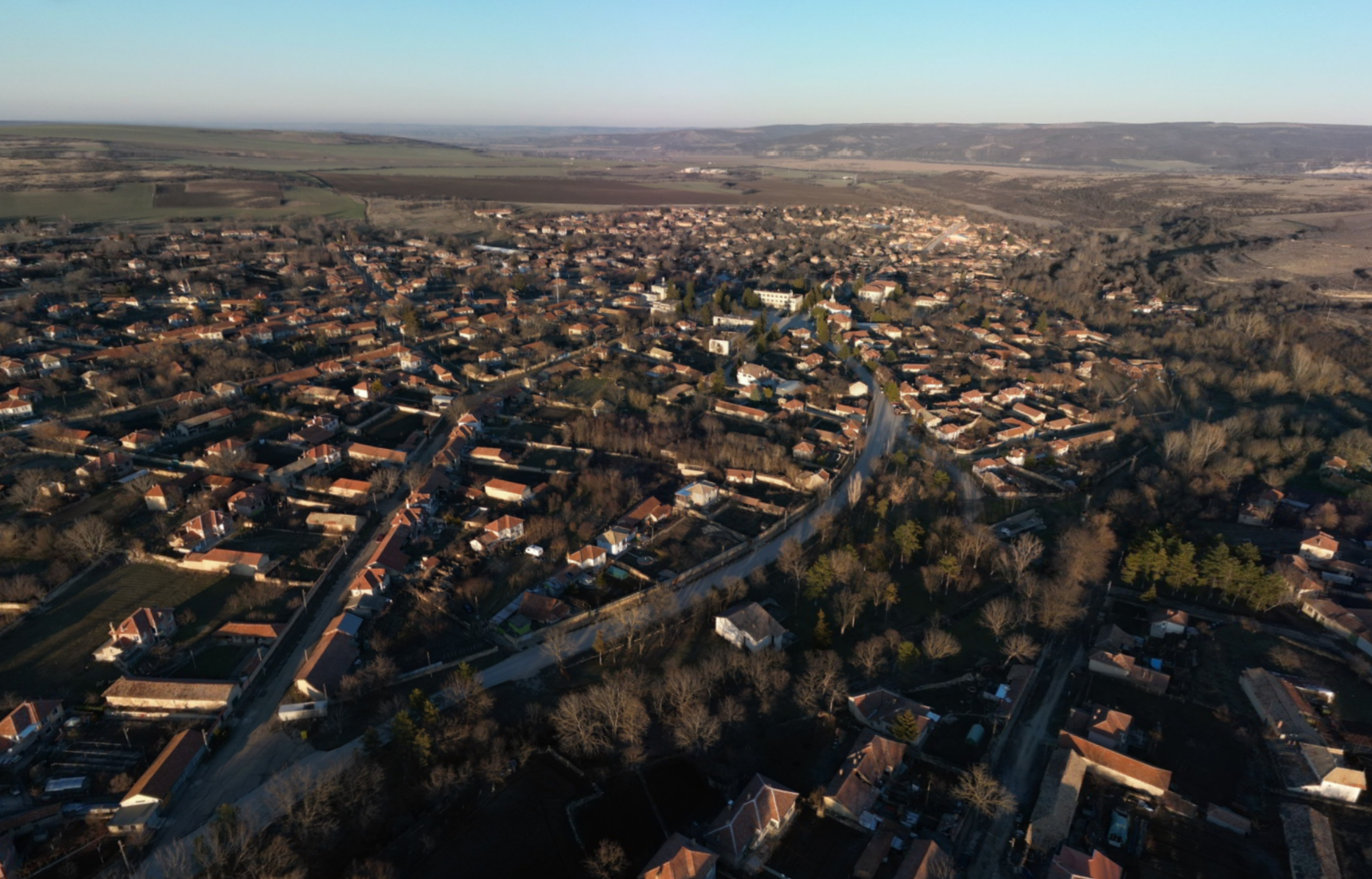
Polski Senovets from 400ft February 2024 looking East.

Polski Senovets (Bulgarian: Полски Сеновец) is a village in Veliko Tarnovo Province, north-central Bulgaria.

== Geography ==
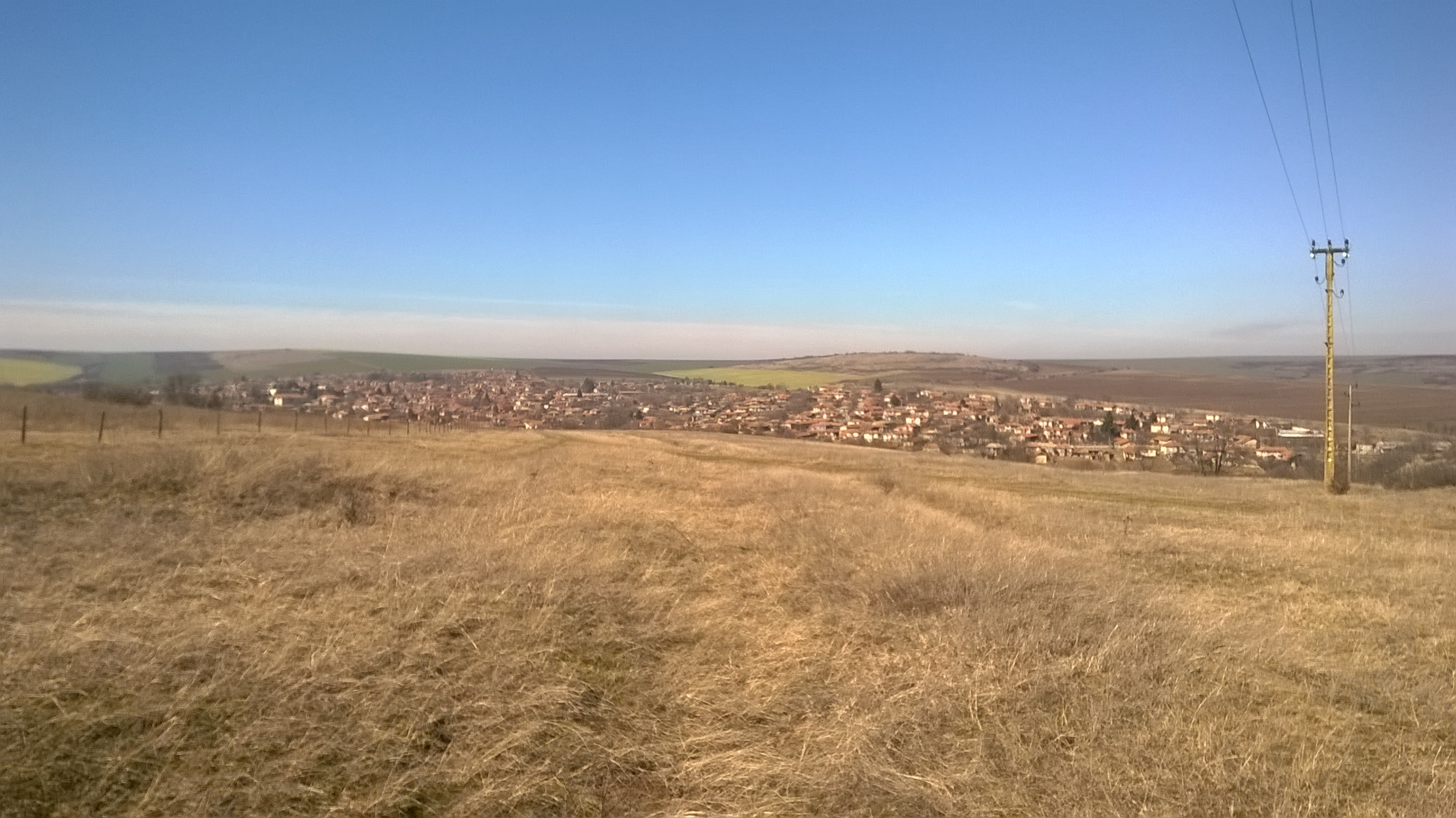
Polski Senovetz panorama

=== Location ===
Polski Senovets is located in the central part of the Danubian Plain. The village is 12 km (7.5 mi) away from Polski Trambesh, 37 km (23 mi) from Veliko Tarnovo, 4.4 km (2.7 mi) from the village of Stefan Stmabolovo, 4.4 km (2.7 mi) from the village of Petko Karavelovo and 3 km (1.9 mi) from the village of Ivancha.

Nearby places include Bratanevets to the weat, Beloopastritza to the north, and Oreshaka, the most fertile area, also to the north. Features in Polski Senovets are: the Greek road, Mechi Dol, Dolni livadi, the old vineyards, Pod bardo, Gornik, Kopotti, Dola.

=== Hydrography ===
There is a dam near the village and a river, River Gargalaka (also called River Polski Senovets).

=== Soil ===
The soil in the area is typical of the Danubian Plain, approximately 80% black soil and 20% forest soil.

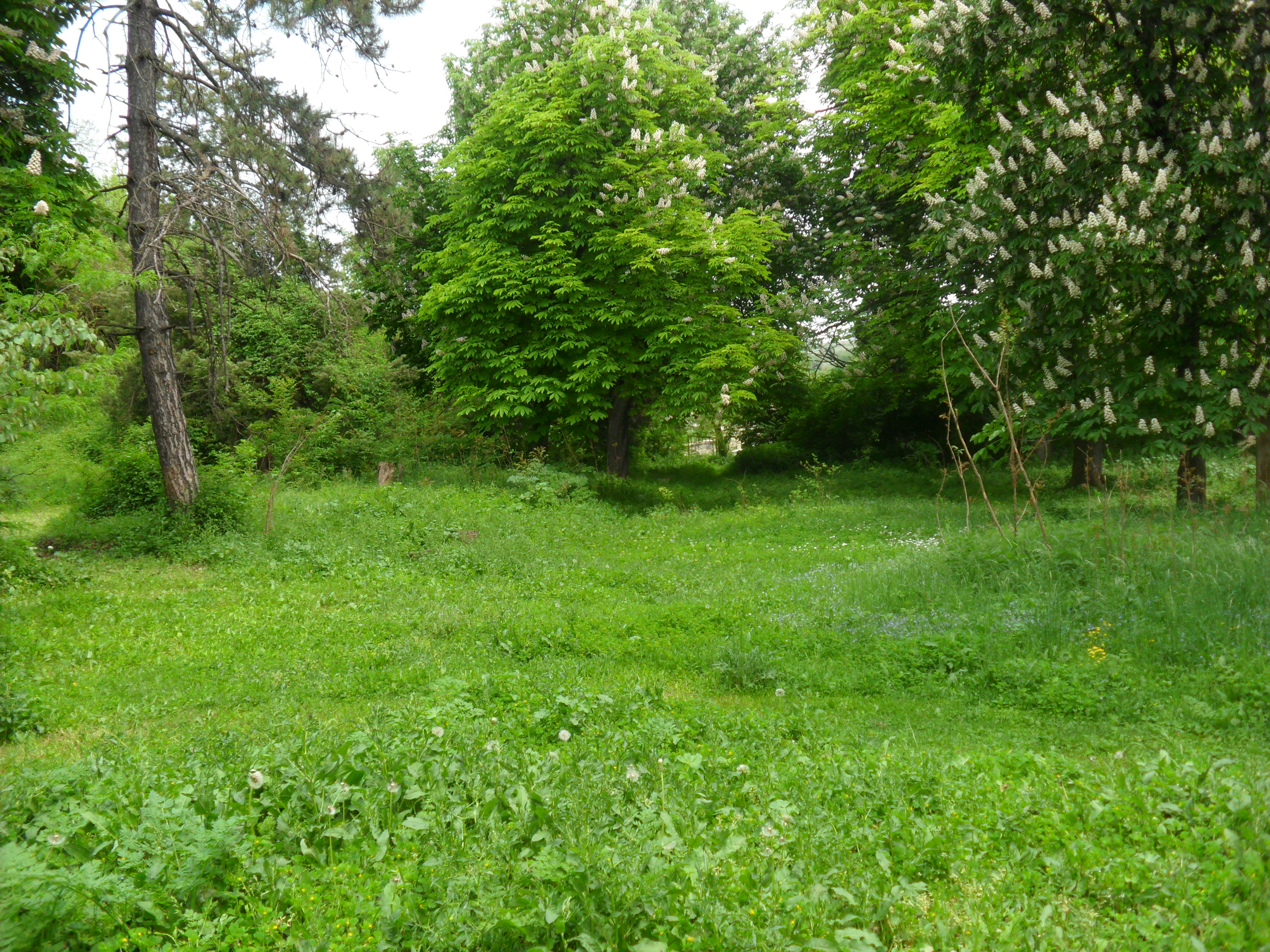
Park in Polski Senovets

=== Climate ===
The climate in Polski Senovets is continental. The temperature ranges from 28 °C (82 °F) in August to −4.5 °C (23.9 °F) in January.

== Flora and fauna ==
Trees in the area are mostly deciduous, with a smaller number of conifers. Lime, winter oak, hornbeam, and poplar are typical. Wildlife is that of the Danubian Plain, with rabbits, foxes, mice, hamsters and deer seen year-round.

== History ==
Polski Senovets was established in the 14th century following the unification of the surrounding neighborhoods Sarnitsa, Glogota, and Dunavliy Suvandzhikyoy. A document from 1618 records 74 Christian families and two Ottoman families, with 74 married men listed. The first church school in Polski Senovets opened in 1847. Sava Mihaylovsky of Turnovo is named as the teacher from 1854. In 1877 in Polski Senovec, also called Senovetss Poleki, there were 248 houses. The first mayor after the Ottoman rule, chosen in 1887, was Tasho Delimapinov. He was a representative of the conservative party. The first communication centre or Culture centre "Nadezhda 1883" (translated into English): Hope 1883. On May 1, 1895, a rally against the tithe law was held in Polski Senovec. From 1902 to 1926 the village had a branch of the Bulgarian Agricultural Bank. In 1911, the post office was established and the village had a telephone and telegraph connection. In 1912, a police station was opened and in 1919, the Consumer Cooperative "Saglasie" was established; its founders are Marin Yankov and Stefan Stefanov. In 1945, the village was electrified. Labor Cooperative Farm "Valko Chervenkov" was established in 1949. In 1959 Polski Senovets became the center of a new village municipality including the villages: Kutskina, Petko Karavelovo and Stefan Stambolovo.

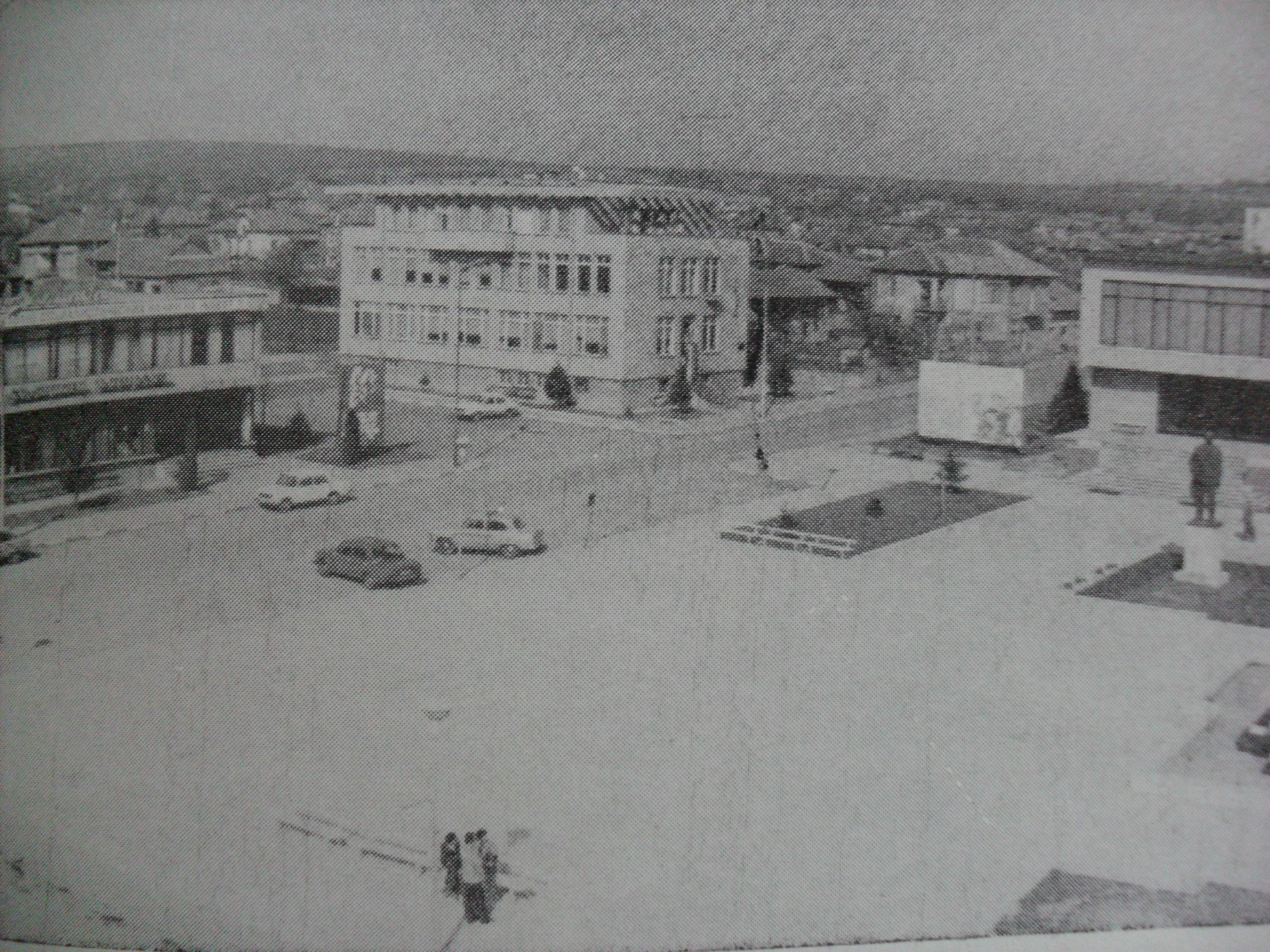

=== Republic of Bulgaria ===
As of 2016, the mayor is Yordan Myhaylov.

== Religion ==
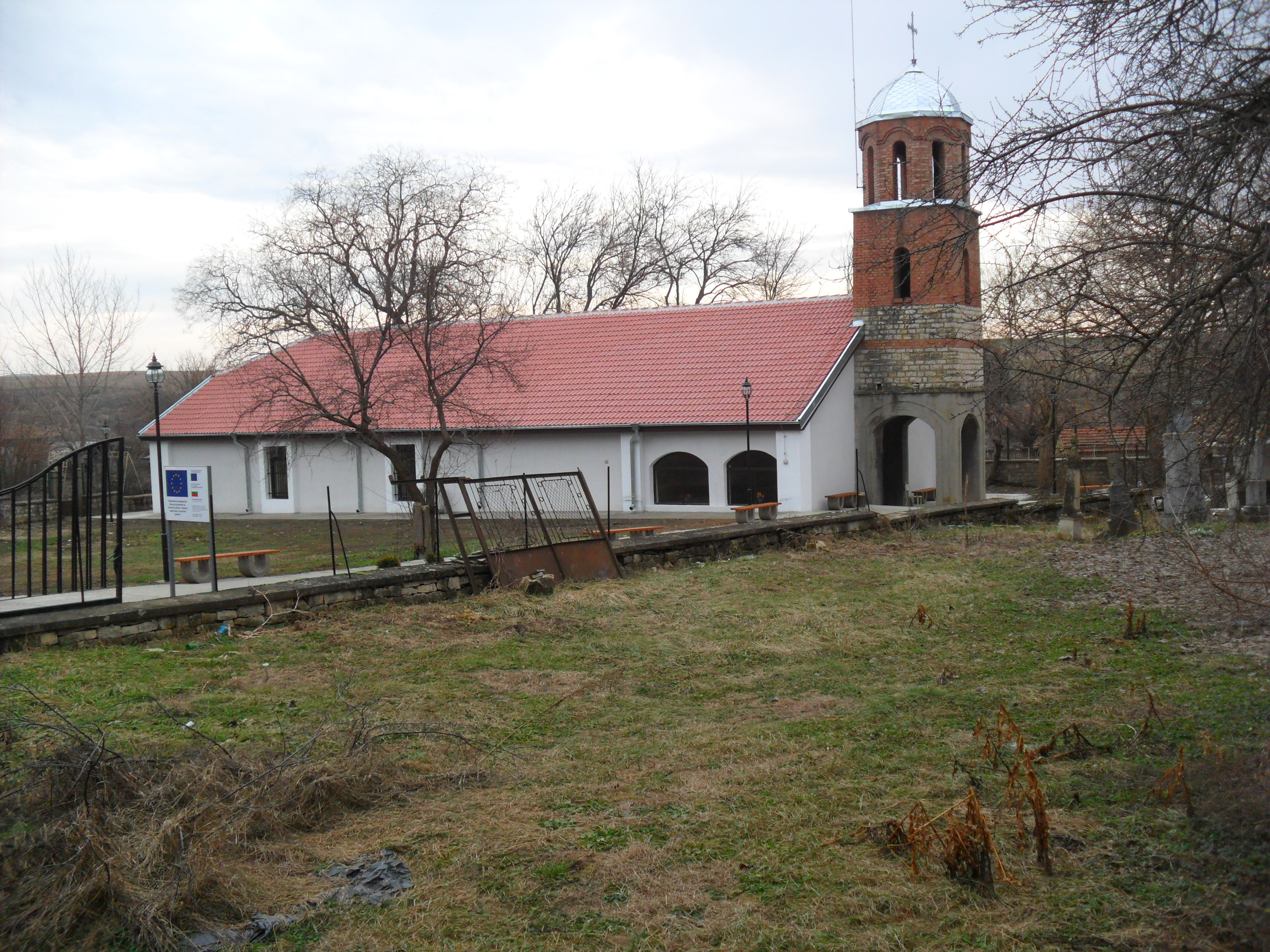
Orthodox Church, Sainte Theodore Stratilat

Over 90 per cent of the people in Polski Senovets are Orthodox Christians. In 1847, the Orthodox church Saint Theodore Stratilat was built.

== Administrative partition ==
Polski Senovets has several neighbourhoods: Tabak was the first neighbourhood; Gorna mahala is the largest and it was established around the 16th century with the largest Karaivanovi in the village; Dolna was established after the deportation of the Ottoman Turks.

== Transport ==
=== Automobile transport ===
The main road, E85, runs near Polski Senovets and connects the towns Rousse, Veliko Tarnovo and Stara Zagora.

=== Rail transport ===
In 1900, a railway was built between Rousse and Stara Zagora; it is 3 km (1.9 mi) from Polski Senovets.

== Sport ==
Sports Society Botev was established in the village in 1952. The volleyball team won the Village Spartakiada in 1965.

- FC Spartak Polski Senovets was established in the 1950s. The club played football (soccer) in Veliko Tarnovo`s Regional league.

== Gallery ==
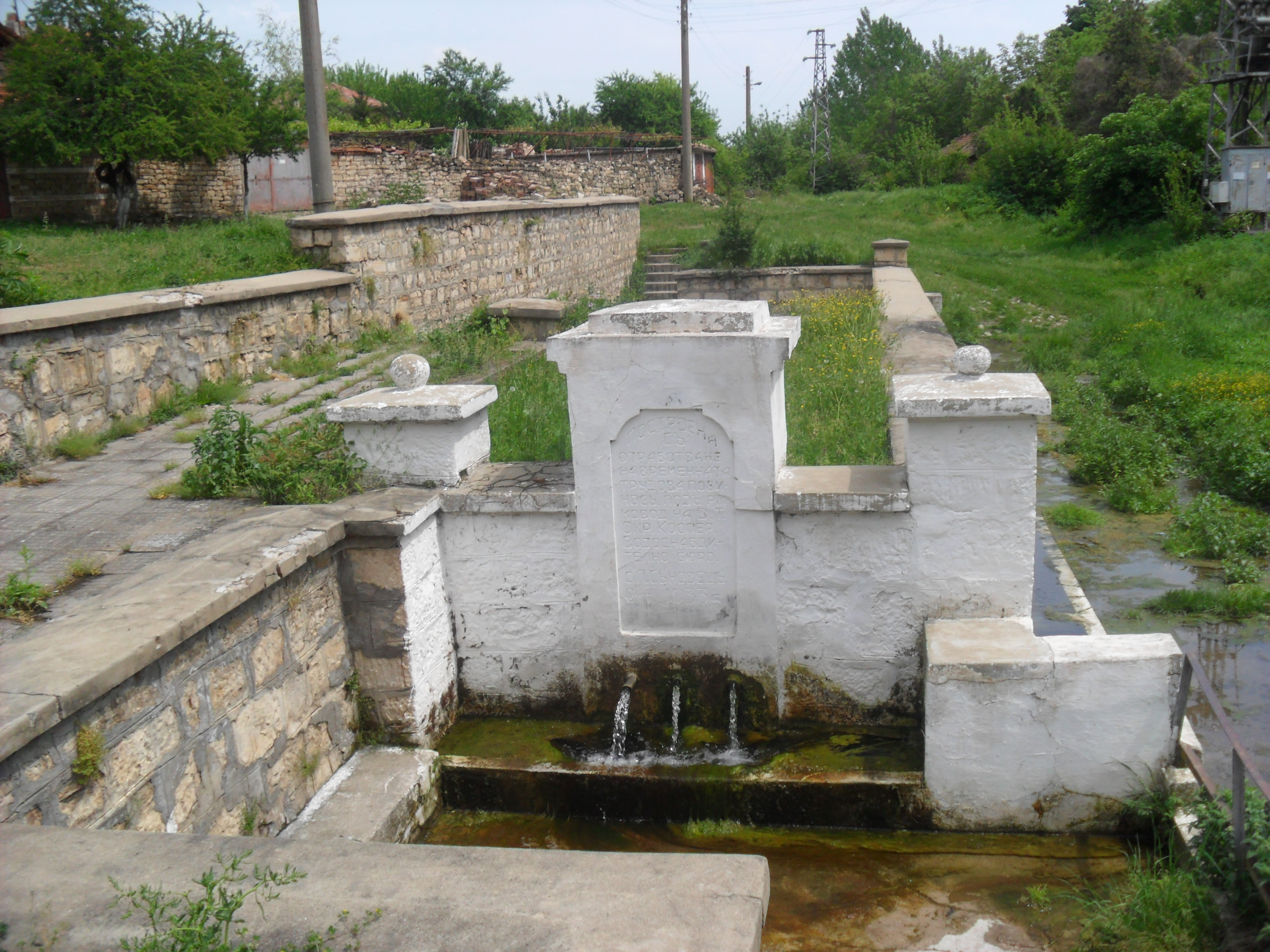
Fountain in Tabak mahala

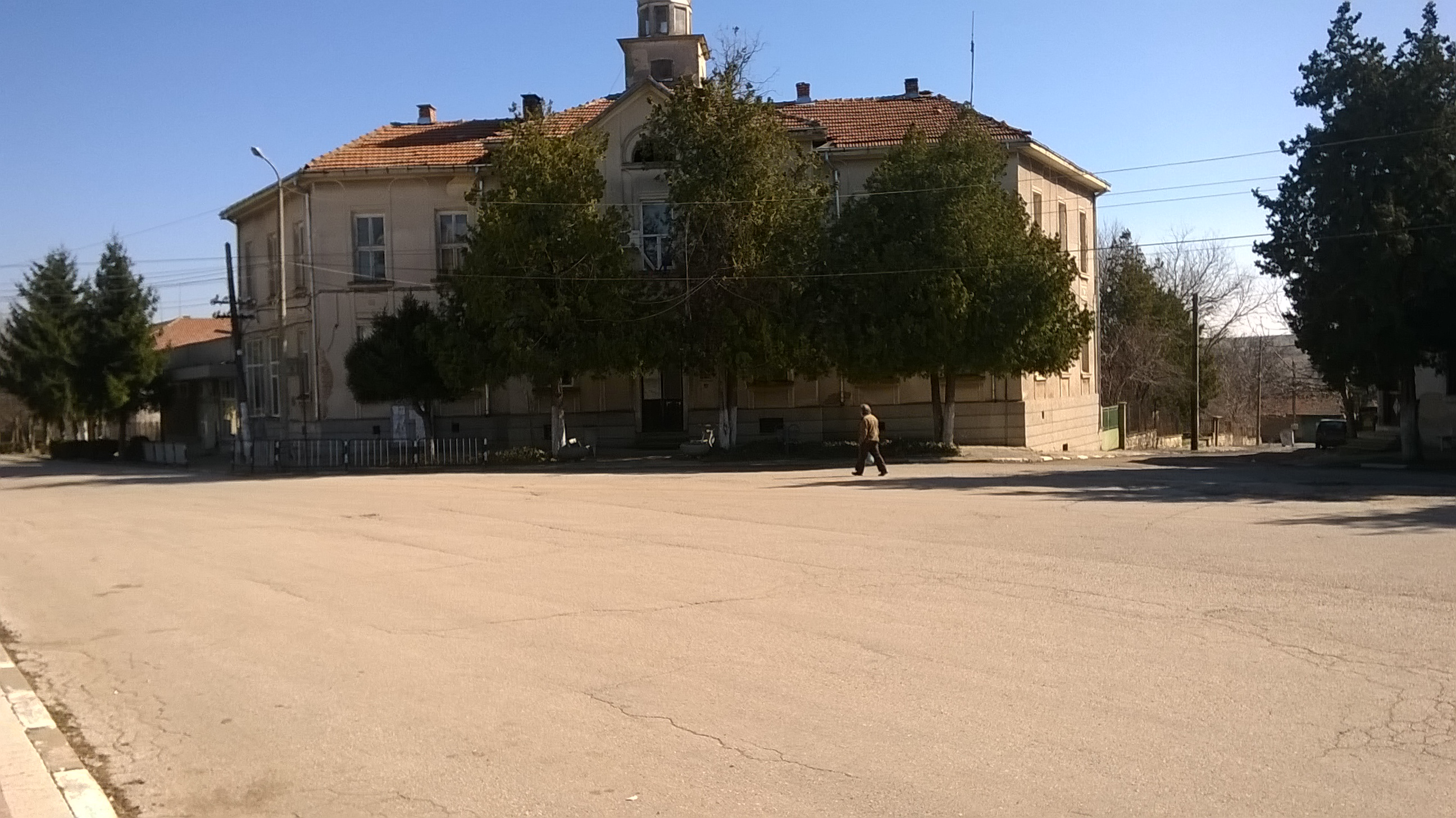
Town hall

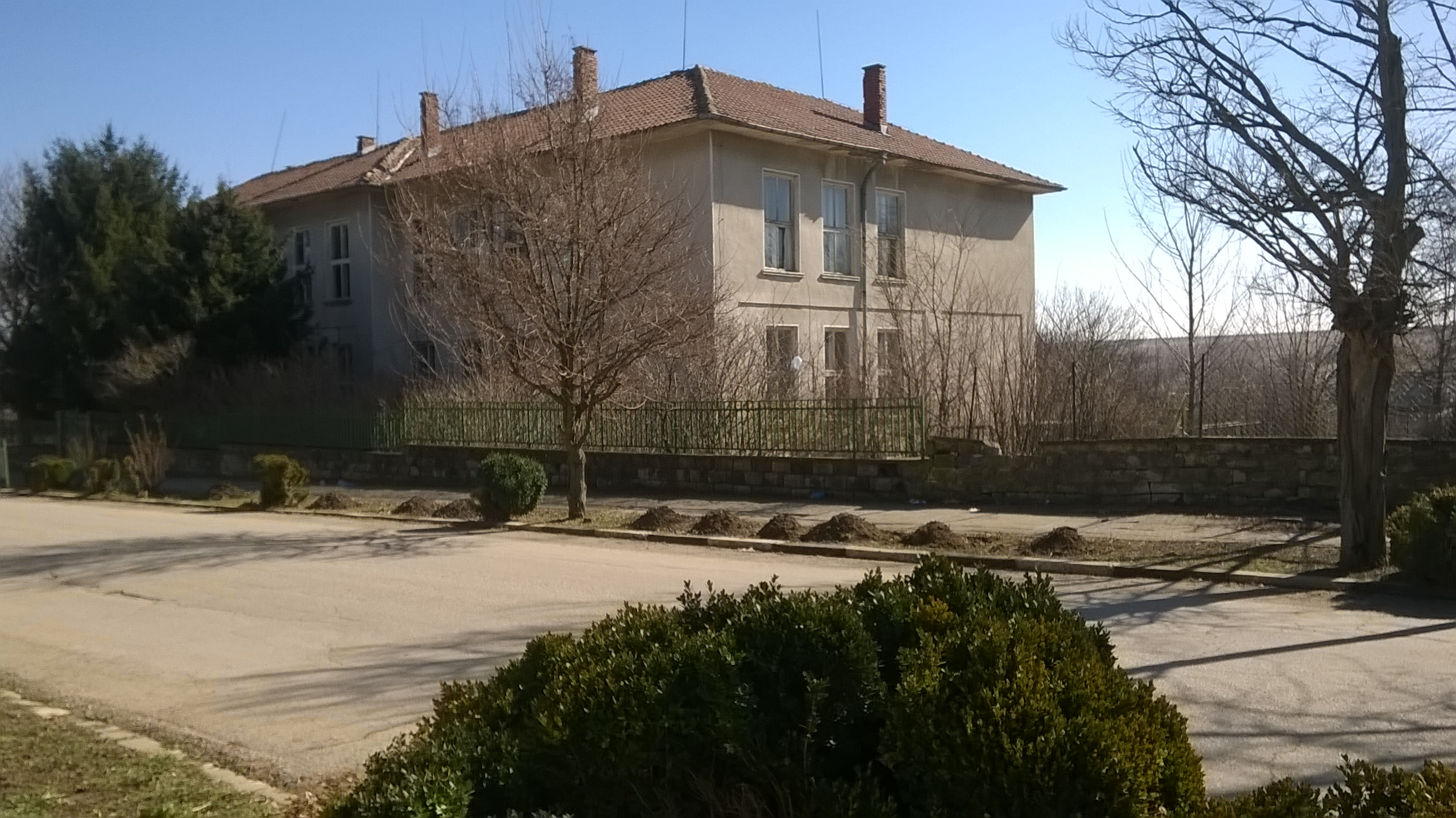
Nikola Vaptsarov`s School

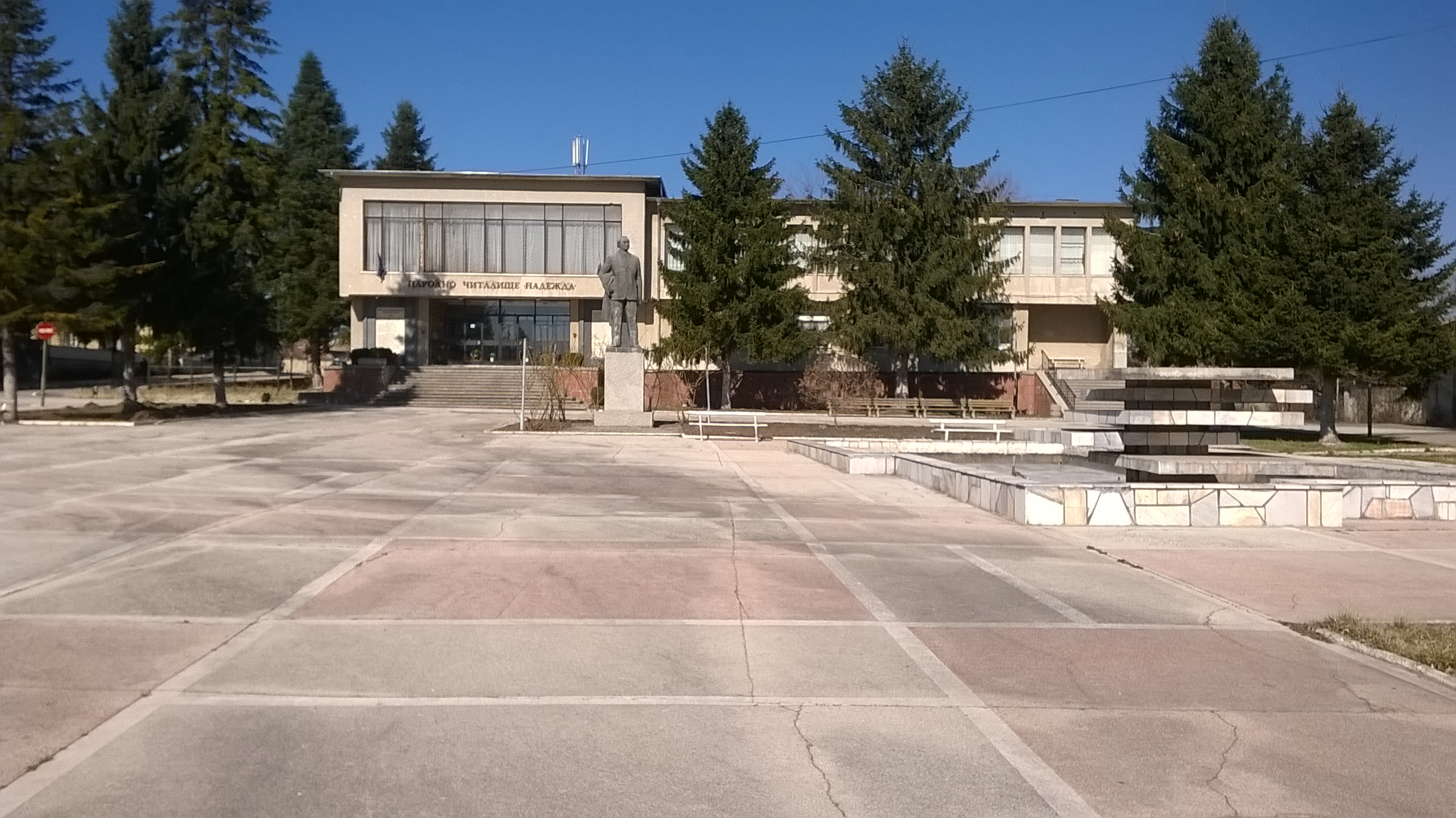
Culture centre "Nadezhda 1883"

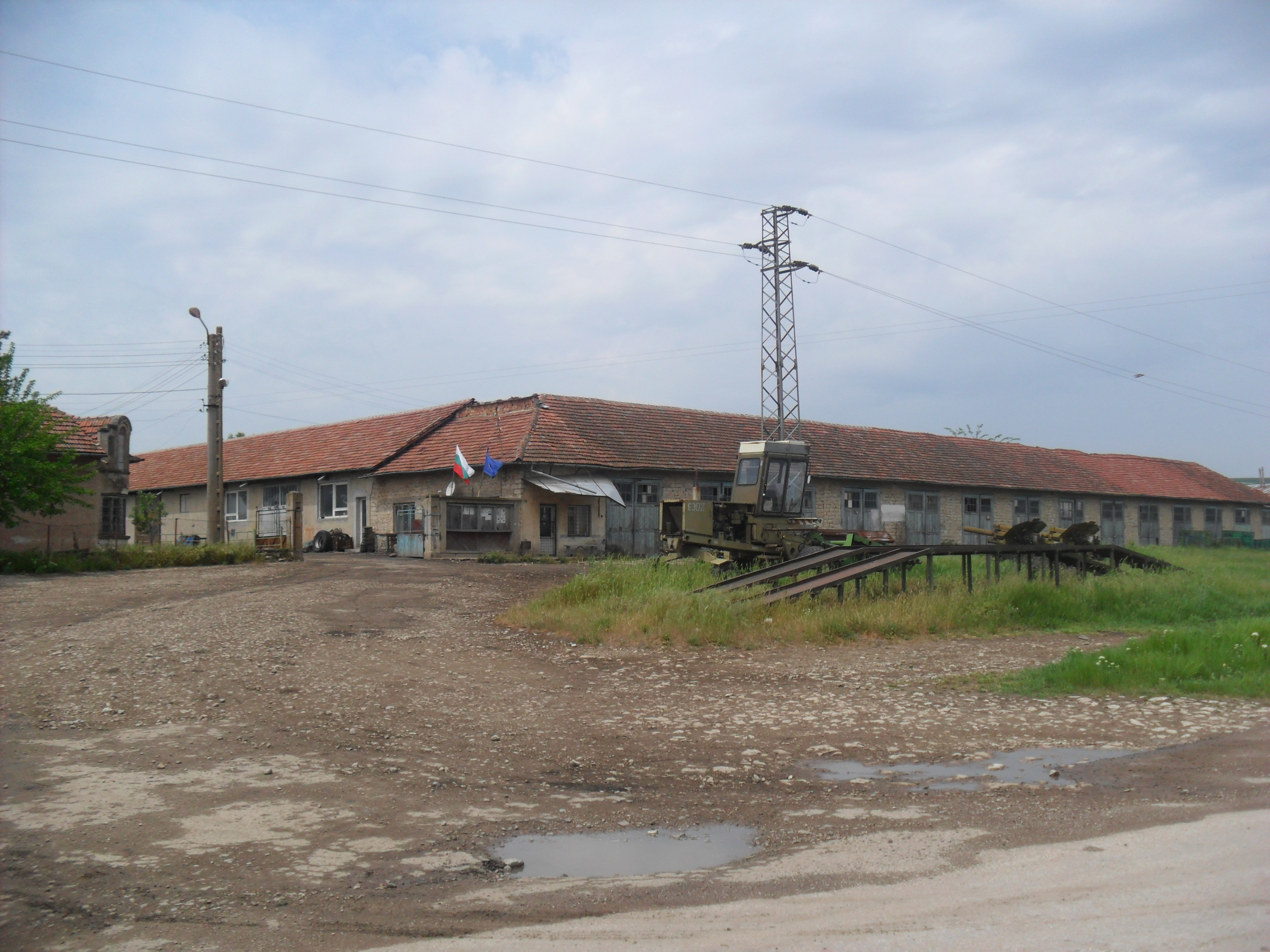
Labor-cooperative farm "Georgi Dimitrov"

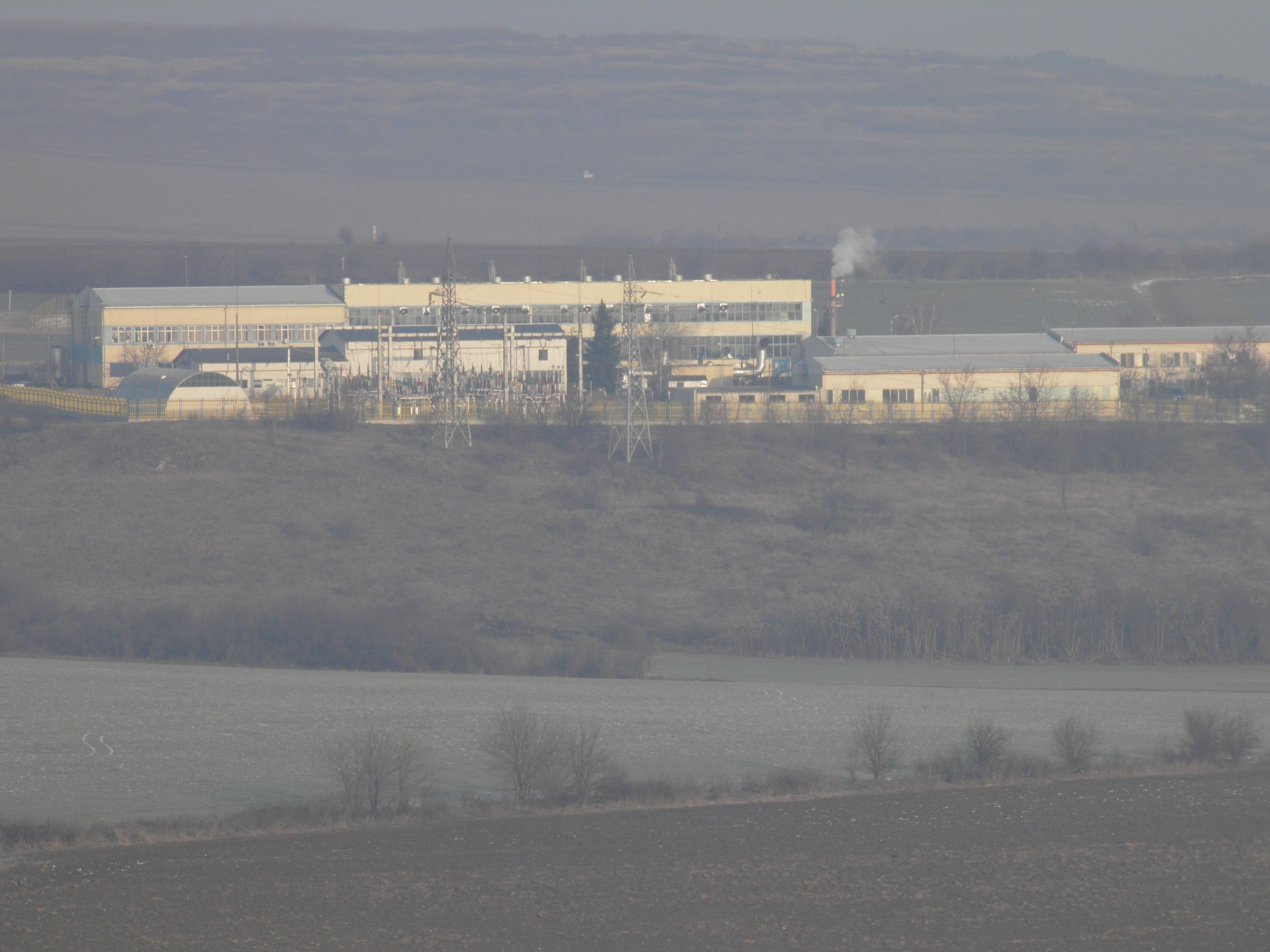
Electrical and gas distribution station

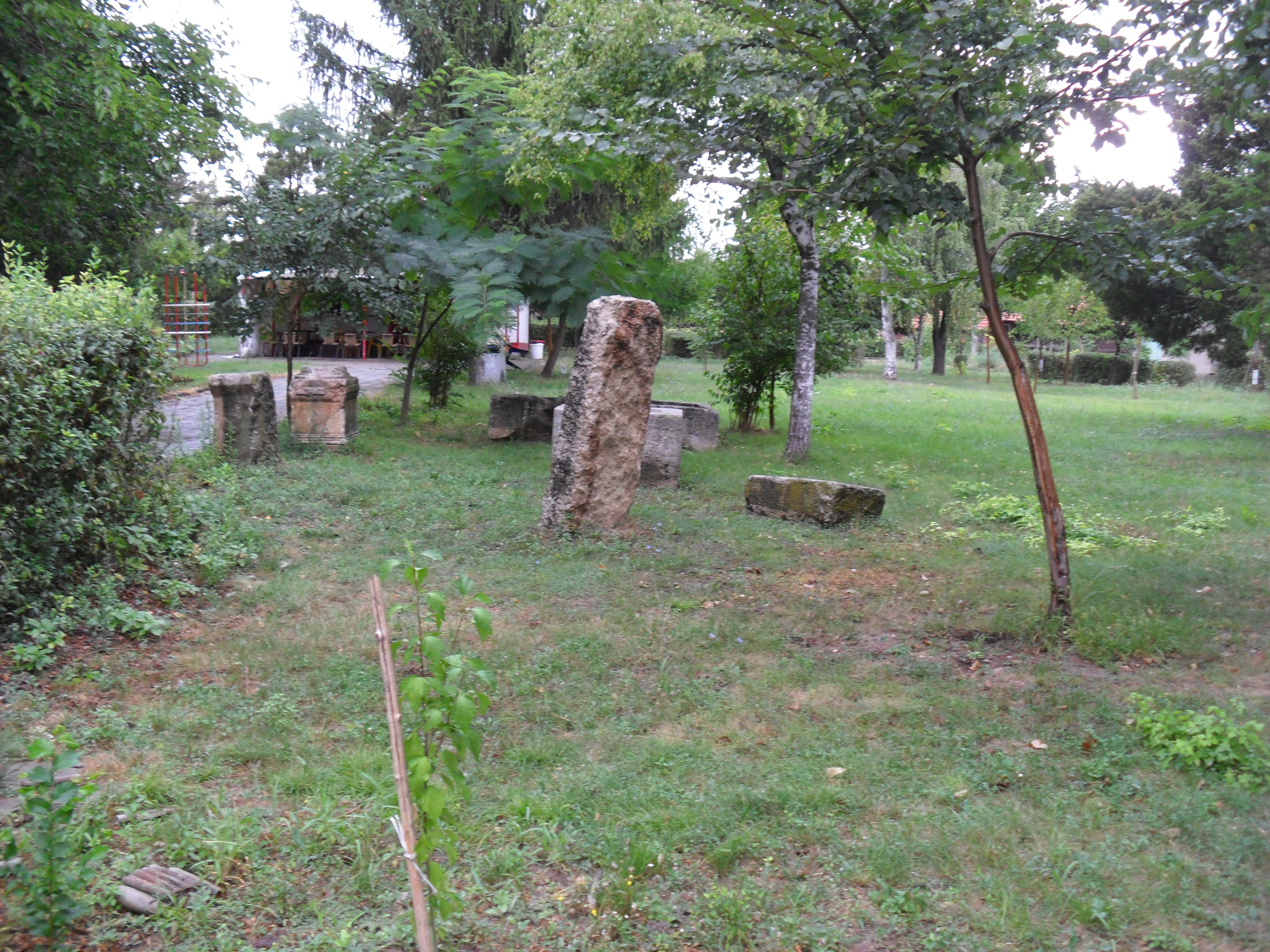
archaeological artifacts

== Sources ==
- Regional state archive – Veliko Tarnovo
- Polski Senovets – by Todor Lazarov(Полски Сеновец – Тодор Лазаров 1984 издателство "Отечествен фронт"(Bulgarian)) created with the help of Georgi Mihaylov, Bogdan Sultov Angel Subev, Kiril Popov.
- Доклади и научни съобщения от III национална научна конференция От регионалното към националното - нумизматика, сфрагистика, епиграфика и музейно дело на Исторически музей - Полски Тръмбеш, посветена на 65-годишнината на ст. н. с. д-р Христо Харитонов, 6-7. IX. 2009 г. Полски Тръмбеш
- Доклади и научни съобщения от IV национална научна конференция `От регионалното към националното - етнология, краезнание и музейно дело` на Историческия музей - Полски Тръмбеш посветена на 70-годишнината на доц. д-р Николай Колев и 80-годишнината на краеведа Рачо Илиев - Почетен гражданин на Полски Тръмбеш
- Page Folk "Nadezhda 1883"
- Map of Polski Trambesh
- Article on "Nadejda"
