= Klimentovo, Veliko Tarnovo Province =

Klimentovo
- Location within Bulgaria
- Coordinates: 43°22′00″N 25°36′00″E
- Country: Bulgaria
- District: Veliko Tarnovo
- Municipality: Polski Trambesh
- Separate populated place rights: 1992

Government
  - Mayor: Milko Minchev

Area
  - Total: 18 km^{2} (6.9 sq mi)

Population (2008)
  - Total: 895
  - Density: 50/km^{2} (130/sq mi)
- Time zone: UTC+2 (EET)
  - Summer (DST): UTC+3 (CEST)
- Postal code: 5183
- Area code: +359 6141
- Vehicle registration ID prefix: BT
- Website: http://www.klimentovo.bg

Klimentovo is a village situated in Central North Bulgaria. It is a part of Polski Trambesh Municipality, Veliko Tarnovo Province.
