= Orlovets =

Bulgarian mountain peak

Orlovets (Орловец)
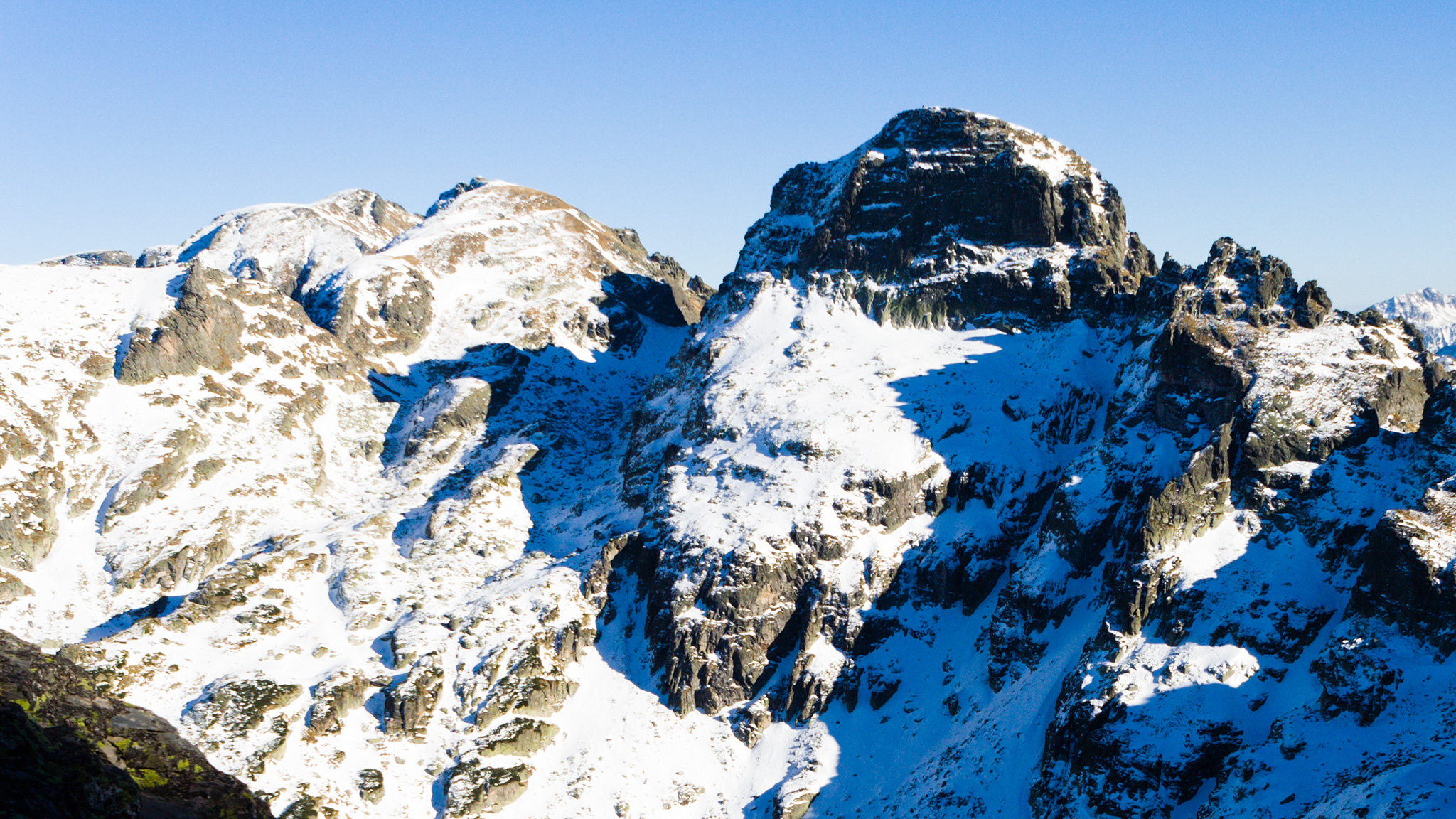
- Orlovets and Lovnitsa seen from Malyovitsa

Highest point
- Elevation: 2,686 m (8,812 ft)
- Coordinates: 42°10′19″N 23°22′54″E

Geography
- Location: Bulgaria
- Parent range: Rila Mountains

Orlovets (Bulgarian: Орловец) is a summit in the northwestern part of the Rila mountain range in southwestern Bulgaria reaching height of 2,686 m. It is located on the boundary between Rila National Park and Rila Monastery Nature Park, to the east of the major summit of Malyovitsa (2,729 m).

Orlovets is situated on the main orographic ridge of northwestern Rila west of the summit of Zlia Zab (2,678 m), linked through a narrow rocky saddle. On the southern face of the saddle a steep gully named the Blue Gully descends to the valley of the Rilska River some 1,200 m below. To the west of Orlovets the ridge reaches the summit of Eleni Vrah (2,654 m) through a jugged rocky saddle. This part of the main ridge has southern slopes, furrowed by gullies, where there are rockfalls, avalanches and torrential waters flows, known collectively of Zlite Pototsi, meaning "The Evil Streams".

The northern slopes of Orlovets are rocky. They form the limit of the Malyovitsa valley from the southeast, descending steeply to the valley. The southern slopes of the summit facing the valley of the Rilska River are more oblique in the upper section with grassy area.

Access by casual tourists is difficult, especially from the west; the easier trail is from the east.

The walls of Orlovets are important sites for alpine climbing. The northwestern wall is about 100 m high, built of granite and pegmatite slate; in some sections there are unstable rock blocks. It was climbed for the first time in 1935 by the German climbers Hermann Hund and Toni Wiedemann. The south wall is very good for climbing, but is rarely frequented due to the more inconvenient access.
