= Topolovgrad Municipality =

Topolovgrad Municipality Община Тополовград
- Municipality
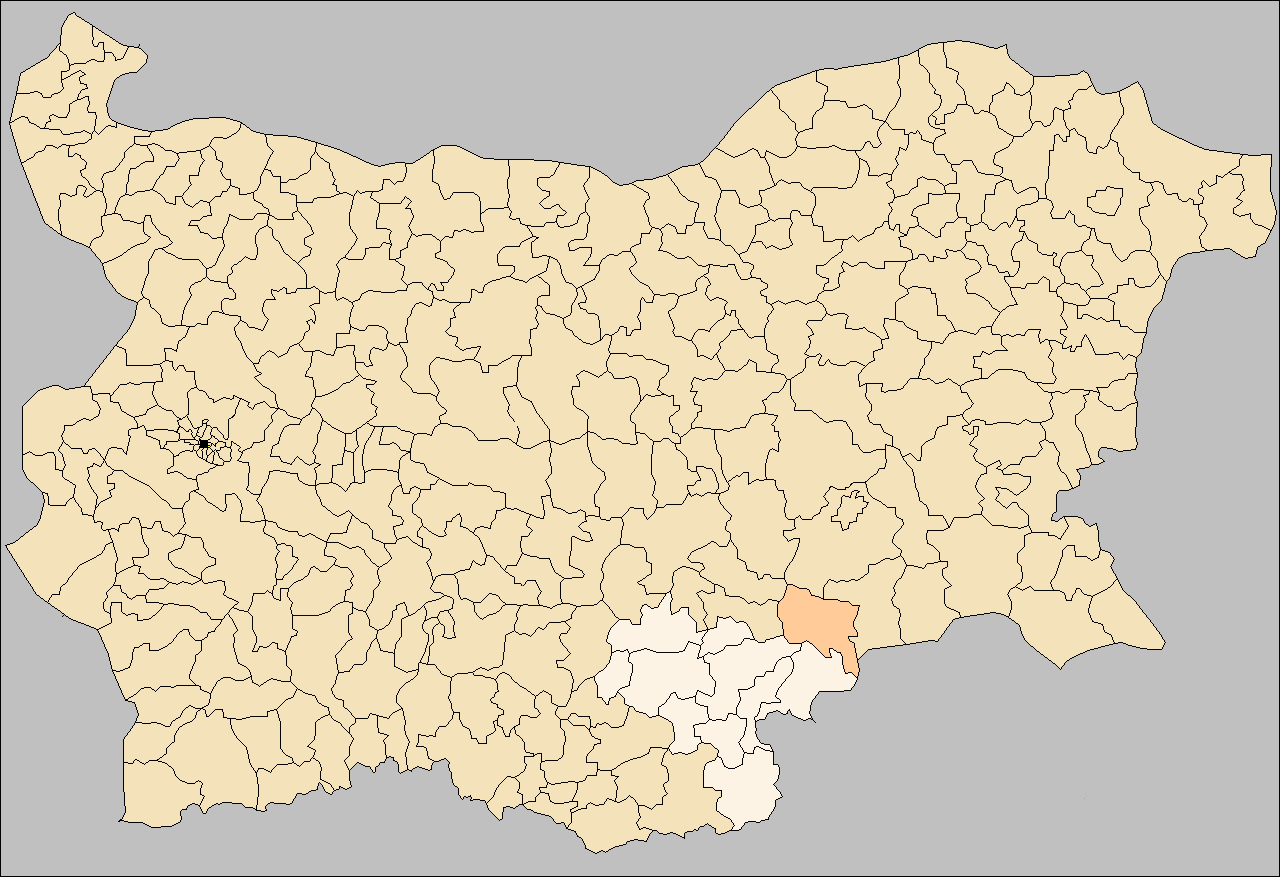
- Topolovgrad Municipality within Bulgaria and Haskovo Province.
- Coordinates: 42°5′N 26°20′E
- Country: Bulgaria
- Province (Oblast): Haskovo
- Admin. centre (Obshtinski tsentar): Topolovgrad

Area
  - Total: 710.9 km^{2} (274.5 sq mi)

Population (February 2011)
  - Total: 11,681
  - Density: 16.43/km^{2} (42.56/sq mi)
- Time zone: UTC+2 (EET)
  - Summer (DST): UTC+3 (EEST)
- Website: www.topolovgrad.net

Topolovgrad Municipality (Bulgarian: Община Тополовград) is a municipality (obshtina) in Haskovo Province, Southeastern Bulgaria. It is named after its administrative centre - the town of Topolovgrad.

The municipality has a territory of 710.9 km² with a population of 11,681 inhabitants, according to the 2011 census. The municipality is located mostly on the right bank of the Tundzha river, with the Sakar mountain taking up a large part of its territory. Topolovgrad municipality has a short border with Turkey to the south.

== Settlements ==
Topolovgrad Municipality includes the following 21 places (towns are shown in bold):

Town/Village	Cyrillic	Population (February 2011)
**Topolovgrad**	**Тополовград**	5,588
Balgarska polyana	Българска поляна	189
Vladimirovo	Владимирово	35
Dobroselets	Доброселец	138
Kamenna reka	Каменна река	91
Kapitan Petko voyvoda	Капитан Петко войвода	151
Knyazhevo	Княжево	357
Mramor	Мрамор	427
Oreshnik	Орешник	577
Orlov dol	Орлов дол	485
Planinovo	Планиново	38
Prisadets	Присадец	9
Radovets	Радовец	718
Sakartsi	Сакарци	11
Svetlina	Светлина	152
Sinapovo	Синапово	537
Srem	Срем	459
Ustrem	Устрем	999
Filipovo	Филипово	14
Hlyabovo	Хлябово	656
Chukarovo	Чукарово	50
Total		11,681

== Demography ==
The following table shows the change of the population during the last four decades.

Topolovgrad Municipality
**Year**	1975	1985	1992	**2001**	2005	2007	2009	**2011**
**Population**	23,910	20,986	19,075	15,414	13,997	13,265	12,479	11,681
Sources: Census 2001, Census 2011, „pop-stat.mashke.org“,

=== Ethnic composition ===
According to the 2011 census, among those who answered the optional question on ethnic identification, the ethnic composition of the municipality was the following:

Ethnic group	Population	Percentage
Bulgarians	10,049	90.3%
Turks	27	0.2%
Roma (Gypsy)	982	8.8%
Others	41	0.4%
Undeclared	30	0.3%

==== Religion ====
According to the latest Bulgarian census of 2011, the religious composition, among those who answered the optional question on religious identification, was the following:

Religious composition of Topolovgrad Municipality
Orthodox Christianity	90.1%
Catholicism	0.6%
Protestantism	0.7%
Islam	0.3%
No religion	3.8%
Prefer not to answer, others and indefinable	4.5%

== See also ==
- Provinces of Bulgaria
- Municipalities of Bulgaria
- List of cities and towns in Bulgaria
