= Manastirski Heights =

- Bulgarian: Манастирски възвишения
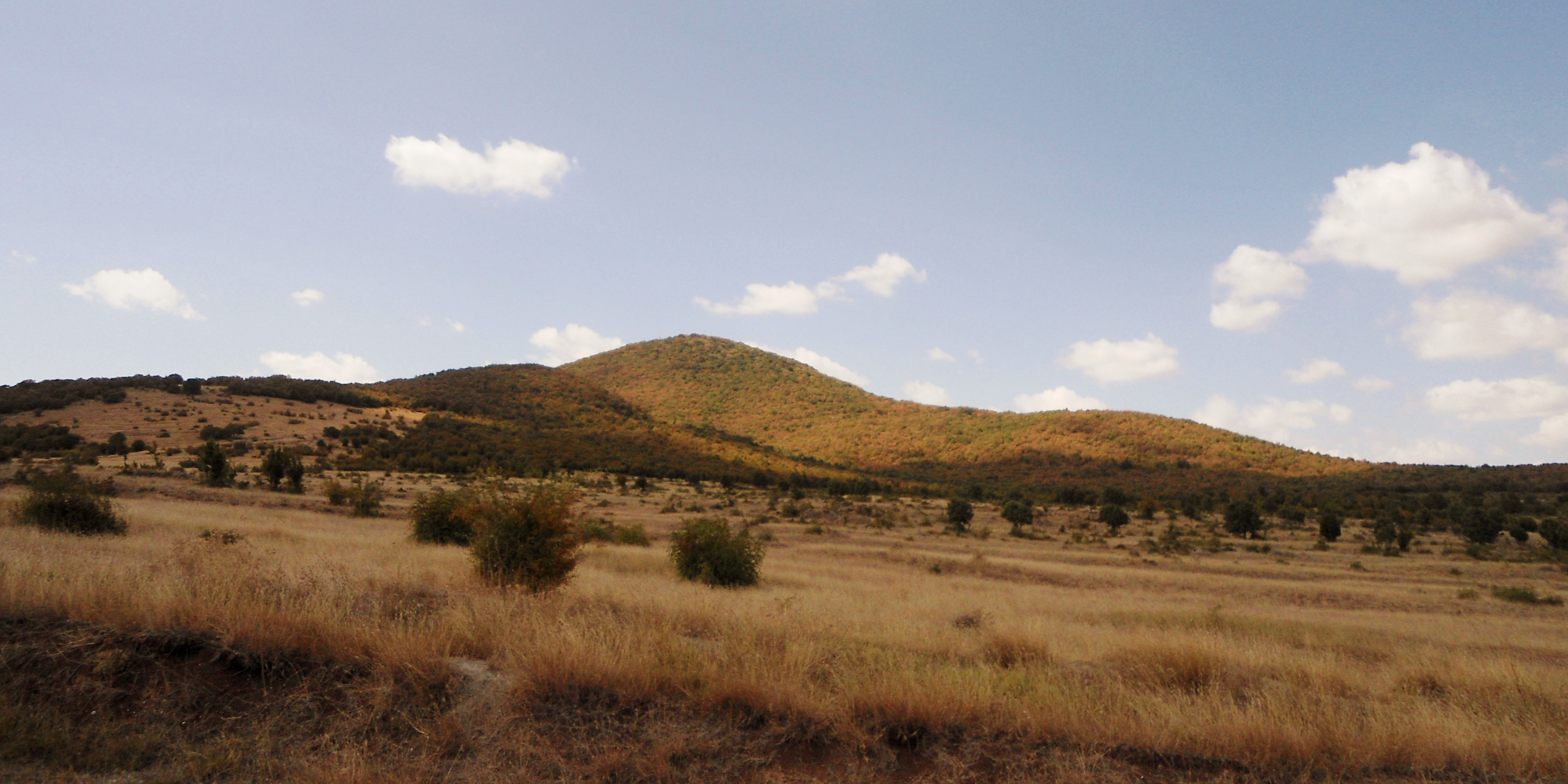

Highest point
- Peak: Gradishte
- Elevation: 600 m (2,000 ft)
- Coordinates: 42°13′15.6″N 26°20′31.2″E

Dimensions
- Length: 30 km (19 mi) west-east
- Width: 15 km (9.3 mi) north-south

Geography
- Location within Bulgaria
- Country: Bulgaria

Manastirski Heights (Bulgarian: Манастирски възвишения) are a hilly ridge in southeastern Bulgaria. Administratively, they lie in Haskovo, Stara Zagora and Yambol Provinces.

The heights are situated between the Upper Thracian Plain to the west and the Elhovo Field to the east. To the north are the Svetiiliyski Heights and to the south several low hills link them with the Sakar mountain range. The Manastirski Heights span some 30 km from west–southwest to east–northeast. The width varies from 15 km in the west to 5 km in the east. The western and southwestern part of the ridge consists of low-lying hills and the higher eastern area is dominated by two clearly defined dome-shapes elevations, separated by a flat saddle. The western elevation is Gradishte (600 m), situated about 1.2 km northwest of the village of Golyam Manastir, and is the highest point of the Manastirski Heights. They are built up of gabbro and crystalline schists. North of the heights, at the village of Krumovo, there is a deposit of iron ore.

The climate is transitional continental with Mediterranean influence. The ridge is drained by several small tributaries of the Ovcharitsa and Sokolitsa, both left tributaries of the Sazliyka to the west, as well as the rivers Kalnitsa and Sinapovska reka of the Tundzha basin. The soils are cinnamon forest soils. The higher areas are covered with sparse deciduous forests and at lower elevations are extensive pastures, favourable for livestock breeding.

There are 14 villages on the heights and their foothills: Vladimirovo, General Toshevo, Golyam Manastir, Drama, Kamenna reka, Malak Manastir, Matsa, Miladinovtsi, Ovchi Kladenets, Orlov dol, Polski Gradets, Pchela, Svetlina and Skalitsa. There are three roads from the national network running through the Manastirski Heights and their foothills: a 7.7 km stretch of the second class II-55 road Debelets–Nova Zagora–Svilengrad passes through their westernmost reaches between Polski Gradets and Madrets, a 14 km section of the third class III-536 road Yambol–Skalitsa–Matsa runs along the northwestern foothills between Skalitsa and Matsa, and a 13.5 km section of the third class III-559 road Polski Gradets–Topolovgrad–Ustrem is located in the southern parts of the ridge.

== Gallery ==
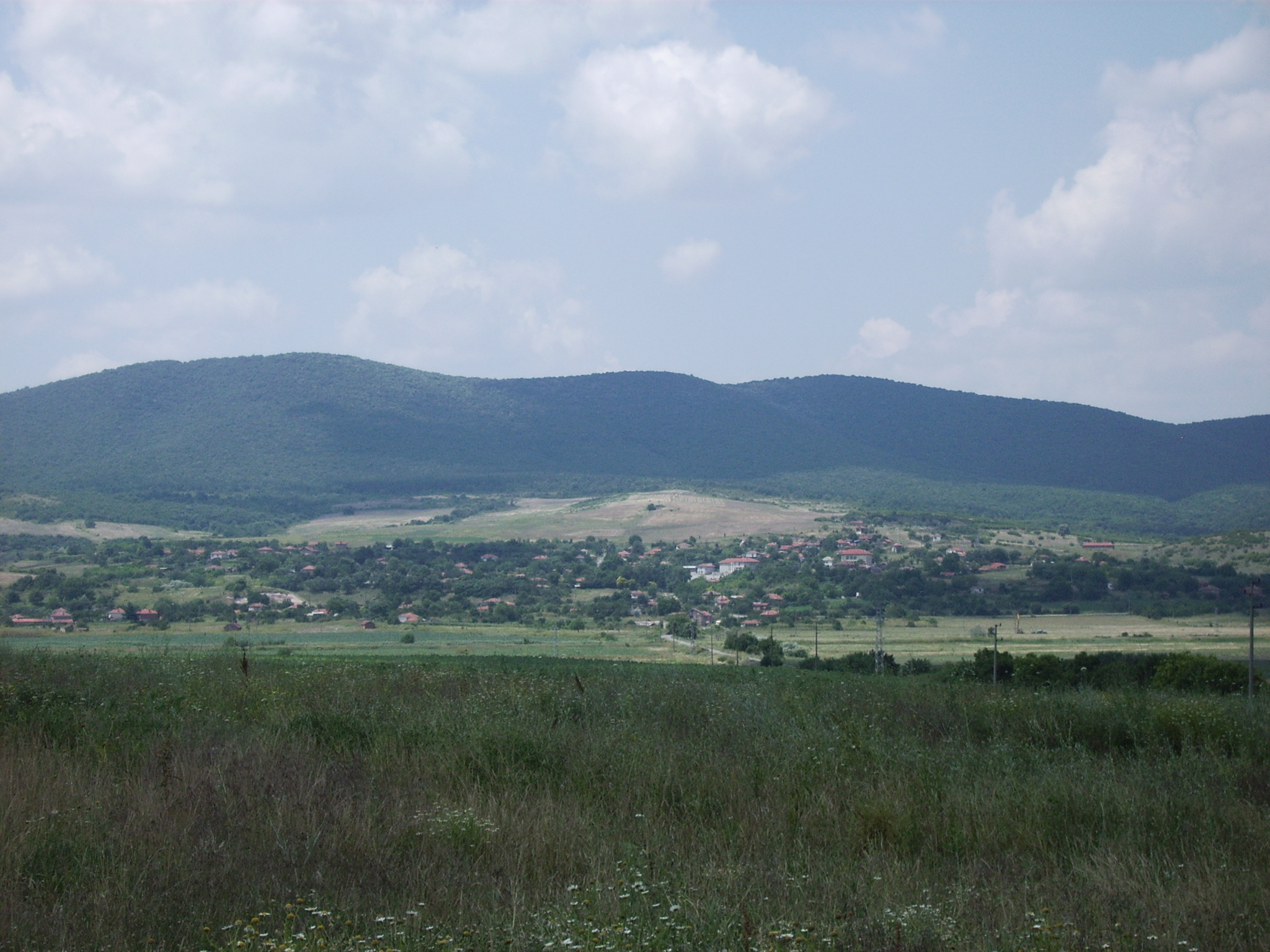
Manastirski Heights at Drama

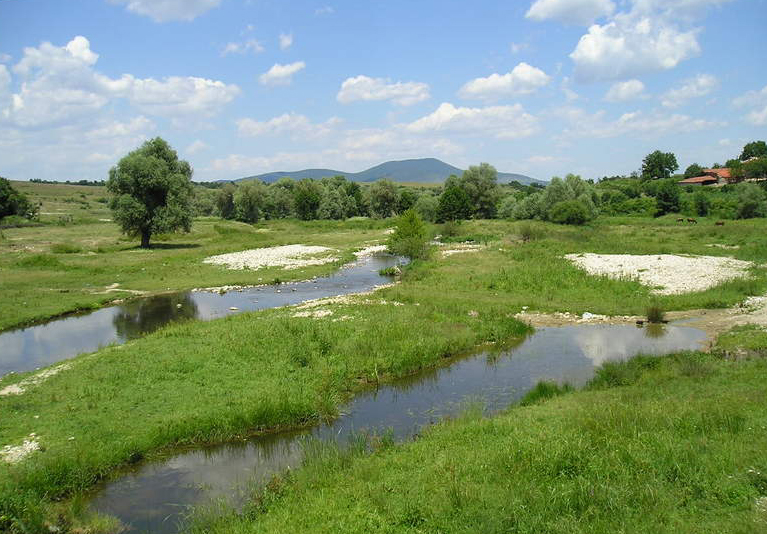
A distant view from Topolovgrad

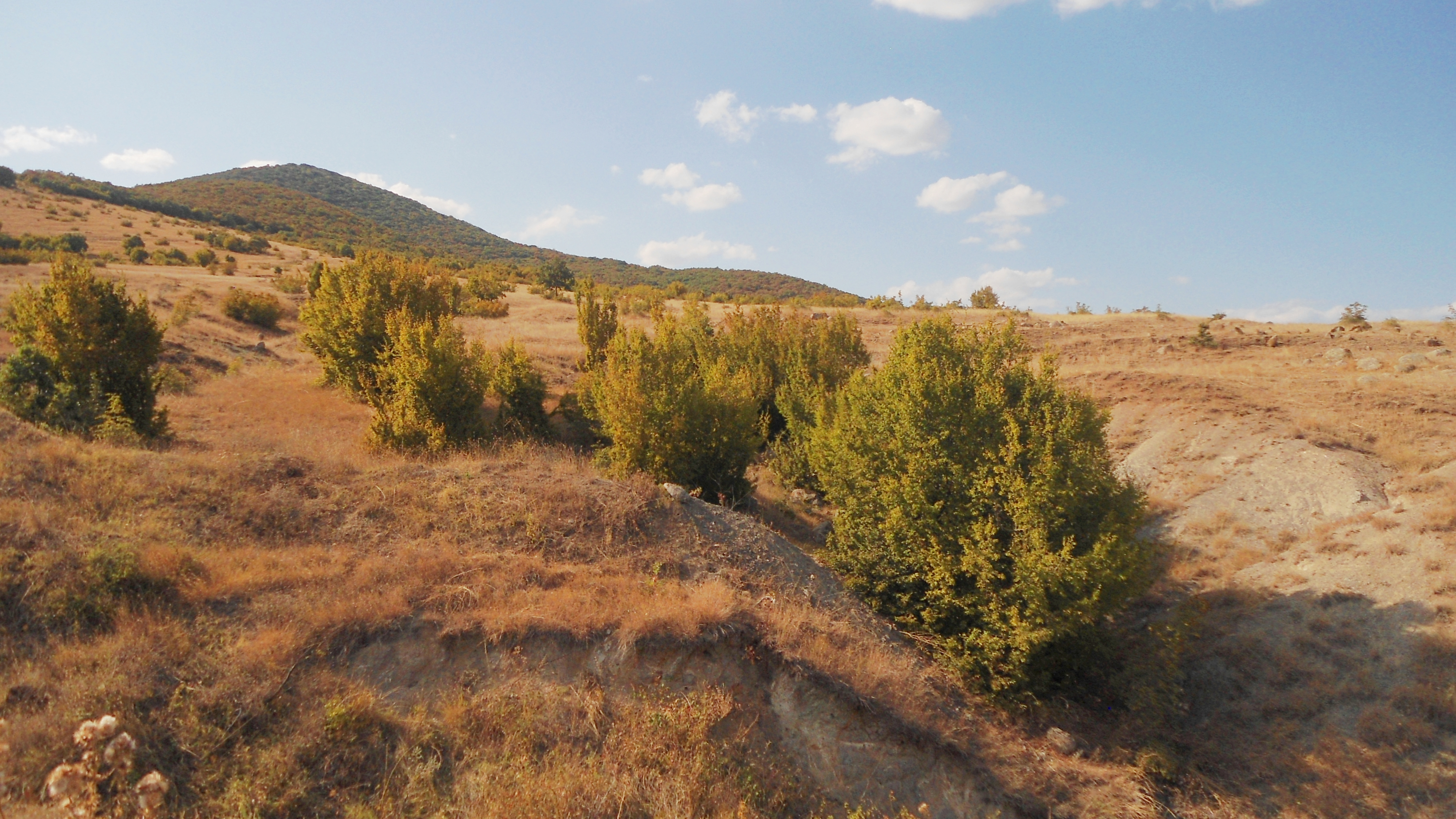
Oriental hornbeam (Carpinus orientalis)
