= Knyazevo =

Knyazevo may refer to the following places in Russia:

- Knyazevo, Arkhangelsky District, Republic of Bashkortostan
- Knyazevo, Ufa, Republic of Bashkortostan
- Knyazevo, Vologodsky District, Vologda Oblast
- Knyazevo, Gryazovetsky District, Vologda Oblast
- Knyazevo, Voronezh Oblast

== See also ==
- Knyazhevo (disambiguation)
