= Sinapovska reka =

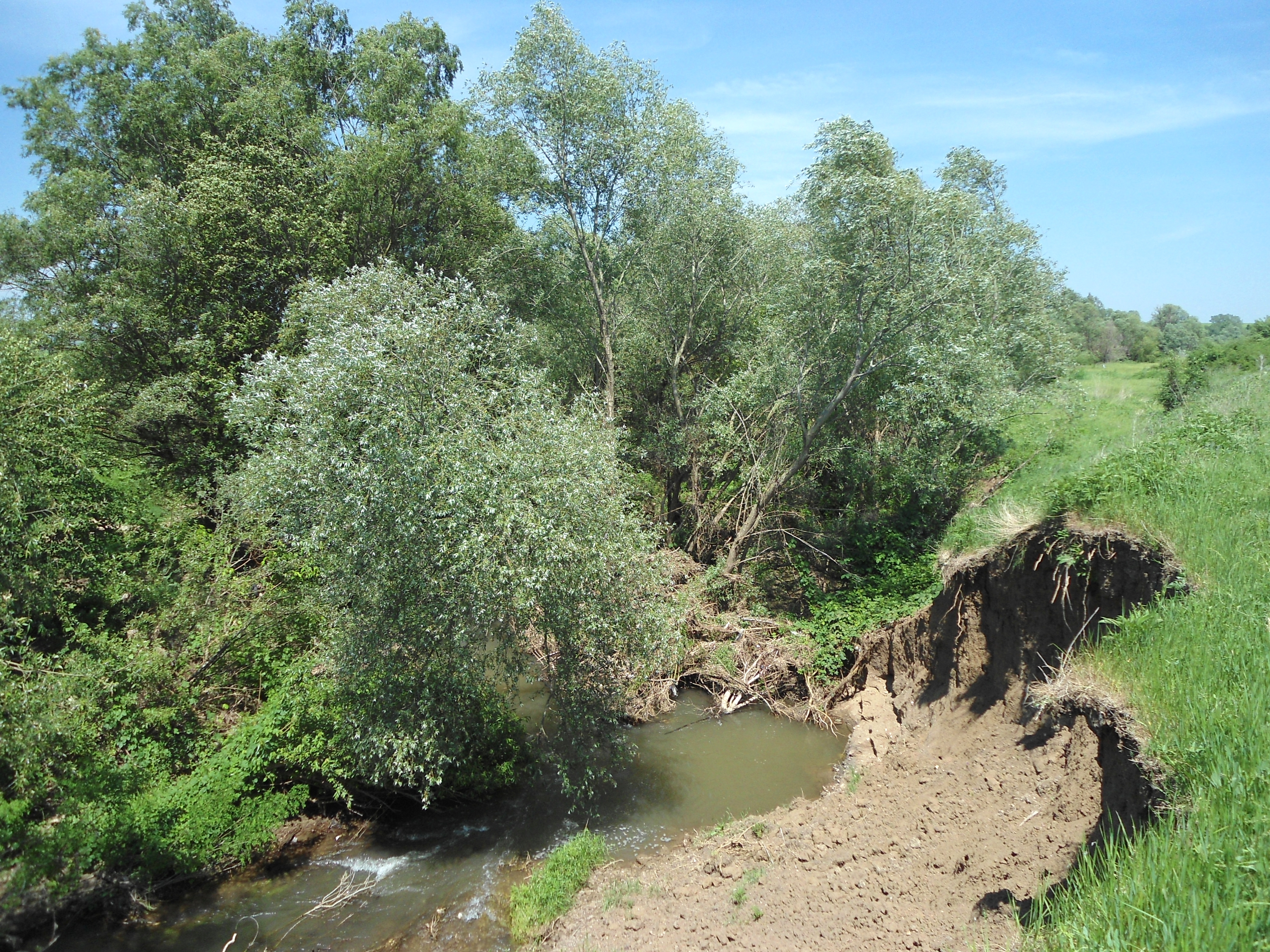

Location
- Country: Bulgaria

Physical characteristics
- Source
  - location: N of Vishegrad, Sakar
  - coordinates: 42°1′9.84″N 26°19′36.12″E
  - elevation: 574 m (1,883 ft)
- Mouth
  - location: Tundzha
  - coordinates: 42°7′12″N 26°30′52.92″E
  - elevation: 96 m (315 ft)
- Length: 50 km (31 mi)
- Basin size: 871 km^{2} (336 sq mi)

Basin features
- Progression: Tundzha→ Maritsa

The Sinapovska reka (Bulgarian: Синаповска река) is a river in southern Bulgaria, a right tributary of the river Tundzha of the Maritsa drainage, with a length of 50 km.

The river takes its source under the name Golyamata reka at an altitude of 574 m in the small Sakar mountain range, some 3 km north of its highest summit Vishegrad (856 m). It initially flows in direction northwest and then northeast in a narrow valley. At the village of Dobroselets the river changes direction first to the east and then to the southeast, flowing between the northern slopes of Sakar in the south and the southern slopes of the Manastirski Heights to the north. In this section its valley significantly widens and has an asymmetrical profile with steeper right (southern) slopes. After the village of Sinapovo, it enters the southwestern part of the Elhovo Field. The Sinapovska reka flows into the Tundzha at an altitude of 96 m one kilometer northeast of the village of Knyazhevo.

Its drainage basin covers a territory of 871 km^{2} or 10.33% of the Tundzha's total. Its largest tributary the Kalnitsa (72 km) is longer than the Sinapovska reka itself.

The Sinapovska reka has predominantly rain feed with high water in autumn and winter. The average annual flow is at Sinapovo is 1.3 m^{3}/s.

The river flows entirely in Haskovo Province. There are three settlements along its course, the villages of Dobroselets, Chukarovo and Sinapovo in Topolovgrad Municipality. Its waters are utilised for irrigation.
