= Knyazhevo =

Knyazhevo may refer to:

== Places in Bulgaria ==
- Knyazhevo, Sofia, a neighbourhood of Sofia
- Knyazhevo, Haskovo Province, a village

== Places in Russia ==
- Knyazhevo, Nikolsky District, Vologda Oblast
- Knyazhevo, Sokolsky District, Vologda Oblast
- Knyazhevo, Vologodsky District, Vologda Oblast

== See also ==
- Knyazevo (disambiguation)
