= Sakar (mountain) =

Mountain range in Bulgaria

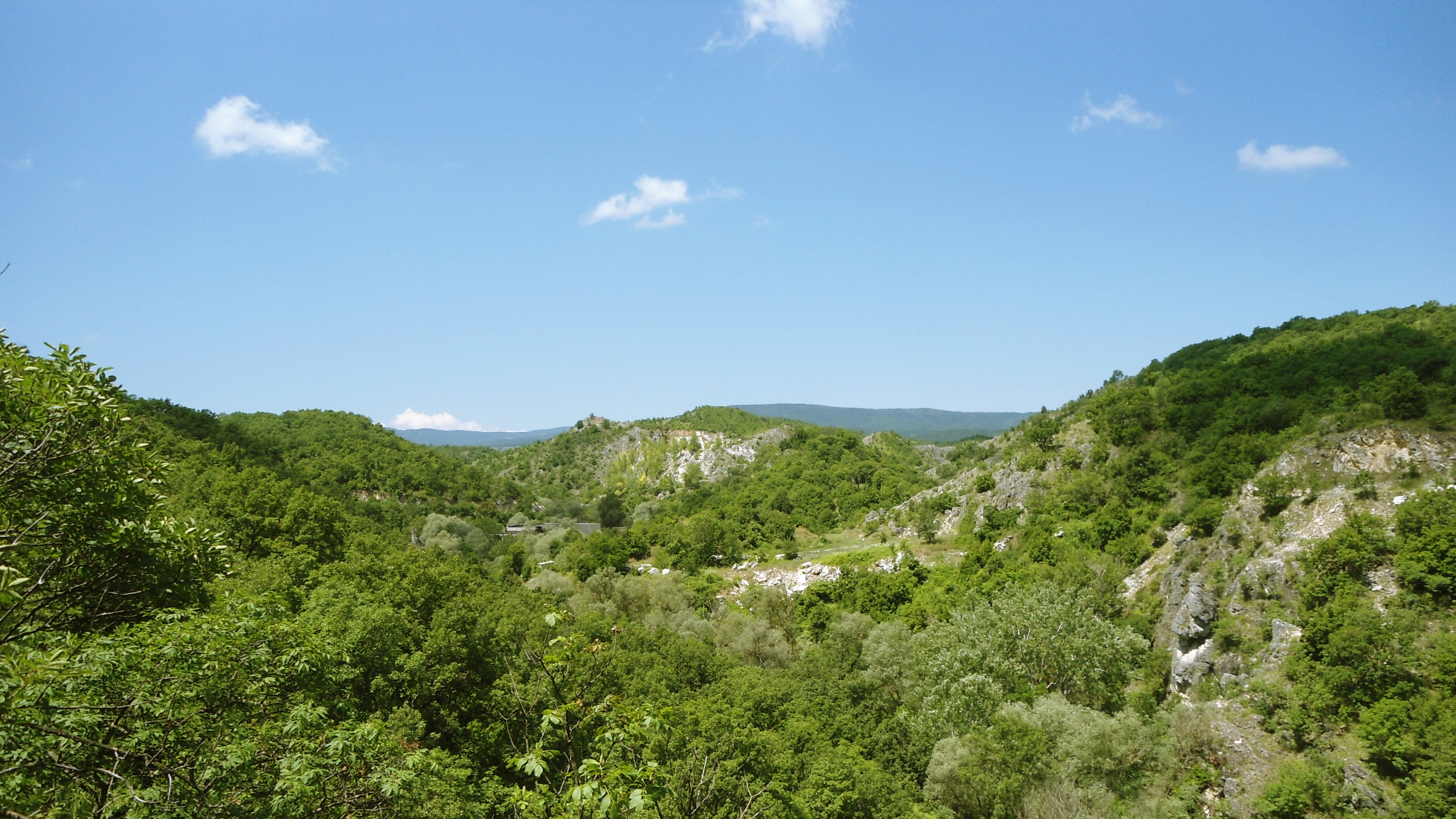
- Eastern slopes of Sakar

Highest point
- Elevation: 856 m (2,808 ft)
- Coordinates: 41°59′N 26°16′E

Naming
- Native name: Сакар (Bulgarian)

Geography
- Location within Bulgaria
- Location: Bulgaria

Sakar (Bulgarian: Сакар) is a low dome-shaped mountain range in southeastern Bulgaria, whose southeasternmost limits extend to European Turkey. Its highest peak is Vishegrad with an altitude of 856 meters above sea level. It is an important ornithological area and contains 220 bird species. Sakar Peak on Livingston Island in the South Shetland Islands, Antarctica is named after it.

== Geography ==
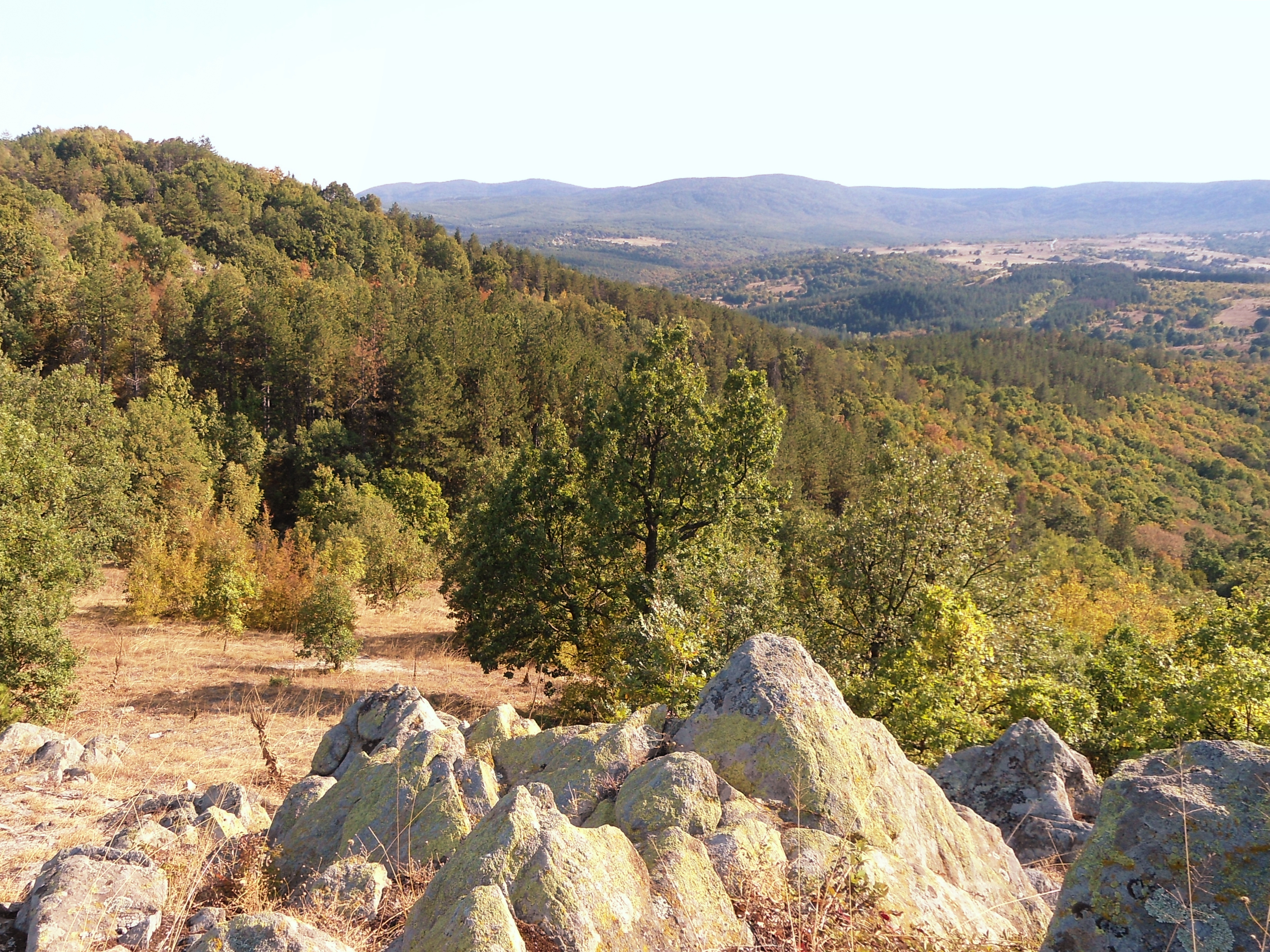
The northern slopes of Sakar

Sakar is situated between the valley of the river Maritsa to the southwest that separates with from the northeasternmost reaches of the Rhodope Mountains; the valley of the Sazliyka to the west that forms the boundary with the Upper Thracian Plain; the valleys of the Sokolitsa and the Sinapovska reka, as well as the Manastirski Heights to the north; the Srem Gorge of the river Tundzha to the east that separates it from the Dervent Heights; and to the southeast its limits reach the vicinity of the city of Edirne in Turkey. Within these boundaries the length of the mountain range in direction northwest–southeast is about 40 km; the width is 20 km at maximum.

The main ridge of Sakar straddles from northwest to southeast, outlined by a succession of flat-topped peaks. Long steep ridges branch off from it in direction southwest and northeast, reaching the river valleys on the edges of the mountain range. The highest point is Vishegrad (856 m), situated in the geographic center of Sakar.

The mountain range was formed during the late Jurassic and early Cretaceous periods, with the modern relief features dating from the late Tertiary and Quaternary periods under the influence of epeirogenic movements and erosional–depositional processes. Most of the range is a granitic batholith surrounded by metamorphic mantle of gneiss, amphibolites and schists, containing small deposits of polymetallic ores of little commercial importance.

Sakar is in the transitional zone between the temperate continental and the Mediterranean climate. It is drained by the rivers Sokolitsa and Glavanska reka, tributaries of the Sazliyka, the Bakardere, Golyama reka, Levchenska reka, Kalamitsa and other left tributaries of the Maritsa, as well as the Sinapovska reka, Bozashka reka and other right tributaries of the Tundzha. The predominant soils are mainly leached podzolic cinnamon forest soils, highly eroded in places.

== Nature ==
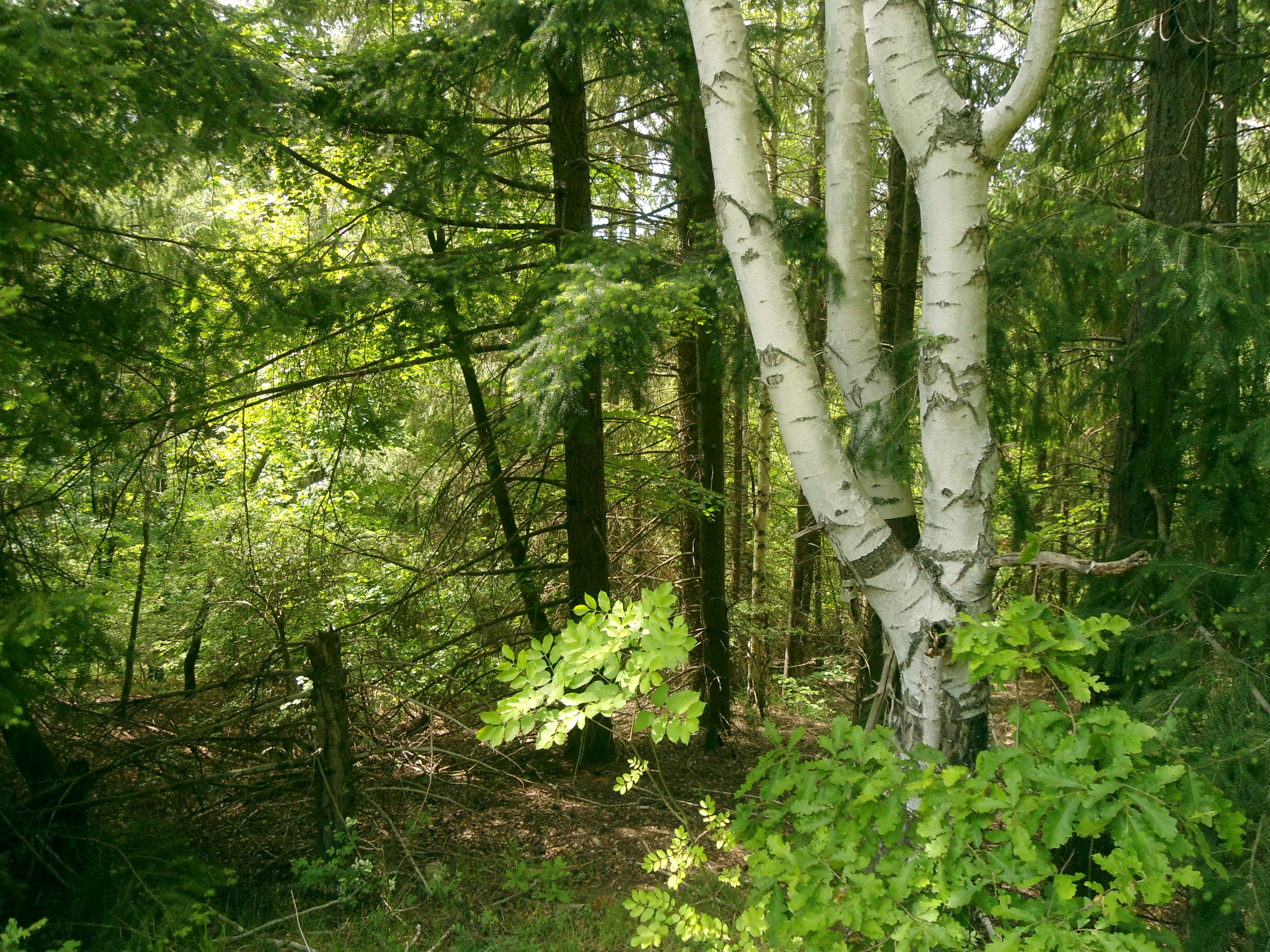
A forest in Sakar

The crest and the slopes are covered with deciduous forests and extensive pastures. The forests are dominated by xerophyte species, such as pubescent oak (Quercus pubescens), Austrian oak (Quercus cerris) and Hungarian oak (Quercus frainetto), with participation of Oriental hornbeam (Carpinus orientalis) and Jerusalem thorn (Paliurus spina-christi). Along the rivers and streams grow silver poplar (Populus alba) and white willow (Salix alba). There are also dispersed xerothermal grass associations, dominated by Bothriochloa ischaemum, Poa bulbosa, Chrysopogon gryllus, etc.

Sakar is an ornithologically important area and is the habitat of 220 bird species, of which 59 are included in the Red Data Book of the Republic of Bulgaria. The birds of prey are of particular importance. The mountain range hosts the largest populations of lesser spotted eagle, eastern imperial eagle, booted eagle, black kite and long-legged buzzard in Bulgaria. It is also an important stronghold for the greater spotted eagle, short-toed snake eagle, red kite, Levant sparrowhawk, Montagu's harrier, lesser kestrel and saker falcon. Other birds of high conservation relevance include great spotted cuckoo, corn crake, chukar partridge, black stork, tawny pipit, calandra lark, greater short-toed lark, masked shrike, red-backed shrike, Eurasian stone-curlew, olive-tree warbler, eastern Orphean warbler, Syrian woodpecker, grey-headed woodpecker, etc.

The warm climate of Sakar is favourable for reptiles. Threatened species under protection include Hermann's tortoise, Greek tortoise, European pond turtle, Balkan terrapin, javelin sand boa, blotched snake, Pallas's glass lizard and others.

== History ==
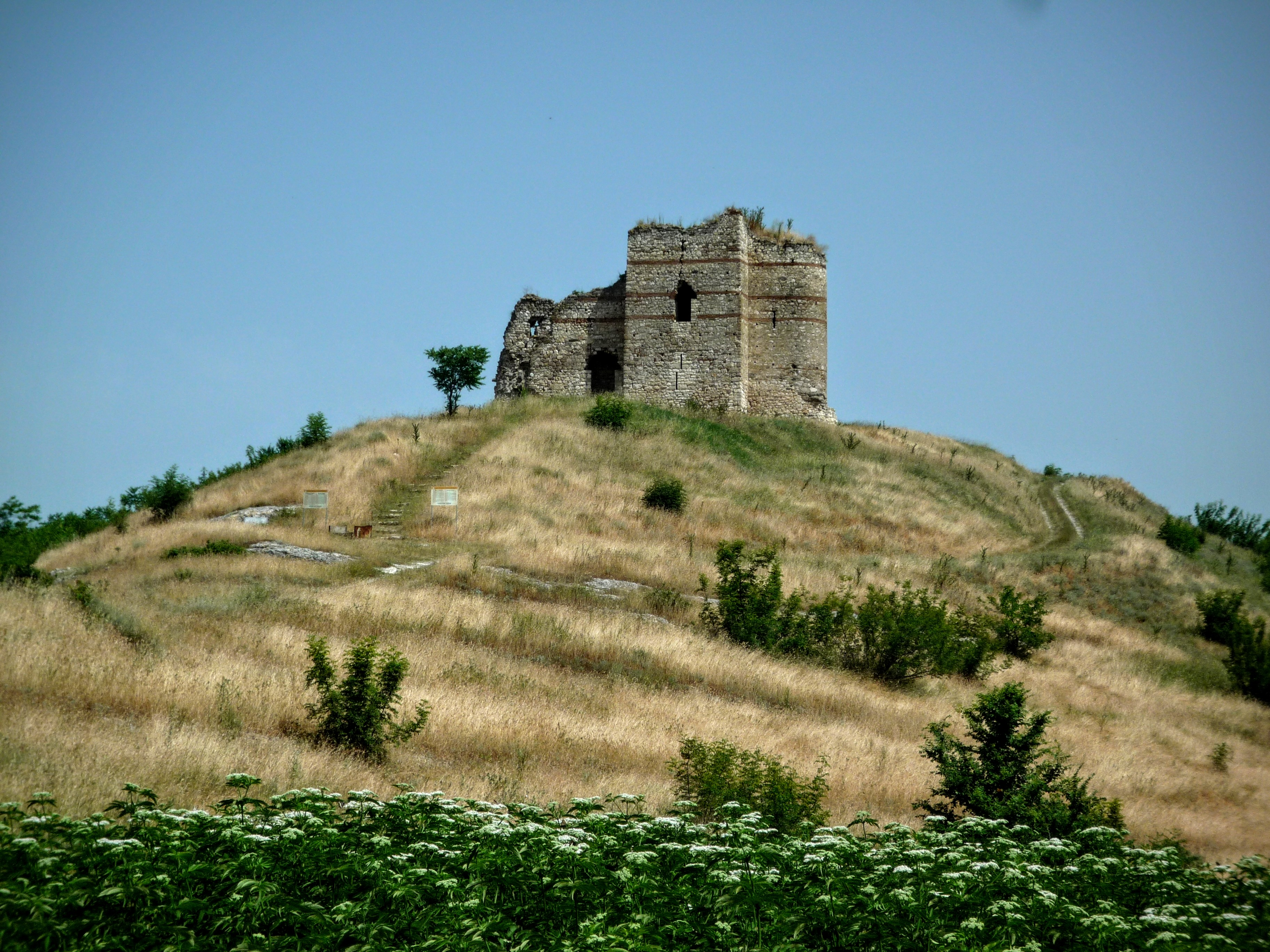
The ruins of Matochina Fortress in southeasternmost Sakar

The mountain range has been inhabited since ancient times. There are numerous dolmens and megalithic structures dated from the second millennium BC. During the Antiquity it was part of various Thracian states, including the Odrysian kingdom, and the Roman Empire. In the Middle Ages it often changed hands between the Bulgarian and the Byzantine Empires, before it was conquered by the Ottomans in the 14th century. From that period are the remains of several fortifications, the best preserved being the Matochina Fortress in its southeastern limits overlooking the valley of the Tundzha; Bulgarian jewelry dated from the 9-10th centuries have been excavated in the mountain range. During the Ottoman rule Sakar was a refuge for Bulgarian hayduks, including the notorious Indzhe Voyvoda. After the Liberation of Bulgaria in 1878 the northern part of Sakar was included in the reestablished country. The remainder was annexed by the Kingdom of Bulgaria in the aftermath of the First Balkan War in 1912–1913. The last border adjustment in the region was under the Bulgarian–Ottoman convention of 1915, when Bulgaria gained several villages in the southeasternmost part of Sakar.

== Settlements and transport ==
Administratively, Sakar lies in Stara Zagora and Haskovo Provinces. There are one town, Topolovgrad, and 58 villages in the mountain range and along its foothills, situated in Galabovo Municipality of Stara Zagora and the municipalities of Lyubimets, Svilengrad, Simeonovgrad, Topolovgrad and Harmanli in Haskovo Province. Its slopes are favourable for viticulture. Apart from grapes, crops of importance include tobacco, cherries, walnuts and almonds. There is some industry, mainly machine building and food processing.

Sakar is traversed by several transport routes of international and local importance. A section of the Maritsa motorway (A4) linking Central Europe and Asia runs along the whole length of its southwestern foothills between Harmanli and Generalovo. In direction north–south between Madrets and Svilengrad in its western part passes a 51.4 km stretch of the second class II-55 road Debelets–Nova Zagora–Svilengrad; In direction southwest–northeast between Harmanli and Knyazhevo runs a 61 km section of the second class II-76 road Harmanli–Topolovgrad–Elhovo. It is also traversed by several third class roads, namely a 21.8 km section of III-559 Polski Gradets–Topolovgrad–Ustrem in direction northwest–southeast, as well as the whole length of the 40.3 km III-761 road Knyazhevo–Matochina in direction north–south and the full length of the 21.4 km III-809 road Lyubimets–Golyamata Zvezda in direction southwest–northeast.
