= Hlyabovo =

Hlyabovo Хлябово
- Village
- Interactive map of Hlyabovo
- Coordinates: 42°05′N 26°25′E
- Country: Bulgaria
- Province: Haskovo Province
- Municipality: Topolovgrad

Area
  - Total: 52,666 km^{2} (20,334 sq mi)
- Elevation: 404 m (1,325 ft)

Population (2010)
  - Total: 567
- Time zone: UTC+2 (EET)
  - Summer (DST): UTC+3 (EEST)

Hlyabovo is a village in the municipality of Topolovgrad, in Haskovo Province, in southern Bulgaria.

== Geography ==
The village Hlyabovo is the second biggest settlement in the municipality of Topolovgrad. It is located within a large area on the northern slope of the Sakar Mountain. Its area borders Topolovgrad (to the east), Balgarska Polyana to the west, Orlov dol to the north and Kostur to the south. Hlyabovo is located within 10 miles of Golyama Zvezda, the crossroads among Elhovo, Glavan, Lyubimets, Svilengrad, and Harmanli. It is situated 80 km from Haskovo Stara Zagora and Yambol.

Mountain-hilly land of the loaves is located about 5000 ha area - farmland, pastures and forests. The soil is rocky, maroon-forest and not very fertile. The forests are deciduous mainly oak and beech and, in places, dominated by the elm.

== History ==
The oldest settlers lived on the territory of today's village were the Thracians. This is evident by the impressive megalithic monuments - dolmen and menhir and Cromlech in. They are preserved here. It is said that they are peers of the Stonehenge. It is therefore considered that the land of Hlyabovo was inhabited since ancient times. This is confirmed by the remains of Roman and Byzantine fortresses, military installations, roads in the territory of about 4–20 km around the village . The area of Sakar region was first included in the borders of Bulgaria in 705 year, Khan Tervel / 700-721 /.

The oldest written evidence of the existence of the village blessed Turkish tax records to collect the poll tax. The first dates from July 11, 1618 and the second from July 6, 1652 These documents appear under the name of the village GERDELYU / GERDEME / is the composition of Nahiya Uskudar / today s Shield Svilengrad / subject to the kaaza Edirne (today Edirne), which was owned by Sultan Bayazid Khan. In 1618 the village has 46 homesteads / families / and 34 years later, the village has 110 homesteads Gerdeme or about 1200 inhabitants. This increase in Gerdeme due mainly to flood the whole country fleeing Bulgarians. It is possible that the village is to be scaled according to legend, by combining several small villages that have suffered from Turkish robber bands. Here are the names of these settlements, located 4–5 km around the village today: Gulefirchevo, Pelifirchevo, Gerenya, Clapp, Irushtentsi, Evdzhika, Armudli (Krushevo today Sakartsi). Toponymy has preserved the names of these settlements, some others such as names of places. Not yet been conducted in-depth historical and archaeological research.

According to the Decree № 462 of 12.21.1906, the village Gerdeme was renamed to Hlyabovo with 1249 inhabitants. The village live 800 inhabitants.

== Religion ==
Bulgaria has been traditionally a Christian state since the adoption of Christianity as state religion in 865, and therefore the dominant confession is Eastern Orthodoxy of the Bulgarian Orthodox Church.

== Public institutions ==
A church built in Hlyabovo before the Liberation. Primary School 130 years; a Community Hall with rich library; kindergarten; a large commercial base, a hall for celebrations, a workshop for surgical sutures, engineering firm. church "Saint George"

== Cultural and natural landmarks ==
About 4 km west of the village, in the "Nachevi cheiri", near the road to the village of Balgarska polyana, are located three chamber dolmens. The place is marked and has built a path to the dolmen. Around the village there are Six well-preserved dolmens. One in the areas "Gaidarov dulap" and "Slavova grove," and in two localities "Evdzhika" and "Byalata treva". In the "Byalata treva" there is a royal dolmen which is the best preserved dolmen in Southeastern Europe.
