= Oreshnik =

Oreshnik may refer to:

- Oreshnik, Bulgaria
- Oreshnik, Vologda Oblast, a village in Russia
- Oreshnik (missile)
