= Svetiiliyski Heights =

- Bulgarian: Светиилийски възвишения
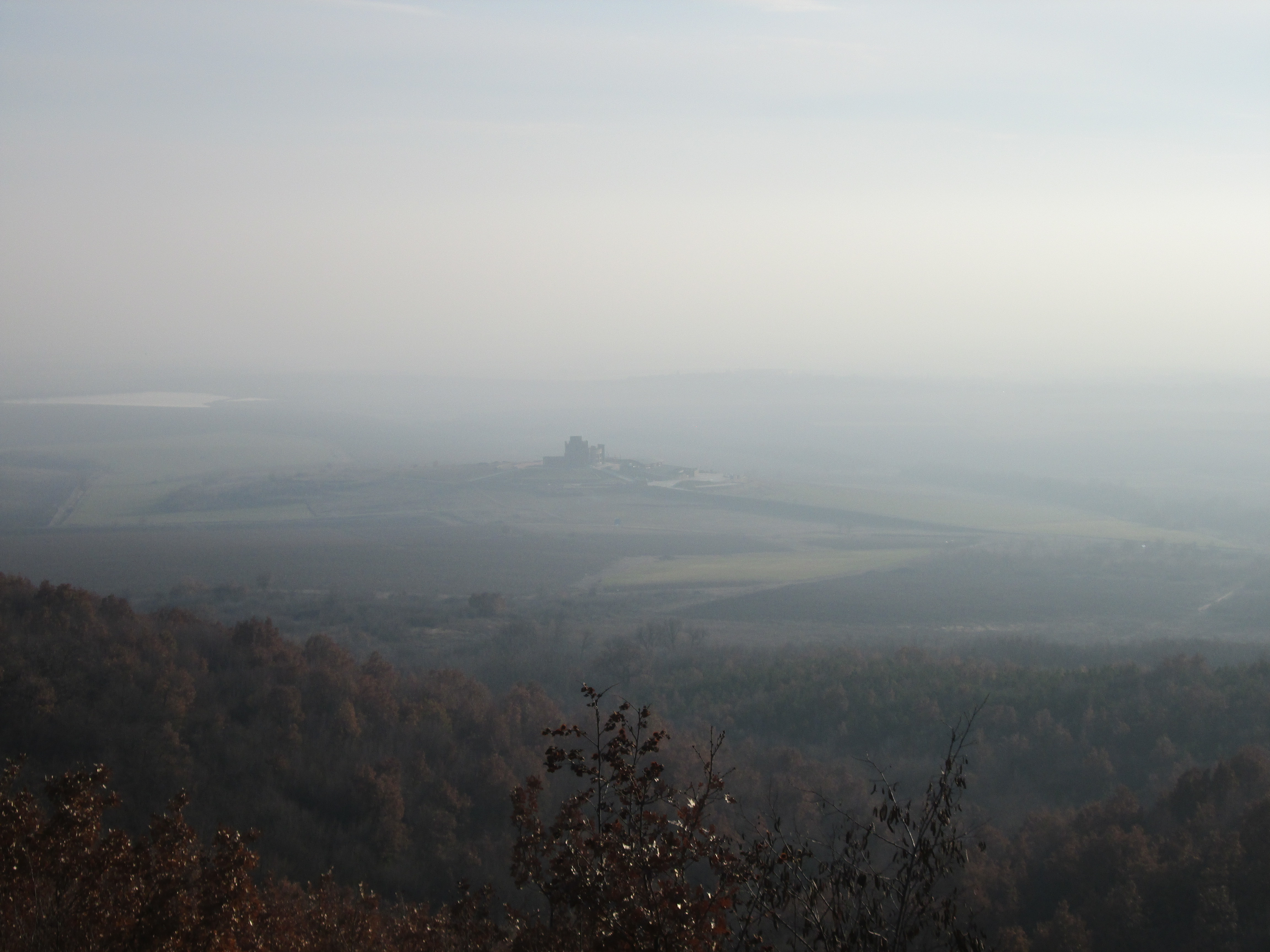

Highest point
- Peak: Ostrata Vila
- Elevation: 416 m (1,365 ft)
- Coordinates: 42°25′4.8″N 26°9′21.6″E

Dimensions
- Length: 25 km (16 mi) west-east
- Width: 6 km (3.7 mi) north-south

Geography
- Location within Bulgaria
- Country: Bulgaria

Svetiiliyski Heights (Bulgarian: Светиилийски възвишения, meaning the Heights of St Elijah) are a hilly ridge in southeastern Bulgaria. Administratively, they lie in Sliven and Yambol Provinces.

The heights are situated between the Upper Thracian Plain to the west and the Elhovo Field to the east. To the north are the eastern reaches of the Sredna Gora mountain range and to the south are the Manastirski Heights. The hilly ridge span some 25 km from west–northwest to east–southeast. The width varies between 5 km and 6 km. The highest point is at the elevation of Ostrata Vila (416 m), situated about 2.5 km southwest of the village of Pitovo in the northwestern part of the heights. They are built up of granite, limestone, marl and tuff. There are small deposits of iron ore near the village of Boyadzhik.

The climate is transitional continental with Mediterranean influence. The Svetiiliyski Heights are drained by the rivers Kalnitsa, a right tributary of the Tundzha, and Ovcharitsa, a left tributary of the Sazliyka, both of which take their source there, as well as by several small tributaries of the Blatnitsa. The soils are cinnamon forest soils. They are covered with extensive pastures.

There are 16 villages on the heights and their foothills: Grafitovo, Dyadovo, Elenovo, Omarchevo, Pitovo, Polsko Padarevo, Prohorovo, Radevo, Sokol in Sliven Province, as well as Botevo, Boyadzhik, Vidintsi, Zlatari, Meden Kladenets, Mezhda and Savino in Yambol Province. There are two roads from the national network running through the Svetiiliyski Heights and their foothills: a 3.6 km stretch of the second class II-55 road Debelets–Nova Zagora–Svilengrad in their northwesternmost reaches, and a 4.8 km section of the third class III-536 road Yambol–Skalitsa–Matsa between Botevo and Meden Kladenets in the southeasternmost parts of the heights.
