= Sokolitsa =

Location
- Country: Bulgaria

Physical characteristics
- Source
  - location: Sakar
  - coordinates: 42°0′56.16″N 26°16′37.92″E
  - elevation: 713 m (2,339 ft)
- Mouth
  - location: Sazliyka
  - coordinates: 42°7′54.84″N 25°52′48″E
  - elevation: 86 m (282 ft)
- Length: 61 km (38 mi)
- Basin size: 343 km^{2} (132 sq mi)

Basin features
- Progression: Sazliyka→ Maritsa

The Sokolitsa (Bulgarian: Соколица) is a river in southern Bulgaria, a left tributary of the river Sazliyka, itself a left tributary of the Maritsa. It has a length of 61 km.

The river takes its source under the name Sakarsko dere at an altitude of 713 m at the southern foothills of the summit of Bogovets (713 m) in the Sakar mountain range. Until the village of Orlov Dol it flows northwards in a deep valley. The river then turns west and flows in a wide valley with a small longitudinal slope. It flows into the Sazliyka at an altitude of 86 m south of the town of Galabovo.

Its drainage basin covers a territory of 343 km^{2} or 10.6% of the Sazliyka's total.

The Sokolitsa has predominantly rain feed with high water in January–May and low water in July–October.

The river flows in Haskovo and Stara Zagora Provinces. There are five villages along its course: Orlov Dol and Vladimirovo in Topolovgrad Municipality of Haskovo Province, and Madrets, Iskritsa and Obruchishte in Galabovo Municipality of Stara Zagora Province. The waters of the Sokolotsa are utilised for irrigation and industrial supply.
