= Captain Petko Voivode =

Petko Voyvoda, Petko Kiryakov (1844 - 1900), was a Bulgarian revolutionary.

Captain Petko Voivode may also refer to:

- Captain Petko Voivode (TV series), a Bulgarian TV series released in 1981
- Kapitan Petko voyvoda, a village in Haskovo Province, Bulgaria
