= Pchela (disambiguation) =

Pchela is a village in Bulgaria.

Pchela or Ptchela literally meaning "bee" may also refer to:

- Pchela, 19th century Russian magazine
- Yakovlev Pchela, Russian UAV constructed by Yakovlev

== See also ==
- Severnaya Pchela (Northern Bee), Russian daily newspaper (1825–1864)
