= Kalnitsa =

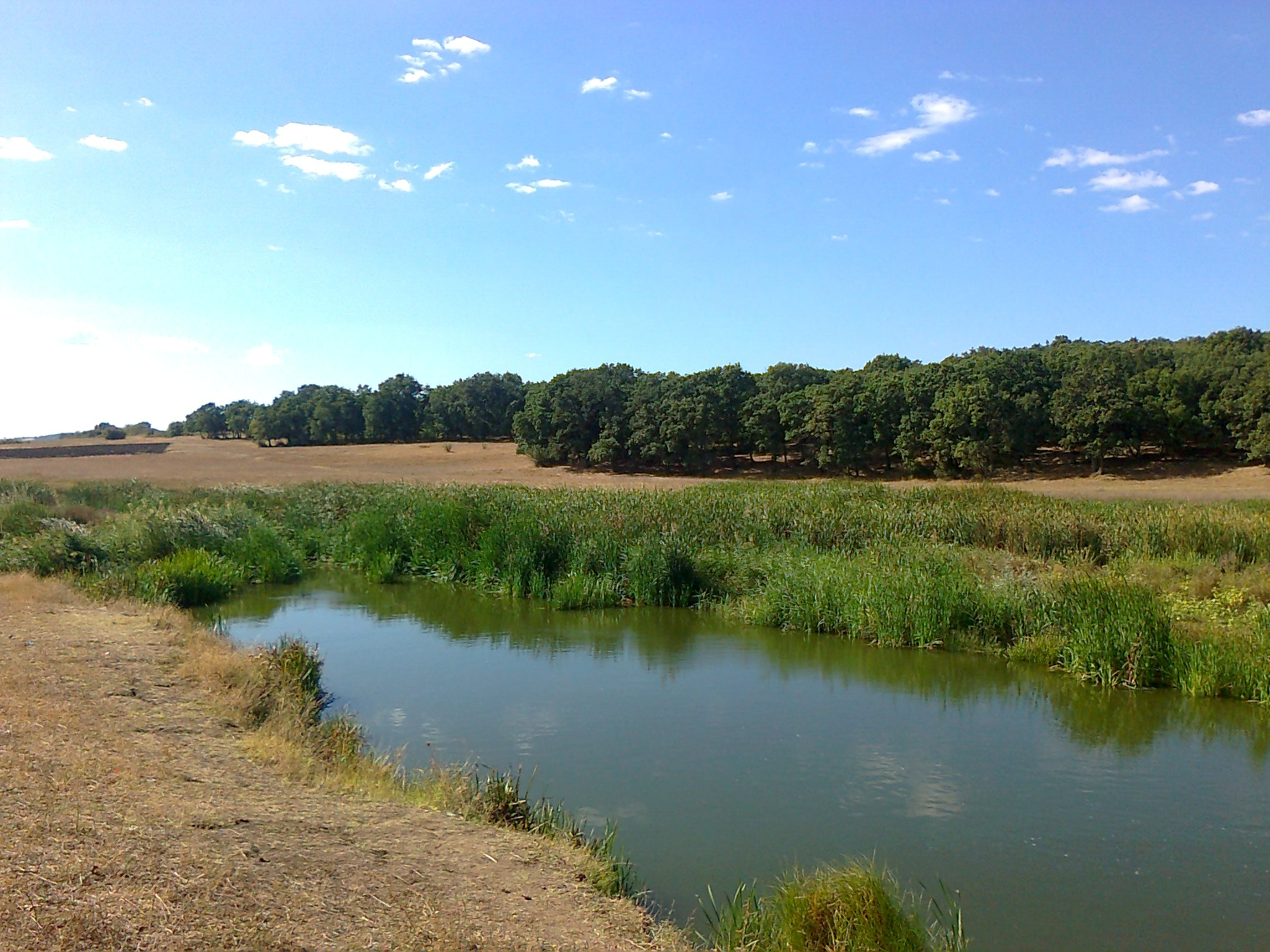

Location
- Country: Bulgaria

Physical characteristics
- Source
  - location: Svetiiliyski Heights
  - coordinates: 41°25′1.92″N 26°12′34.94″E
  - elevation: 203 m (666 ft)
- Mouth
  - location: Sinapovska reka
  - coordinates: 42°7′26.04″N 26°30′25.92″E
  - elevation: 97 m (318 ft)
- Length: 72 km (45 mi)
- Basin size: 577 km^{2} (223 sq mi)

Basin features
- Progression: Sinapovska reka→ Tundzha→ Maritsa

The Kalnitsa (Bulgarian: Калница) is a 72 km long river in southern Bulgaria, a right tributary of the river Sinapovska reka, itself a left tributary of the Tundzha of the Maritsa drainage. It is the largest tributary of the Sinapovska reka and is longer than the latter.

The river takes its source under the name Tekirya at an altitude of 203 m in the Svetiiliyski Heights, some 1.3 km southeast of the village of Pitovo. Along its entire length, it flows in a shallow valley with a sandy bed and with a very small longitudinal slope (0.15 m/km). In its upper course, the flows through the western part of the Yambol Field, initially in eastern direction until the village of Boyadzhik, and then in southeastern direction to General Inzovo, where its bed is corrected with water protection dikes. The Kalnitsa then winds around the Manastirski Heights from the east and downstream of the village of Pchela flows through the western part of the Elhovo Field with numerous meanders. It flows into the Sinapovska reka at an altitude of 97 m just one kilometer west of the latter's confluence with the Tundzha.

Its drainage basin covers a territory of 577 km^{2} or 66.25% of the Sinapovska reka's total.

The Kalnitsa has predominantly rain feed with high water in autumn and winter. The average annual flow is at the village of Krumovo is 1.65 m^{3}/s.

The river flows entirely in Sliven, Yambol and Haskovo Provinces. There are five settlements along its course, the villages of Boyadzhik, General Inzovo, Krumovo, Drama and Pchela, all of them in Yambol Province, the first four in Tundzha Municipality and the last one in Elhovo Municipality. The river's waters are utilised for irrigation.
