= Mramor, Haskovo Province =

- Village
- Location within Bulgaria
- Coordinates: 42.0500°N 26.4000°E
- Country: Bulgaria
- Province: Haskovo Province
- Municipality: Topolovgrad
- Time zone: UTC+2 (EET)
  - Summer (DST): UTC+3 (EEST)

Mramor, Haskovo Province is a village in the municipality of Topolovgrad, in Haskovo Province, in southern Bulgaria.
