= Indzhe Voyvoda =

Indzhe Voyvoda (Bulgarian: Индже войвода) (c. 1755, Sliven – 1821, Sculeni) was a Bulgarian leader (voivod) of an armed band of outlaws (hajduks) in Ottoman-held Bulgaria. He mainly operated in the mountainous regions of Strandzha, Sakar and the eastern Balkan Mountains.

During the feudal seditions in the Ottoman Empire, Stoyan (his nickname Indzhe comes from Ottoman Turkish ince, "slim") became the leader of a large gang of robbers. His band attempted to attack and rob the town of Kotel, but its inhabitants erected a three-metre high wall and drove them back. He later gave up robbing and began to patronize the poor Bulgarian population, according to one legend leading an insurrection in the early 19th century. In 1806 Indzhe moved to Moldavia, where he enrolled in the local rulers' guard and continued to fight against the Ottomans, until dying in 1821 in the Battle of Sculeni.

He is still remembered in Bulgarian folklore, and many folk songs honour him. The Bulgarian village of Indzhe Voyvoda in the Strandzha Mountain is named in his memory.

== Bibliography ==
- Narodni pesni za Indzhe voivoda, M. Petrov, ISBN 954-739-763-X (Народни песни за Индже войвода, Петров, Милю)
