= Radovets =

- Village
- Interactive map of Radovets
- Country: Bulgaria
- Province: Haskovo Province
- Municipality: Topolovgrad
- Time zone: UTC+2 (EET)
  - Summer (DST): UTC+3 (EEST)

Radovets is a village in the municipality of Topolovgrad, in Haskovo Province, in southern Bulgaria.

== Birds ==
Because the area around the village of Radovets has many habitats, vast numbers of birds can be seen. Great Spotted Cuckoo was spotted 5 times in 2021. All the harriers are common during their season. Among the other birds you can see in the area are Lesser Spotted Eagle, Booted Eagle, Barn Owl, Firecrest, Masked Shrike, Woodchat Shrike, Calandra Lark, European Bee-eater, Golden Oriole, Great Reed Warbler, Eastern Olivaceous Warbler, Olive-tree Warbler and Short-toed Snake Eagle.
