= Klyushnikovo, Vologda Oblast =

Klyushnikovo Клюшниково
- Village
- Location within Vologda Oblast Location within Russia
- Coordinates: 59°11′N 39°29′E
- Country: Russia
- Region: Vologda Oblast
- District: Vologodsky District
- Time zone: UTC+3:00

Klyushnikovo (Russian: Клюшниково) is a rural locality (a village) in Sosnovskoye Rural Settlement, Vologodsky District, Vologda Oblast, Russia. The population was 3 as of 2002.

== Geography ==
Klyushnikovo is located 28 km southwest of Vologda (the district's administrative centre) by road. Yazvitsevo is the nearest rural locality.
