= Knyazevo, Vologodsky District, Vologda Oblast =

Knyazevo Князево
- Village
- Location within Vologda Oblast Location within Russia
- Coordinates: 59°11′N 39°28′E
- Country: Russia
- Region: Vologda Oblast
- District: Vologodsky District
- Time zone: UTC+3:00

Knyazevo (Russian: Князево) is a rural locality (a village) in Sosnovskoye Rural Settlement, Vologodsky District, Vologda Oblast, Russia. The population was 6 as of 2002.

== Geography ==
Knyazevo is located 29 km west of Vologda (the district's administrative centre) by road. Klyushnikovo is the nearest rural locality.
