= Balgarska polyana =

Balgarska Polyana
- Village
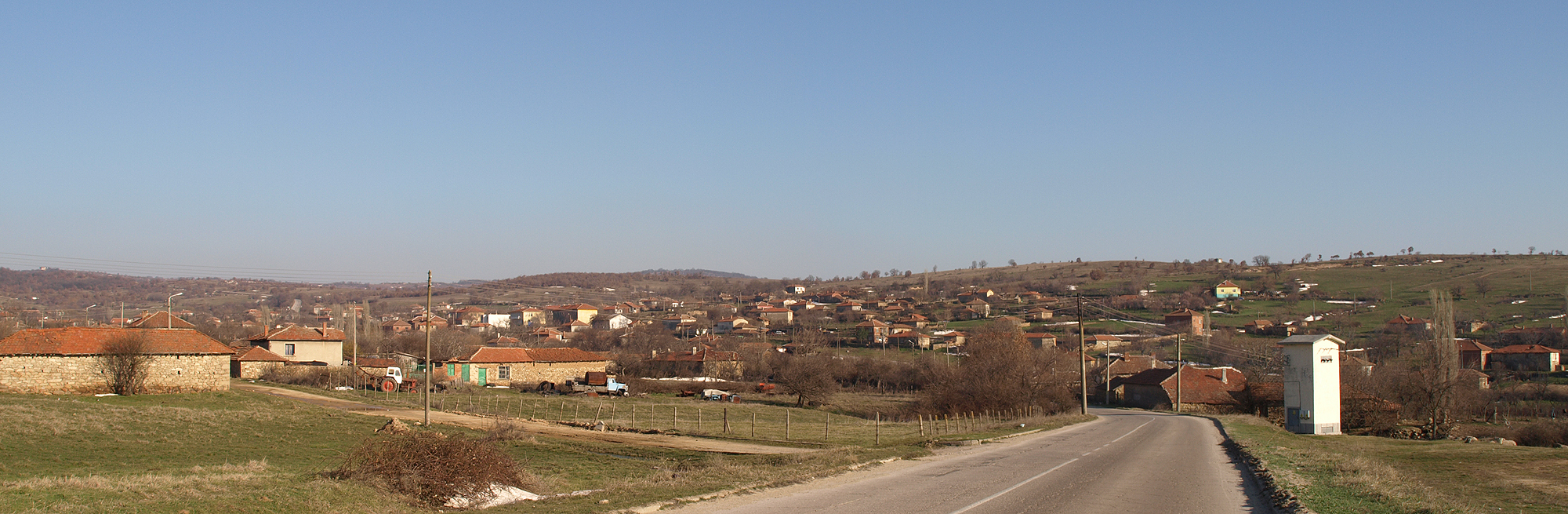
- Panoramic view of the village

- Location within Bulgaria
- Coordinates: 42°02′N 26°12′E
- Country: Bulgaria
- Province: Haskovo Province
- Municipality: Topolovgrad
- Time zone: UTC+2 (EET)
  - Summer (DST): UTC+3 (EEST)

Balgarska Polyana (Bulgarian: Българска Поляна)is a village in the municipality of Topolovgrad, in Haskovo Province, in southern Bulgaria.
