= Filipovo, Haskovo Province =

Filipovo
- Village
- Location within Bulgaria
- Coordinates: 41°54′51″N 26°31′2″E
- Country: Bulgaria
- Province: Haskovo Province
- Municipality: Topolovgrad
- Time zone: UTC+2 (EET)
  - Summer (DST): UTC+3 (EEST)

Filipovo is a village in the municipality of Topolovgrad, in Haskovo Province, in southern Bulgaria.
