= Matochina =

Matochina Маточина
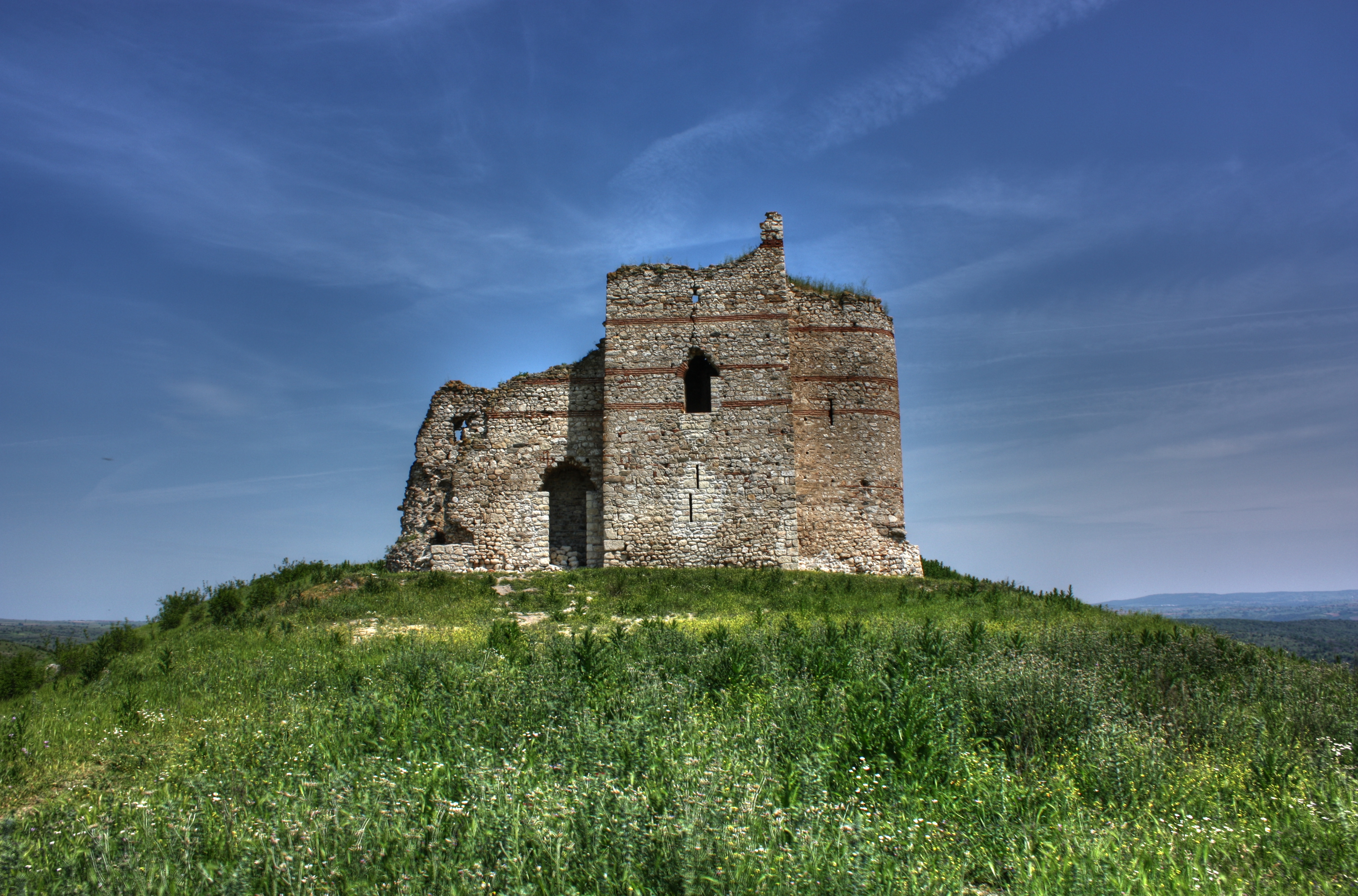
- The keep of the medieval Matochina Fortress

- Location of Matochina
- Coordinates: 41°51′N 26°33′E
- Country: Bulgaria
- Provinces (Oblast): Haskovo
- Municipality: Svilengrad Municipality

Government
  - Mayor: Georgi Manolov (Svilengrad)
- Elevation: 164 m (538 ft)

Population (2009)
  - Total: 37
- Time zone: UTC+2 (EET)
  - Summer (DST): UTC+3 (EEST)
- Postal Code: 6535
- Area code: 037701

Matochina (Bulgarian: Маточина, "lemon balm") is a small village in southeastern Bulgaria, part of Svilengrad municipality, Haskovo Province. Matochina lies in the southernmost ridges of the Sakar Mountain, 40 kilometres (25 mi) from the municipal centre Svilengrad and 110 kilometres (68 mi) from the provincial capital Haskovo; it is located just west of the Bulgaria–Turkey border and not far northeast of the Bulgaria–Greece border. The village is famous for the medieval Matochina Fortress.

== History ==
Matochina has existed since at least 1664, when Ottoman sultan Mehmed IV was reported to have hunted near the abandoned fortress and the village located below it. During that time, Matochina was known as Fikla or Fikel. The village was passed to Bulgaria in 1912. It was renamed to Matochina in 1934 due to the abundance of the Mediterranean herb lemon balm (Melissa officinalis) in the surrounding area.

=== Churches ===
Matochina's entire population is Bulgarian Orthodox by confession. The village has a medieval cave church that dates to the 10th century; the church is named after the Epiphany and was in use until the mid-20th century. The cave church lies 2 kilometres (1.2 mi) southwest of the village. It is a rectangular room with an arch carved out of the rock. The cella or naos is 9.9 metres (32 ft) wide and up to 5 metres (16 ft) high. The entrance to the church is an overarched passage 4.4 metres (14 ft) long and 3 metres (9.8 ft) high. Another church, dedicated to the Saints Constantine and Helena, was inaugurated in late 1935.

=== Castle ===
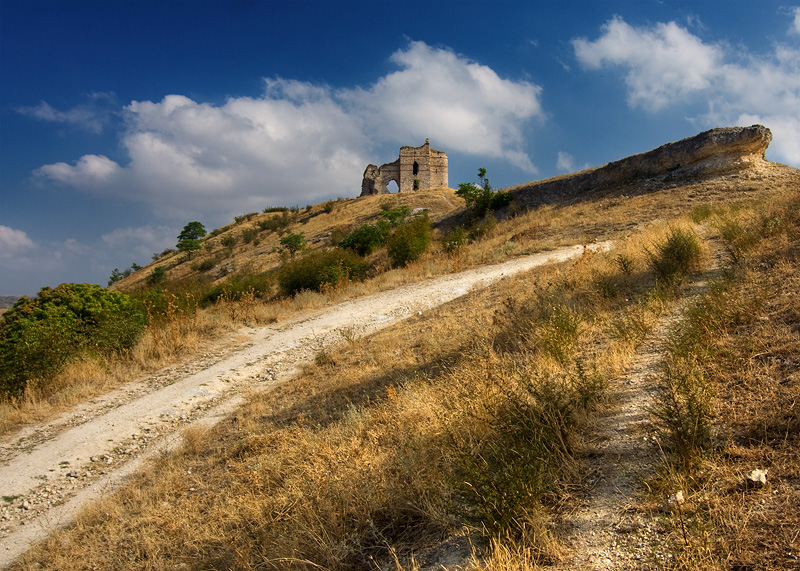
The Matochina Fortress

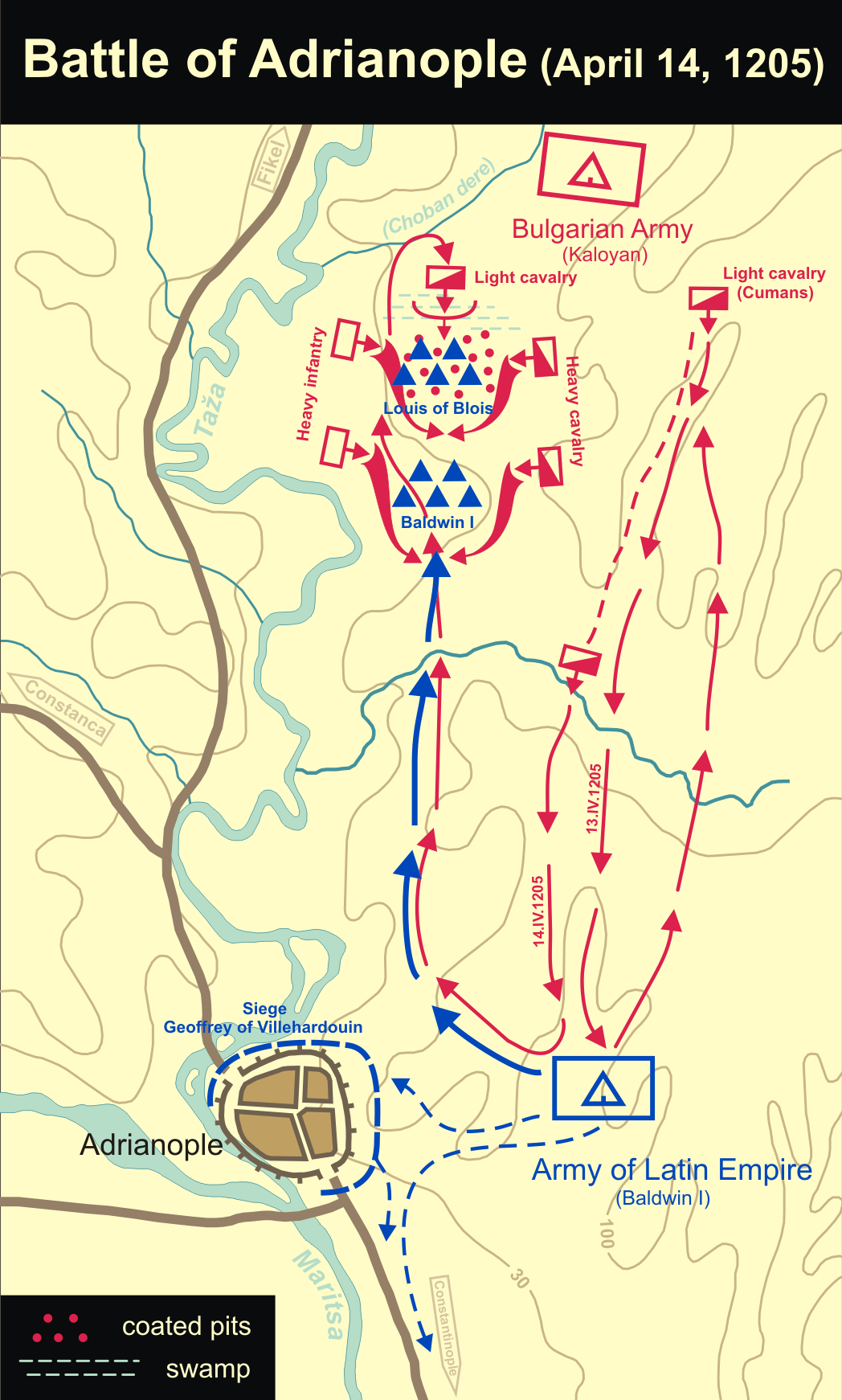
The Matochina Fortress (Fikel) and Battle of Adrianople (1205)

The Matochina Fortress (Маточинска крепост, Matochinska krepost), also known as Bukelon (Букелон), lies on a plateau to the northeast of the village itself. Bukelon was reportedly mentioned in reports about the Battle of Adrianople of 378. The only well-preserved part of the castle today is the inner fortress with the keep, which is 18 metres (59 ft) in height and dates to the 12th–14th century. The keep is a three-storey tower with arrow loops on all sides. The third storey was reportedly used as a chapel for the defenders. The keep was constructed out of stone and bricks. A cross-shaped brick monogram to the side of the entrance indicates that the fortress may have been reconstructed by Tsar Michael Shishman of Bulgaria (1323–1330). The keep is rectangular in shape with two protruding parts, one of which is semicylindrical. The Matochina Fortress was part of Adrianople's defensive system and protected the city from the north. Form here bulgarian army go to the Battle of Adrianople (1205).

== Honour ==
Matochina Peak in Imeon Range on Smith Island in the South Shetland Islands, Antarctica is named after Matochina.
