= Oreshnik, Vologda Oblast =

Oreshnik Орешник
- Village
- Location within Vologda Oblast Location within Russia
- Coordinates: 59°25′N 38°59′E
- Country: Russia
- Region: Vologda Oblast
- District: Vologodsky District
- Time zone: UTC+3:00

Oreshnik (Russian: Орешник) is a rural locality (a village) in Kubenskoye Rural Settlement, Vologodsky District, Vologda Oblast, Russia. The population was 2 as of 2002.

== Geography ==
Oreshnik is located 71 km northwest of Vologda (the district's administrative centre) by road. Dekteri is the nearest rural locality.
