= Matochina Fortress =

Coordinates: 41.8536°N 26.5470°E

Matochina Fortress (Bulgarian: Маточинска крепост), also known as Bukelon (Bulgarian: Букелон) – Roman, Byzantine and Bulgarian medieval fortress.

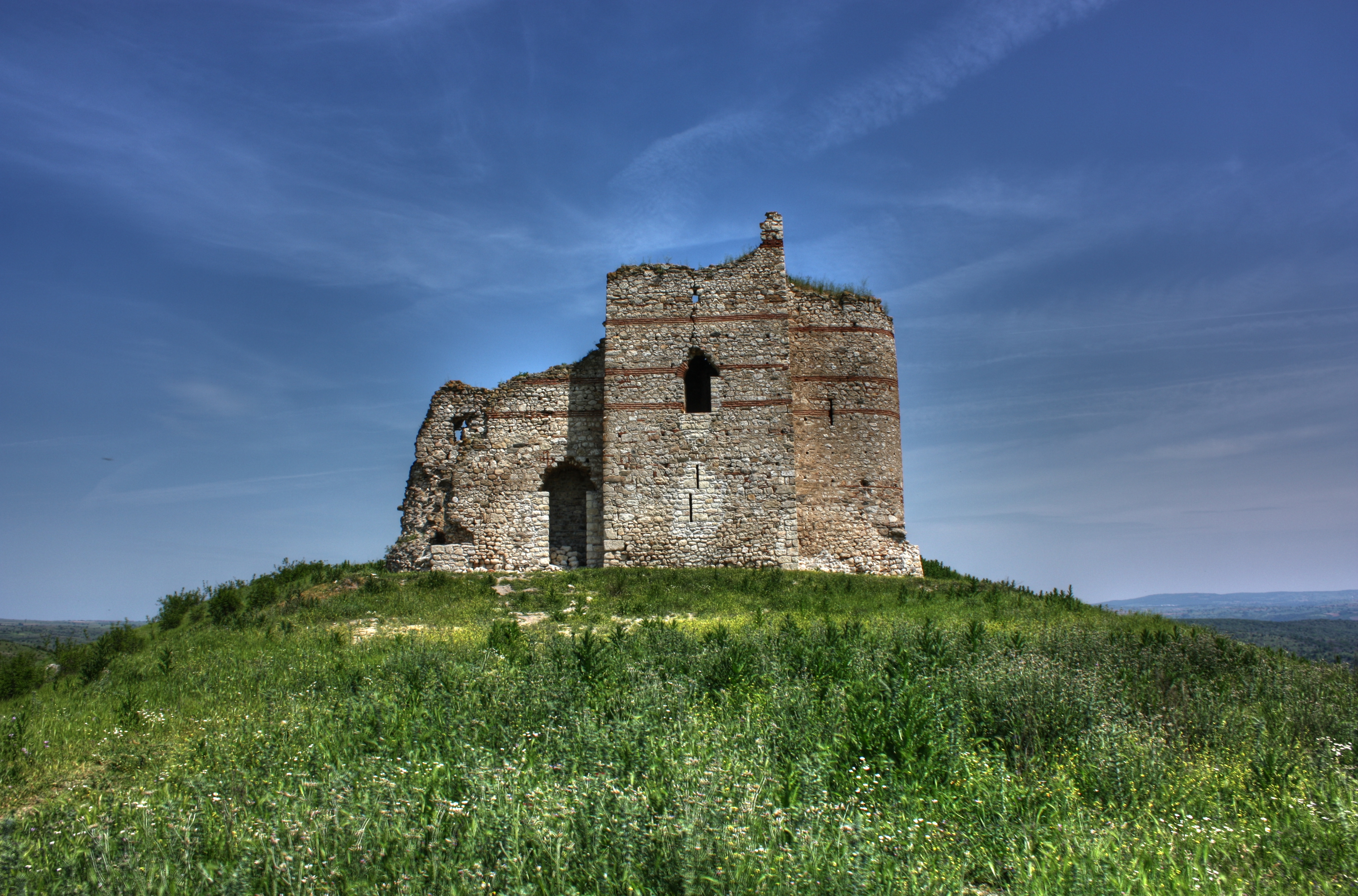
Ruins of the Keep

== Location ==
The ruins of Matochina Fortress are is located on a plateau on a hill raised high from the lowlands of the Tundzha River, near the village of Matochina, Svilengrad Municipality, Haskovo District, Southeastern Bulgaria, near the Turkish border.

== Ruins ==
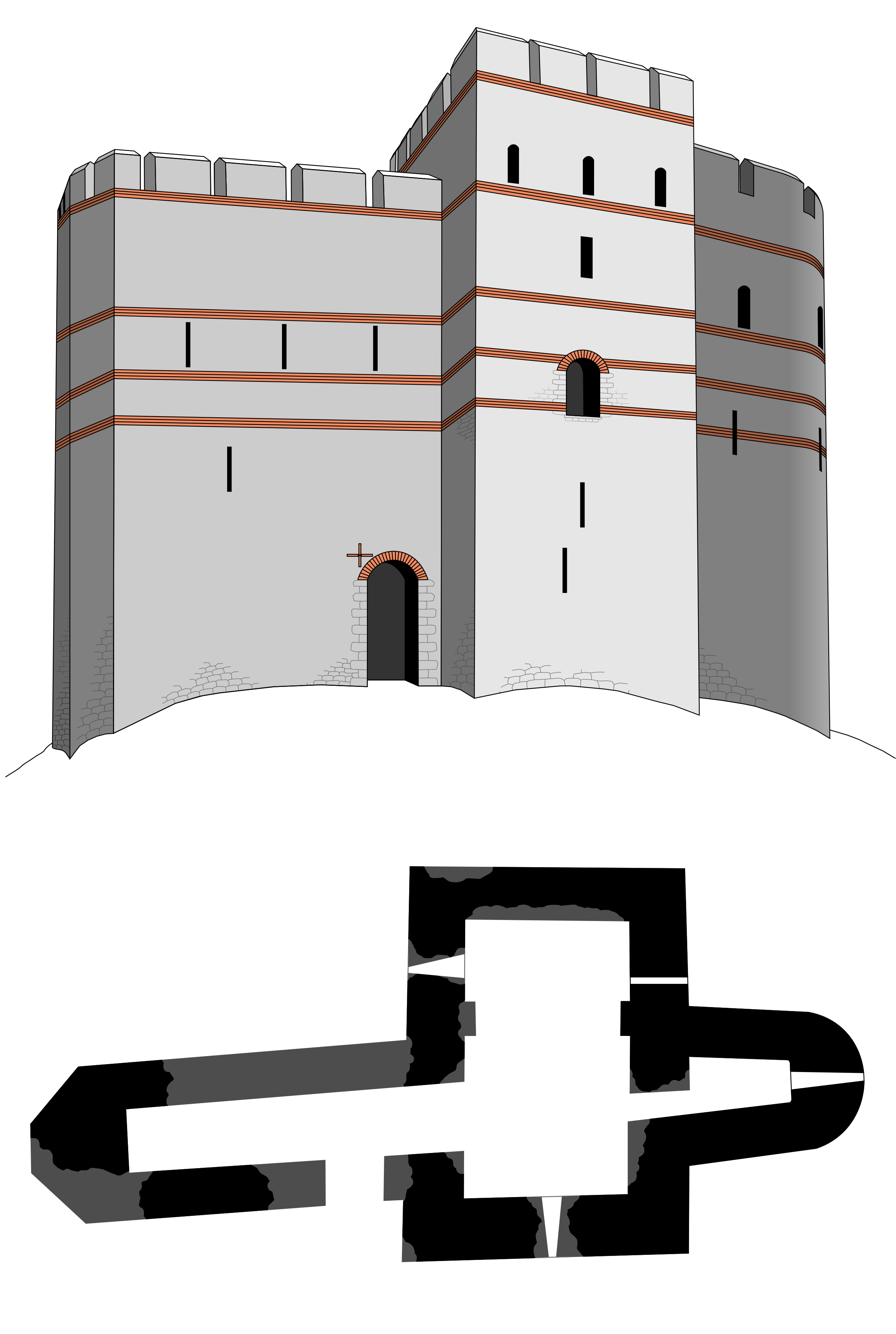
Plan of the tower (keep) of the fortress Matochina

What now remains of the castle dates from the XI-XIV century is preserved citadel that towers of 18 meters high. It is built of crushed stone jointed with plaster and facade is decorated with baked bricks. The architectural design of the tower consists of three parts: the eastern semi-cylindrical in shape, rectangular body in which they were at the accommodation and the west corridor, which was over a castle wall. Of the remaining buildings and fortifications has not retained much. There are signs of a small chapel and water containers. At its entrance is clear monogram in the form of a cross with the letters M, N, L and K. In general, the castle is about 65 meters wide and 150 meters long.

== History ==
According to historians here have led to battles of Adrianople by the Romans and the Goths 378. Later the fort was abandoned to return to the Middle Ages in all its glory and power.

In the vicinity of the castle Bukelon takes place with the Battle of Adrianople (1205), when the troops of tsar Kaloyan defeated the knights of the Fourth Crusade, led by Baldwin of Flanders.

After the fall of the Second Bulgarian Empire (1396) under Ottoman rule, the fortress fell into disrepair and was abandoned.

At the end of the last century Bukelon has been partially restored. It was declared a cultural monument and is part of the 100 National Tourist Sites of Bulgaria.

== Restoration ==
The first comprehensive architectural and archaeological study was conducted in 1961 by arch. Stefan Boyadzhiev. The ruins near the village of Matochina were declared an "object of national importance" in 1968. In 1970, limited measures were taken to preserve the medieval tower. Research and excavations of the fortress were carried out in 2008 and 2017.

== Sources ==
- Zaikov, Konstantin "Treasures of the Tundzha Valley, between Strandzha and Sakar"
- Boyadzhiev, Stefan. "The fortress near the village of Matochina" – in the magazine "Archeology" VII, Sofia 1965, no. 1, 1 – 8.
- Boyadzhiev, Stefan "The medieval fortress near the village of Matochina, Svilengrad region": in coll. "The Battle of Edirne in 1205", comp. Gyuzelev, V., ed. University Publishing House "St. Kliment Ohridski ”, Sofia 2005
- Yordanov, Angel "Vukelon", magazine "Buditel", issue. 1, 2006, Sofia
