= Knyazevo, Voronezh Oblast =

Knyazevo Князево
- Village
- Location within Voronezh Oblast Location within Russia
- Coordinates: 52°03′N 39°11′E
- Country: Russia
- Region: Voronezh Oblast
- District: Ramonsky District
- Time zone: UTC+3:00

Knyazevo (Russian: Князево) is a rural locality (a village) in Komsomolskoye Rural Settlement, Ramonsky District, Voronezh Oblast, Russia. The population was 515 as of 2010. There are 4 streets.

== Geography ==
Knyazevo is located 31 km northwest of Ramon (the district's administrative centre) by road. Otskochnoye is the nearest rural locality.
