= Knyazevo, Gryazovetsky District, Vologda Oblast =

Knyazevo Князево
- Village
- Location within Vologda Oblast Location within Russia
- Coordinates: 58°55′N 40°05′E
- Country: Russia
- Region: Vologda Oblast
- District: Gryazovetsky District
- Time zone: UTC+3:00

Knyazevo (Russian: Князево) is a rural locality (a village) in Pertsevskoye Rural Settlement, Gryazovetsky District, Vologda Oblast, Russia. The population was 4 as of 2002.

== Geography ==
Knyazevo is located 13 km (8.1 mi) northwest of Gryazovets (the district's administrative centre) by road. Anopino is the nearest rural locality.
