= Yazvitsevo =

Yazvitsevo Язвицево
- Village
- Location within Vologda Oblast Location within Russia
- Coordinates: 59°31′N 37°15′E
- Country: Russia
- Region: Vologda Oblast
- District: Kaduysky District
- Time zone: UTC+3:00

Yazvitsevo (Russian: Язвицево) is a rural locality (a village) in Nikolskoye Rural Settlement, Kaduysky District, Vologda Oblast, Russia. The population was 15 as of 2002.

== Geography ==
Yazvitsevo is located 51 km northeast of Kaduy (the district's administrative centre) by road. Krasnoye is the nearest rural locality.
