= Oreshnik, Bulgaria =

Oreshnik
- Village
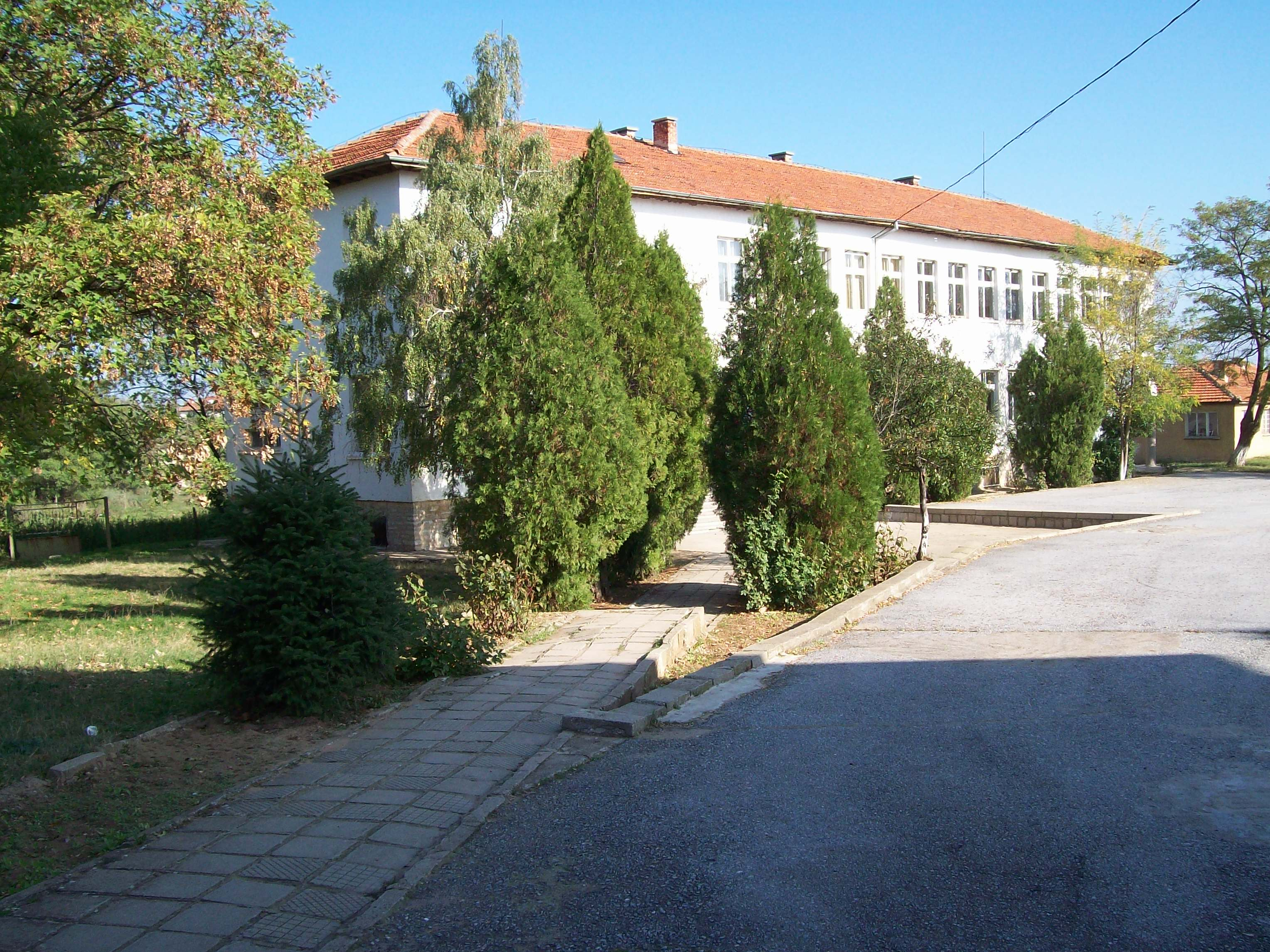
- School in Oreshnik

- Location within Bulgaria
- Coordinates: 42°04′N 26°22′E
- Country: Bulgaria
- Province: Haskovo Province
- Municipality: Topolovgrad

Population (2024)
  - Total: 451
- Time zone: UTC+2 (EET)
  - Summer (DST): UTC+3 (EEST)

Oreshnik (Bulgarian: Орешник, Greek: Καραϊς Karais or Καρυές Karyes) is a village in the municipality of Topolovgrad, in Haskovo Province, in southern Bulgaria.
