= Blatnitsa (river) =

Location
- Country: Bulgaria

Physical characteristics
- Source
  - location: Sredna Gora
  - coordinates: 42°34′18.12″N 26°9′33.12″E
  - elevation: 266 m (873 ft)
- Mouth
  - location: Sazliyka
  - coordinates: 42°16′49.08″N 25°55′18.84″E
  - elevation: 108 m (354 ft)
- Length: 54 km (34 mi)
- Basin size: 656 km^{2} (253 sq mi)

Basin features
- Progression: Sazliyka→ Maritsa

The Blatnitsa (Bulgarian: Блатница) is a river in southern Bulgaria, a left tributary of the river Sazliyka, itself a left tributary of the Maritsa. It has a length of 54 km.

The river takes its source at an altitude of 266 m from the Kapaklia spring, located in the easternmost reaches of the Sredna Gora mountain range, some 1 km southeast of the village of Staro Selo. Throughout its whole course the Blatnitsa flows through the Upper Thracian Plain in a shallow valley. It initially flows south, at the village of Konyovo it turns in direction west-southwest until the town of Nova Zagora, when it takes a turn to the south-southwest until its confluence with the Sazliyka at an altitude of 108 m in the southwestern neighbourhoods of the town of Radnevo.

Its drainage basin covers a territory of 656 km^{2} or 20.25% of the Sazliyka's total.

The Blatnitsa has predominantly rain feed with high water in January–May and low water in July–October.

The river flows in Sliven and Stara Zagora Provinces. There are five settlements along its course: the villages of Konyovo, Ezero, Bogdanovo and Lyubenova Mahala in Nova Zagora Municipality of Sliven Province, and the town of Radnevo in Radnevo Municipality of Stara Zagora Province. A 23.7 km stretch of the third class III-554 road Nova Zagora–Radnevo–Harmanli follows its valley. Along the same stretch passes a section of the Simeonovgrad–Nova Zagora railway. Its waters are almost completely utilised for irrigation for the intensive agriculture in the Upper Thracian Plain.
