= Kapitan Petko voyvoda =

Kapitan Petko Voyvoda
- Village
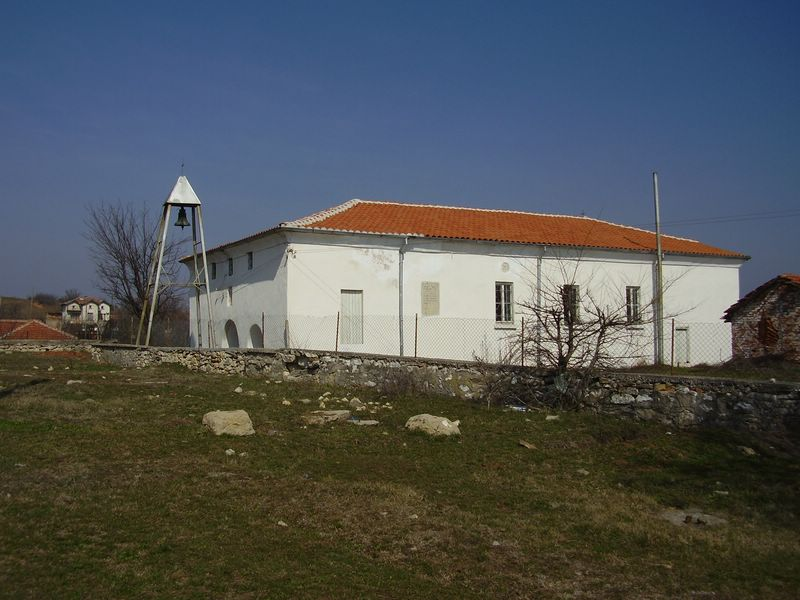
- Church in Kapitan Petko Voivoda

- Location in Bulgaria
- Coordinates: 42°04′20″N 26°25′19″E
- Country: Bulgaria
- Province: Haskovo Province
- Municipality: Topolovgrad

Population (2013)
  - Total: 135
- Time zone: UTC+2 (EET)
  - Summer (DST): UTC+3 (EEST)

Kapitan Petko voyvoda (Bulgarian: Капитан Петко войвода; Greek: Δογάνογλου) is a village in the municipality of Topolovgrad, in Haskovo Province, in southern Bulgaria.
