= Knyazhevo, Sokolsky District, Vologda Oblast =

Knyazhevo Княжево
- Village
- Location within Vologda Oblast Location within Russia
- Coordinates: 59°39′N 40°35′E
- Country: Russia
- Region: Vologda Oblast
- District: Sokolsky District
- Time zone: UTC+3:00

Knyazhevo (Russian: Княжево) is a rural locality (a village) in Dvinitskoye Rural Settlement, Sokolsky District, Vologda Oblast, Russia. The population was 15 as of 2002.

== Geography ==
Knyazhevo is located 47 km northeast of Sokol (the district's administrative centre) by road. Glebovo is the nearest rural locality.
