= Knyazevo, Arkhangelsky District =

Knyazevo Князево
- Village
- Location within Bashkortostan Location within Russia
- Coordinates: 54°27′N 56°29′E
- Country: Russia
- Region: Bashkortostan
- District: Arkhangelsky District
- Time zone: UTC+5:00

Knyazevo (Russian: Князево) is a rural locality (a village) in Irnykshinsky Selsoviet, Arkhangelsky District, Bashkortostan, Russia. The population was 20 as of 2010. There are 10 streets.

== Geography ==
Knyazevo is located 24 km northwest of Arkhangelskoye (the district's administrative centre) by road. Kuyashkino is the nearest rural locality.
