= Sakartsi =

- Village
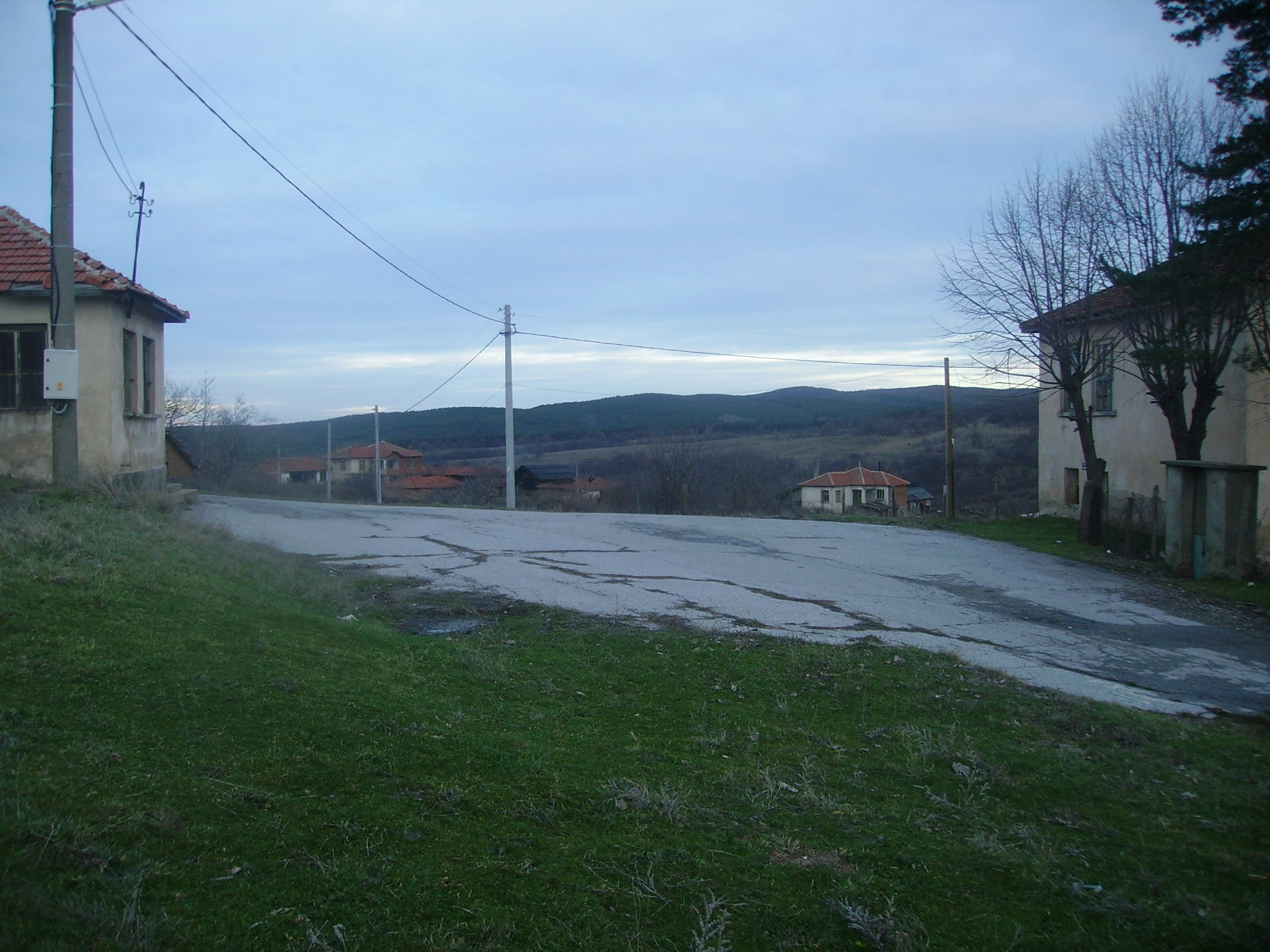
- Sakarzi village Bulgaria

- Location within Bulgaria
- Coordinates: 42°05′N 26°18′E
- Country: Bulgaria
- Province: Haskovo Province
- Municipality: Topolovgrad
- Time zone: UTC+2 (EET)
  - Summer (DST): UTC+3 (EEST)

Sakartsi is a village in the municipality of Topolovgrad, in Haskovo Province, in southern Bulgaria.
