= Chukarovo =

- Village
- Location within Bulgaria
- Coordinates: 42°09′N 26°24′E
- Country: Bulgaria
- Province: Haskovo Province
- Municipality: Topolovgrad
- Time zone: UTC+2 (EET)
  - Summer (DST): UTC+3 (EEST)

Chukarovo (Bulgarian: Чукарово, Greek: Τσεκούρκιοϊ) is a village in the municipality of Topolovgrad, in Haskovo Province, in southern Bulgaria.
