= Knyazevo, Ufa, Republic of Bashkortostan =

Knyazevo Князево
- Village
- Location within Bashkortostan Location within Russia
- Coordinates: 54°47′N 56°14′E
- Country: Russia
- Region: Bashkortostan
- District: Ufa
- Time zone: UTC+5:00

Knyazevo (Russian: Князево) is a rural locality (a village) in Ufa, Bashkortostan, Russia. The population was 891 as of 2010. There are 13 streets.
