= Ovcharitsa =

Location
- Country: Bulgaria

Physical characteristics
- Source
  - location: Svetiiliyski Heights
  - coordinates: 42°25′1.92″N 26°10′3″E
  - elevation: 310 m (1,020 ft)
- Mouth
  - location: Sazliyka
  - coordinates: 42°10′55.92″N 25°54′20.88″E
  - elevation: 94 m (308 ft)
- Length: 72 km (45 mi)
- Basin size: 636 km^{2} (246 sq mi)

Basin features
- Progression: Sazliyka→ Maritsa

The Ovcharitsa (Bulgarian: Овчарица) is a river in southern Bulgaria, a left tributary of the river Sazliyka, itself a left tributary of the Maritsa. With a length of 72 km, it is the largest tributary of the Sazliyka.

The river takes its source at an altitude of 310 m in the Svetiiliyski Heights at 1 km east of their highest point Ostrata Vila (416 m). Until the village of Zlatari it flows in a deep valley and then enters the Upper Thracian Plain. It flows southwards until flowing into the Ovcharitsa Reservoir. Downstream from the dam, the Ovcharitsa turns southwest and passes through the open-put coal mines of the Maritsa Iztok Complex, where its bed is completely corrected. The river flows into the Sazliyka at an altitude of 94 m about 1.3 km to the southwest of the village of Lyubenovo.

Its drainage basin covers a territory of 656 km^{2} or 19.6% of the Sazliyka's total.

The Ovcharitsa has predominantly rain feed with high water in January–May and low water in July–October.

The river flows in Sliven, Yambol and Stara Zagora Provinces. There are three villages along its course: Prohorovo in Nova Zagora Municipality of Sliven Province, and Kovachevo and Troyanovo in Radnevo Municipality of Stara Zagora Province. The waters of the Ovcharitsa are utilised for irrigation in its upper course and industrial water supply for the Maritsa Iztok Complex in its lower course.
