= Dobroselets =

- Village
- Location within Bulgaria
- Coordinates: 42°09′N 26°19′E
- Country: Bulgaria
- Province: Haskovo Province
- Municipality: Topolovgrad
- Time zone: UTC+2 (EET)
  - Summer (DST): UTC+3 (EEST)

Dobroselets is a village in the municipality of Topolovgrad, in Haskovo Province, in southern Bulgaria. It is located in the north slope of Sakar mountain at about 10 km north of Topolovgrad, 28 km west of Elhovo and 55 km southwest of Yambol. It is located at an altitude of 191 m, and has a population of 130 people.
