= Vladimirovo, Haskovo Province =

- Village
- Location within Bulgaria
- Coordinates: 42.1333°N 26.1500°E
- Country: Bulgaria
- Province: Haskovo Province
- Municipality: Topolovgrad
- Time zone: UTC+2 (EET)
  - Summer (DST): UTC+3 (EEST)

Vladimirovo, Haskovo Province is a village in the municipality of Topolovgrad, in Haskovo Province, in southern Bulgaria.
