= Pchela =

- Location of Elhovo
- Coordinates: 42°18′N 26°48′E
- Country: Bulgaria
- Province (Oblast): Yambol

Government
  - Mayor: Georgi Hadzhiev (IMRO)
- Elevation: 106 m (348 ft)

Population (2008)
  - Total: 445
- Time zone: UTC+2 (EET)
  - Summer (DST): UTC+3 (EEST)
- Postal Code: 8718
- Area code: 047204
- License plate: Y

Pchela is a village in Elhovo Municipality, Yambol Province, southeastern Bulgaria. The village is situated approximately 8 km west of Elhovo. Its Bulgarian name is Пчела, meaning “bee”. The village has also been known by the former name Isebeglyi. <

Geography

Pchela is located in the southeastern part of Bulgaria, within the administrative area of Elhovo Municipality. The village lies in the wider Tundzha region, an area associated with the middle valley of the Tundzha River.

The village has an elevation of approximately 106 metres. Its postal code is 8718, and its area code is 047204.

History

The settlement was formerly known as Isebeglyi. According to the existing description of the village, its location was changed twice during the 18th century because of the spread of plagues. Further details about the dates of these changes and the earlier settlement locations require additional historical sources.

Population

In 2008, Pchela had a population of 445 according to the figures cited in the existing article. More recent address-registration data published in 2026 records 407 residents with permanent addresses and 388 with current addresses. These figures are not directly comparable to a census population, because they measure different types of registration.

Local administration

Pchela is part of Elhovo Municipality in Yambol Province. The village is listed in Bulgaria’s National Register of Populated Places under the code 58801.
