= Knyazhevo, Haskovo Province =

Knyazhevo
- Village
- Location within Bulgaria
- Coordinates: 42.1000°N 26.5000°E
- Country: Bulgaria
- Province: Haskovo Province
- Municipality: Topolovgrad
- Time zone: UTC+2 (EET)
  - Summer (DST): UTC+3 (EEST)

Knyazhevo (Bulgarian: Княжево [ˈknʲaʒɛvo]) is a village in the municipality of Topolovgrad, in Haskovo Province, in southern Bulgaria.
