= Sazliyka =

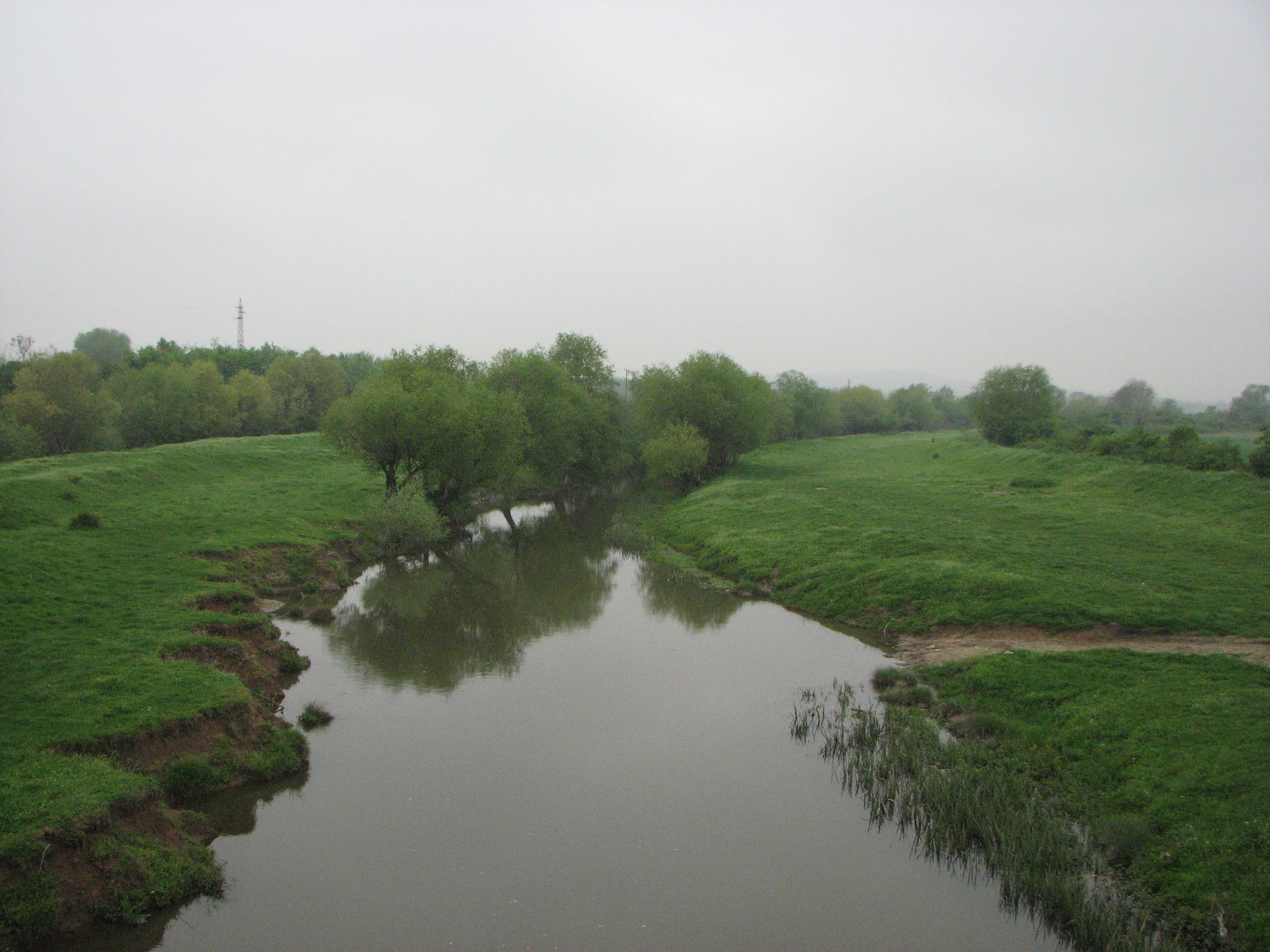
- The Sazliyka south of Kaloyanovets

Location
- Country: Bulgaria

Physical characteristics
- Source
  - location: Sredna Gora
  - coordinates: 42°30′51.12″N 25°23′35.12″E
  - elevation: 651 m (2,136 ft)
- Mouth
  - location: Maritsa
  - coordinates: 42°1′50.88″N 25°52′27.84″E
  - elevation: 78 m (256 ft)
- Length: 145 km (90 mi)
- Basin size: 3,239 km^{2} (1,251 sq mi)

Basin features
- Progression: Maritsa→ Aegean Sea

The Sazliyka or Rakitnitsa (Bulgarian: Сазлийка, pronounced [sɐzˈlijkɐ]; also transliterated Sazlijka or Sazliika) is a river in southeastern Bulgaria, a left tributary of the Maritsa. It originates in the Sarnena Sredna Gora mountain range. In its upper course until Radnevo, it is also known as the Rakitnitsa or Syuyutliyka. The river is 145 kilometres in length and is the fifth longest in the Maritsa drainage, following the Tundzha (390 km), the Arda (290 km), the Ergene (281 km) and the Topolnitsa (155 km).

The name is thought to be derived from the Ottoman Turkish saz, "bulrush", with a Bulgarian feminine suffix. The name of its upper course, Syuyutliyka, is also from a Turkish root, söğüt, "osier", while Rakitnitsa is its Bulgarian translation, the equivalent word for "osier" being rakita.

== Geography ==
The river takes its source under the name Toplitsite at an altitude of 651 m some 1.5 km southwest of the summit of Ruya (812 m) in the Sredna Gora mountain range. Until the village of Kazanka it flows southwards and then turns east. Downstream of the village of Starozagorski bani the river heads south-southwest and after receiving its tributary the Chatalka turns southeast. It reaches the Upper Thracian Plain at the villages of Lyaskovo and Rakitnitsa. Throughout its course in the mountains its valley is deep and forested. In the plains the riverbed is corrected with protective dikes. In the Upper Thracian Plain the Sazliyka takes several more turns — east downstream of Arnautito, southeast downstream of Sarnevo and south after Radnevo. It flows into the Maritsa at an altitude of 78 m about 1.7 km east of the town of Simeonovgrad. The river receives numerous tributaries, the most important being the Ovcharitsa (72 km), the Sokolitsa (61 km) and the Blatnitsa (54 km), all of them left.

Its drainage basin covers a territory of 3,239 km^{2} or 6.1% of the Maritsa's total and borders the drainage basins of the Omurovska reka, Tekirska reka, Martinka and Arpadere to the west and southwest, and the Tundzha to the north and east, all of them left tributaries of the Maritsa.

The Sazliyka has predominantly rain feed with high water in January–April and low water in July–October. The average annual flow near the town of Galabovo is 18 m^{3}/s. Some sections along its course are covered with riparian forests of poplar and willow.

== Fauna ==
A 2009–2012 study identified 16 autochthonous fish species in the lower course of the Sazliyka: northern pike, common bleak, round-scaled barbel, Prussian carp, Eurasian carp, Vardar nase, Aegean gudgeon, Orpheus dace, European bitterling, common roach, Macedonian vimba, Struma spined lorch, wels catfish, European perch, zander and western tubenose goby.

== Settlements and economy ==
The Sazliyka flows in Haskovo and Stara Zagora Provinces. There are two towns and 14 villages along its course. In Stara Zagora Province are located Kazanka, Starozagorski bani, Lyaskovo, Rakitnitsa, Arnaytito, Kaloyanovets and Badeshte in Stara Zagora Municipality, Kolarovo, Bozduganovo, Dinya, Topolyane, Radnevo (town), Beli Bryag and Lyubenovo in Radnevo Municipality, as well as Galabovo (town) in Galabovo Municipality. The only settlement in Haskovo Province is the village of Navasen in Simeonovgrad Municipality.

A 31.1 km stretch of the third class III-554 road Nova Zagora–Radnevo–Harmanli follows its valley between Radnevo and Simeonovgrad. Along the same route passes a section of the Simeonovgrad–Nova Zagora railway. Its waters are utilised for irrigation for the intensive agriculture in the Upper Thracian Plain, as well as for industrial water supply.
