= Orlov dol =

Orlov Dol
- Village
- Location within Bulgaria
- Coordinates: 42°07′N 26°11′E
- Country: Bulgaria
- Province: Haskovo Province
- Municipality: Topolovgrad

Population (2011)
  - Total: 485
- 2014 estimate is 446
- Time zone: UTC+2 (EET)
  - Summer (DST): UTC+3 (EEST)
- Website: orlovdol.blogspot.com

Orlov Dol is a village in the municipality of Topolovgrad, in Haskovo Province, in southern Bulgaria.

== History ==
The village's previous name was Minchevo.

In the nineteenth century, the Bulgarian revolutionary Vasil Levski allegedly visited the village three times, in 1870, 1871, and 1872.
