= Topolovgrad =

Topolovgrad Тополовград
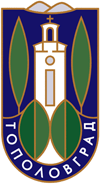
- Coat of arms

- Location of Topolovgrad
- Coordinates: 42°5′N 26°20′E
- Country: Bulgaria
- Provinces (Oblast): Haskovo

Government
  - Mayor: Bozhin Bozhinov
- Elevation: 311 m (1,020 ft)

Population (2020)
  - Total: 5,131
- Time zone: UTC+2 (EET)
  - Summer (DST): UTC+3 (EEST)
- Postal Code: 6560
- Area code: 0470

Topolovgrad (Bulgarian: Тополовград [toˈpɔlovɡrat], lit. 'town of poplars'; Greek: Καβακλί Kavakli) is a town in south-central Bulgaria, part of Haskovo Province, situated at the northern foot of the Sakar Mountain. It is the administrative centre of the homonymous Topolovgrad Municipality.

== Etymology ==
Until 1934 the town was known as Kavakli, a name deriving from the Turkish word kavak, "poplar", under this name it was also known by its Greek inhabitants.

== History ==
Topolovgrad and the surrounding area have been inhabited since ancient times, as evidenced by the dolmens found at Hlyabovo and the Paleokastro fortress that may have been built by the Thracians.

Until the early 20th century, the town was predominantly inhabited by Greeks (96 percent) and hosted Greek schools and churches. Although a Greek majority town, after 1906 the Bulgarian government appointed the first Bulgarian mayor. From 1906 to 1925, about 22,000 Greeks left the town and its surroundings and settled in Greek Macedonia. They were replaced by groups of Bulgarian refugees from Western Thrace, Eastern Thrace, Asia Minor and Macedonia. The Greek dialect of Topolovgrad is still spoken by some descendants in several villages of Greek Macedonia (see the video documentation from Koufalia village by Thede Kahl and Sotirios Rousiakis).

== People ==
- Nako Baev - artist
- Evelin Banev "Brendo" - self-made businessman, wrestler
- Delko Karadelkov - chairman, Bulgarian Journalists' Union, 1976
- Krum Krumov - writer and philologist

== Gallery ==
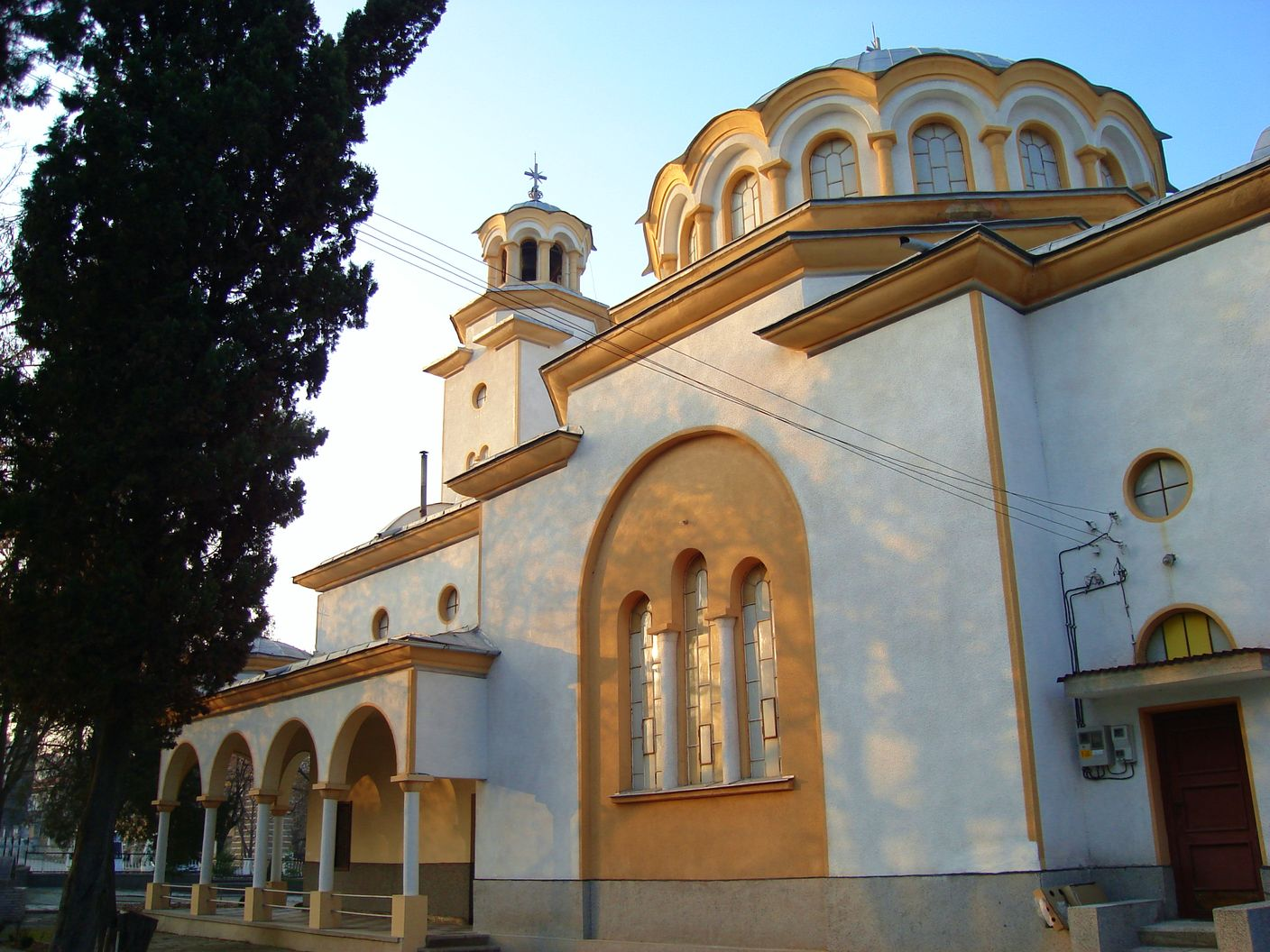
Holy Theotokos Eastern Orthodox Church

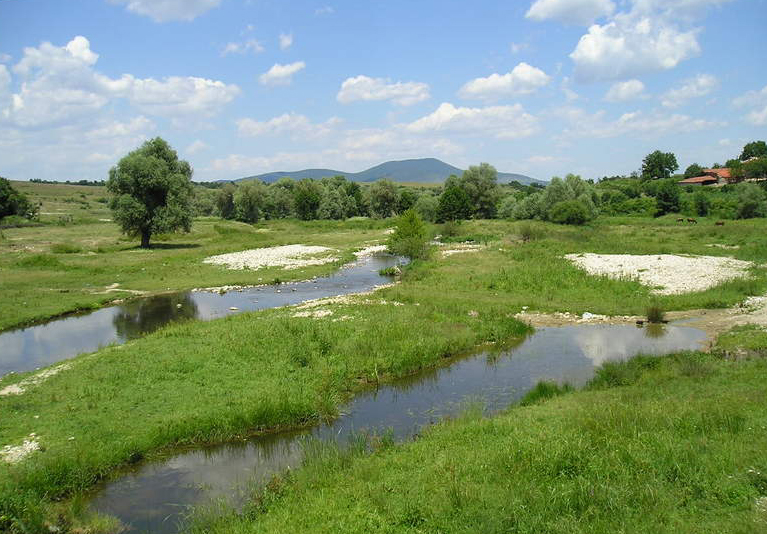
Monastery Heights, close to the town

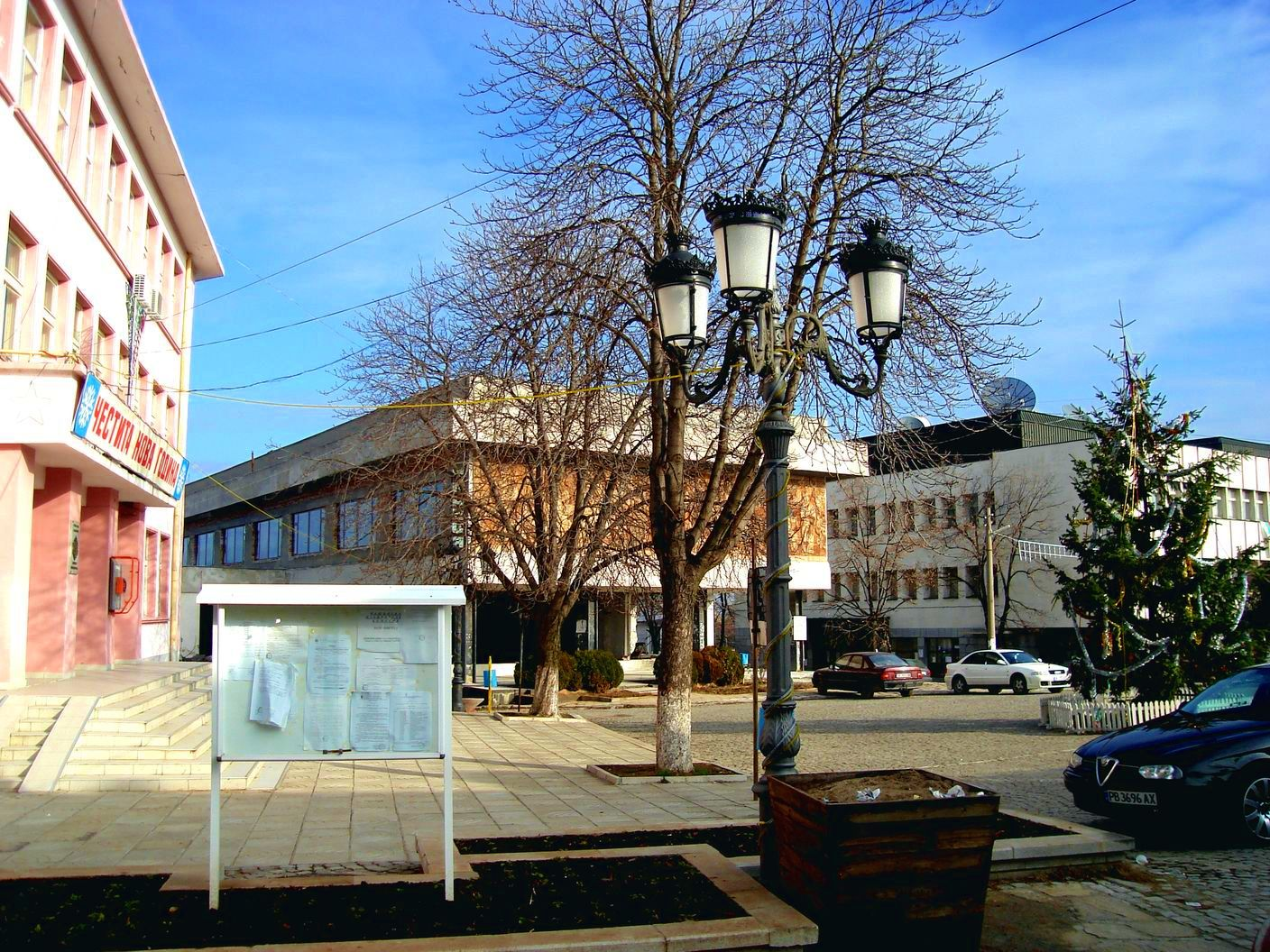
Town center, Osvobozhdenie Square

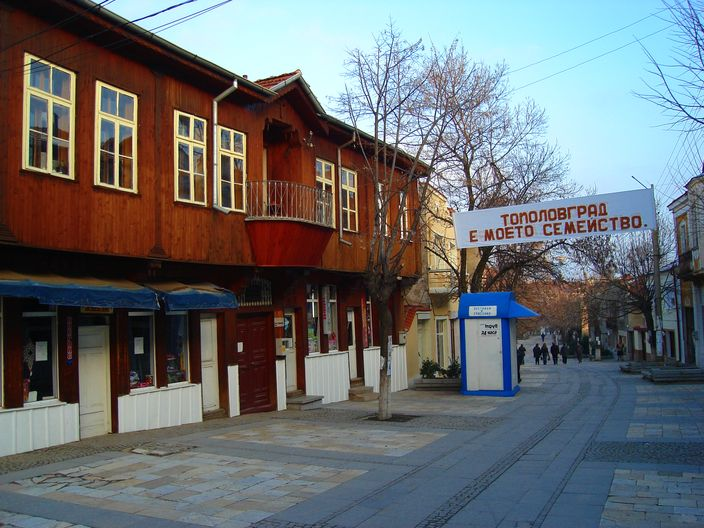
Town center, Bulgaria street

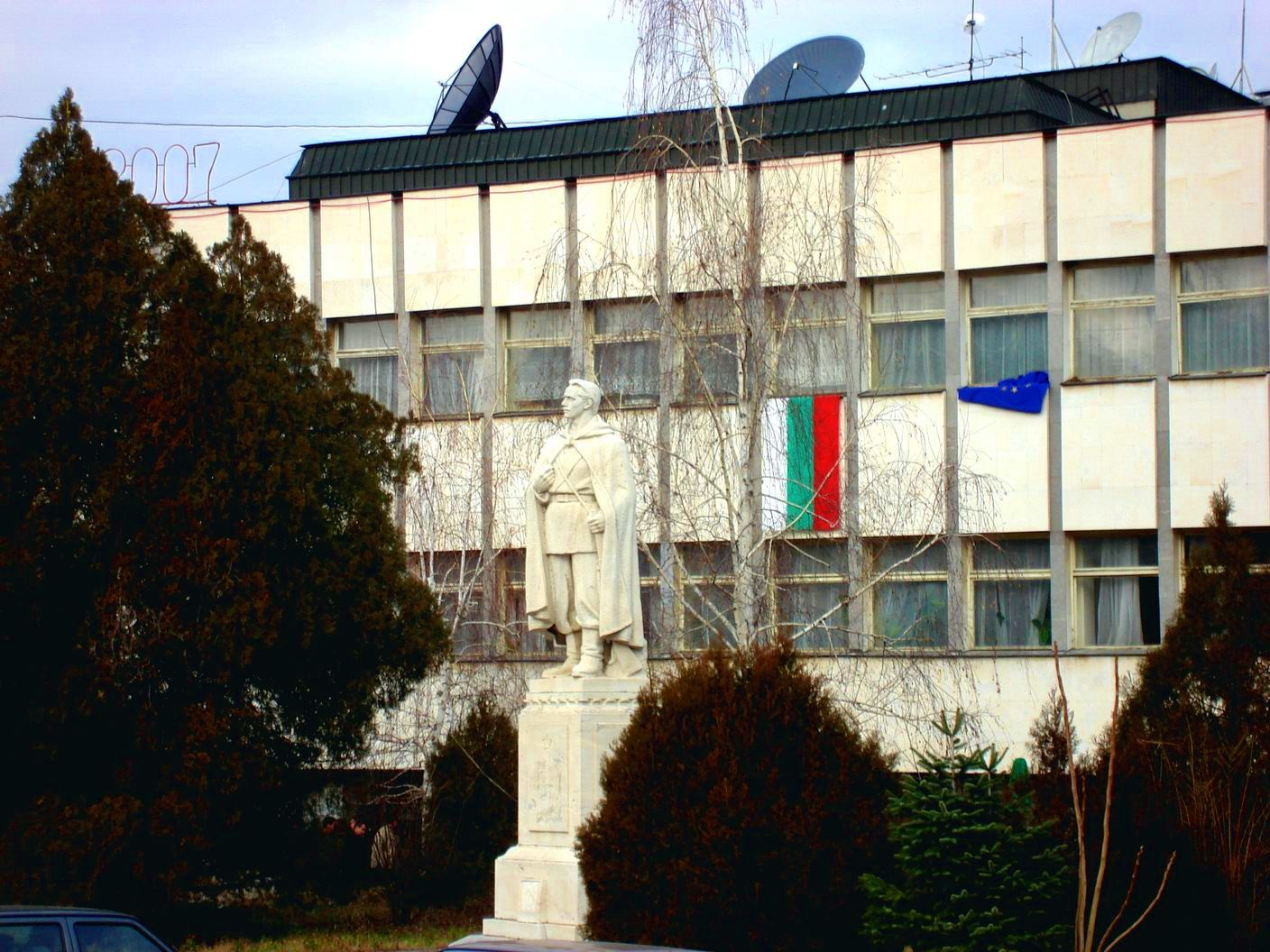
Saints Cyril and Methodius community center in Topolovgrad
