= List of rivers of Bulgaria =

Map of rivers, drainage divide and main drainage basins in Bulgaria Danube a1 Timok a2 Topolovets a3 Voynishka reka a4 Vidbol a5 Archar a6 Skomlya a7 Lom a8 Tsibritsa a9 Ogosta a10 Iskar a11 Vit a12 Osam a13 Barata a14 Yantra a15 Rusenski Lom a16 Topchiyska reka a17 Tsaratsar a18 Senkovets a19 Kanagyol a20 Suha reka a21 Nishava Black sea b0 Shablenska reka b1 Batova reka b2 Provadiyska reka b3 Kamchiya b18 Fandakliyska reka b4 Dvoynitsa b5 Hadzhiyska reka b6 Aheloy b7 Aytoska reka b8 Chukarska reka b9 Rusokastrenska reka b10 Sredetska reka b11 Fakiyska reka b12 Izvorska reka b13 Ropotamo b14 Dyavolska reka b15 Kitenska reka b16 Veleka b17 Rezovska reka Aegean sea c1 Struma c2 Mesta c3 Maritsa c4 Arda c5 Tundzha c6 Luda reka

This is a list of rivers in Bulgaria, organised geographically, taken clockwise from the westernmost tributaries of the Danube drainage. Tributaries are listed down the page in a downstream direction, i.e. the first tributary listed is closest to the source, and tributaries of tributaries are treated similarly. The main stem (or principal) river of a catchment is labelled as (MS), right-bank tributaries are indicated by (R), left-bank tributaries by (L). Note that in general usage, the 'right or left bank of a river' refers to the right or left hand bank, as seen when looking downstream. The list encompasses most of the main rivers of Bulgaria. It includes rivers shared with other countries. There is also a list of rivers over 50 km. The Bulgarian word for river, река (transliteration reka) is often a part of the river names in the country.

== Overview ==
There are 540 rivers in Bulgaria. The longest river in Bulgaria is the Danube (2,888 km), which spans most of the country's northern border for a length of 470 km. The longest one to run through the country (and also the deepest) is the Maritsa (480 km), while the longest river that runs solely in Bulgaria is the Iskar (368 km).

The density of rivers is highest in the mountain areas and lowest in Dobrudzha, the Danubian Plain and the Upper Thracian Plain. There are two catchment basins: the Black Sea (57% of the territory and 42% of the rivers) and the Aegean Sea (43% of the territory and 58% of the rivers) basins. The territory of Bulgaria is 110,994 km^{2}, of which 63,270 km^{2} fall within the Black Sea catchment bason, divided between the Danube (49,950 km^{2}) and Black Sea Coast drainage (13,320 km^{2}), and 47,730 km^{2} fall within the Aegean Sea basin, divided between the Maritsa (34,166 km^{2}), Mesta (2,767 km^{2}) and Struma (10,797 km^{2}) drainage.

The Balkan Mountains divide Bulgaria into two nearly equal drainage systems. The larger system drains northward to the Black Sea, mainly by way of the Danube. This system includes the entire Danubian Plain and a stretch of land running 48–80 km inland from the coastline in the south. The Danube gets slightly more than 4% of its total volume from its Bulgarian tributaries. As it flows along the northern border, the Danube averages 1.6 to 2.4 km in width. The river's highest water levels usually occur during the May floods; it is frozen over an average of 40 days per year. The longest river located entirely in Bulgarian territory, the Iskar, with a length of 368 km and a catchment area of 8,640 km^{2}, is the only Bulgarian Danubian tributary that does not rise in the Balkan Mountains. Instead, the Iskar has its origin in the Rila Mountains. It passes through Sofia's eastern suburbs and crosses the Balkan Mountains through a spectacular 65 km–long gorge. Other important tributaries of the Danube include the rivers Lom, Ogosta, Vit, Osam and Yantra. The longest river flowing directly to the Black Sea is the Kamchiya (254 km), while other rivers from north to south include the Batova, Dvoynitsa, Aheloy, Sredetska reka, Ropotamo, Veleka, Rezovo, etc.

The Aegean Sea catchment basin drains the Thracian Plain and most of the higher lands to the south and southwest. Several major rivers flow directly to the Aegean Sea. Many of their tributaries fall swiftly from the mountains and have cut deep, scenic gorges. The 480 km–long Maritsa (of them 321 km in Bulgaria) and its tributaries drain all of the western Thracian Plain, most of Sredna Gora, the southern slopes of the Balkan Mountains, and the northern slopes of the eastern Rhodopes. After it leaves Bulgaria, the Maritsa forms most of the Greco-Turkish border. Maritsa's major tributaries are the Tundzha, Arda, Topolnitsa, Vacha, Stryama, etc. The other Bulgarian rivers flowing directly to the Aegean are the Struma and the Mesta.

== Black Sea Drainage ==
=== Danube Drainage ===
- Danube (MS)
  - (outside Bulgaria) Great Morava (R)
    - (outside Bulgaria) South Morava (L)
      - Nišava (R)
        - Gaberska reka (L)
        - Erma (L)
        - (outside Bulgaria) Temštica (R)
          - Visochitsa (R)
  - Timok (R)
  - Topolovets (R)
    - Rabrovska reka (L)
    - Deleynska reka (L)
  - Voynishka reka (R)
  - Vidbol (R)
  - Archar (R)
    - Salashka reka (R)
  - Skomlya (R)
  - Lom (R)
    - Stakevska reka (L)
      - Chuprenska reka (R)
    - Nechinska bara (L)
  - Tsibritsa (R)
    - Tsibar (L)
    - Dushilnitsa (L)
  - Ogosta (R)
    - Prevalska reka (L)
    - Dalgodelska Ogosta (R)
    - Zlatitsa (R)
    - Barzia (R)
    - Shugavitsa (R)
    - Botunya (R)
    - Ribine (R)
    - Skat (R)
      - Barzina (L)
  - Iskar (R)
    - Cherni Iskar (L)
    - Beli Iskar (R)
    - Musalenska Bistritsa (R)
    - Palakaria (L)
    - Shipochanitsa (R)
    - Zheleznishka reka (L)
    - Vitoshka Bistritsa (L)
    - Perlovska (L)
      - Boyanska reka (L)
      - Vladaya (L)
    - Lesnovska reka (R)
    - Kakach (L)
    - Blato (L)
    - Batuliyska reka (R)
    - Iskretska reka (L)
    - Gabrovnitsa (R)
    - Malki Iskar (R)
      - Bebresh (L)
    - Zlatna Panega (R)
    - Gostilya (L)
  - Vit (R)
    - Cherni Vit (L)
    - Beli Vit (R)
    - Kalnik (R)
    - Kamenitsa (R)
    - Chernyalka (R)
    - Tuchenitsa (R)
  - Osam (R)
    - Beli Osam (L)
    - Cherni Osam (R)
    - Komanska reka (L)
    - Suha reka (L)
    - Shavarna (L)
    - Lomya (R)
  - Barata (R)
  - Yantra (R)
    - Belitsa (R)
      - Dryanovska reka (L)
    - Stara reka (R)
      - Golyama reka (R)
      - Veselina (L)
        - Zlatarishka reka (R)
    - Rositsa (L)
      - Vidima (L)
      - Negovanka (R)
      - Bohot (R)
    - Eliyska reka (L)
    - Studena (L)
  - Rusenski Lom (R)
    - Cherni Lom (L)
      - Baniski Lom (L)
    - Beli Lom (R)
      - Hlebarovska reka (R)
      - Malki Lom (R)
  - Topchiyska reka (R)
  - Tsaratsar (R)
  - Senkovets (R)
  - Kanagyol (R)
    - Harsovska reka (R)
  - Suha reka (R)
    - Karamandere (L)
    - Dobrichka reka (R)

=== Black Sea Coast ===
- Shablenska reka (Ms)
- Batova (Ms)
- Provadiya (Ms)
  - Matnishka reka (R)
  - Kriva reka (L)
  - Devnya (L)
- Kamchiya (Ms)
  - Golyama Kamchiya (L)
    - Eleshnitsa (R)
    - Vrana (L)
    - Poroyna (L)
    - Stara reka (L)
    - Brestova reka (R)
  - Luda Kamchiya (R)
    - Kotlenska reka (L)
    - Medvenska reka (L)
  - Eleshnitsa (R)
- Dvoynitsa (Ms)
- Hadzhiyska reka (Ms)
- Aheloy (Ms)
- Aytoska reka (Ms)
- Chukarska reka (Ms)
- Rusokastrenska reka (Ms)
- Sredetska reka (Ms)
  - Gospodarevska reka (L)
- Fakiyska reka (Ms)
- Izvorska reka (Ms)
- Ropotamo (Ms)
- Dyavolska reka (Ms)
- Karaagach (Ms)
- Veleka (Ms)
  - Mladezhka reka (L)
- Rezovo (Ms)

== Aegean Sea Drainage ==
- Maritsa (Ms)
  - Ibar (R)
  - Yadenitsa (R)
  - Chepinska reka (R)
    - Matnitsa (R)
  - Topolnitsa (L)
    - Bunovska reka (R)
    - Mativir (R)
  - Luda Yana (L)
  - Stara reka (R)
  - Vacha (R)
    - Shirokolashka (R)
    - Devinska reka (L)
    - Gashnya (L)
  - Potoka (L)
  - Parvenetska reka (R)
  - Pyasachnik (L)
  - Chepelare (R)
    - Yugovska reka (R)
      - Sushitsa (R)
  - Stryama (R)
    - Byala reka (L)
  - Srebra (L)
  - Cherkezitsa (R)
  - Brezovska reka (L)
  - Omurovska reka (L)
  - Mechka (R)
  - Tekirska reka (L)
  - Kayaliyka (R)
  - Starata reka (L)
  - Banska (R)
  - Merichlerska reka (L)
  - Martinka (L)
  - Arpadere (L)
  - Sazliyka (L)
    - Blatnitsa (L)
    - Ovcharitsa (L)
    - Sokolitsa (L)
  - Harmanliyska reka (R)
    - Haskovska reka (L)
  - Biserska reka (R)
  - Golyama reka (L)
  - Levchenska reka (L)
  - Arda (R)
    - Cherna (L)
    - Malka Arda (L)
    - Borovitsa (L)
    - Varbitsa (R)
    - Perperek (L)
    - Krumovitsa (R)
    - Aterenska reka (R)
  - Tundzha (L)
    - Tazha (L)
    - Maglizhka reka (L)
    - Asenovska reka (L)
    - Mochuritsa (L)
    - Popovska reka (L)
      - Krushevska reka (R)
      - Arapliyska reka (L)
        - Boyalashka reka (R)
    - Sinapovska reka (R)
      - Kalnitsa (L)
  - Luda reka (R)
    - Byala Reka (L)
- Mesta (Ms)
  - Cherna Mesta (L)
  - Byala Mesta (R)
  - Iztok (R)
    - Glazne (R)
      - Banderitsa (L)
      - Demyanitsa (R)
  - Disilitsa (R)
  - Retizhe (R)
  - Kanina (L)
    - Vishteritsa (R)
  - Chechka Bistritsa (L)
  - Dospat (L)
    - Sarnena reka (L)
- Struma (Ms)
  - Konska reka (R)
  - Arkata (L)
  - Treklyanska reka (R)
  - Dragovishtitsa (R)
  - Sovolyanska Bistritsa (R)
  - Eleshnitsa (R)
  - Dzherman (L)
  - Rilska River (L)
  - Blagoevgradska Bistritsa (L)
  - Gradevska reka (L)
  - Vlahina reka (L)
  - Lebnitsa (R)
  - Sandanska Bistritsa (L)
  - Strumeshnitsa (R)
  - Melnishka reka (L)
  - Pirinska Bistritsa (L)

== List of rivers over 50 km ==
No.	Image	River	Length	Length in Bulgaria	Basin	Annual flow	Map
1		Danube	2,852 km (1,772 mi)	470 km (290 mi)	802,266 km^{2} (309,757 sq mi)	6,500 m^{3}/s (230,000 cu ft/s)	List of rivers of Bulgaria is located in Bulgaria
2		Maritsa	472 km (293 mi)	322 km (200 mi)	53,000 km^{2} (20,000 sq mi)	234 m^{3}/s (8,300 cu ft/s)	List of rivers of Bulgaria is located in Bulgaria
3		Struma	415 km (258 mi)	290 km (180 mi)	17,300 km^{2} (6,700 sq mi)	76.2 m^{3}/s (2,690 cu ft/s)	List of rivers of Bulgaria is located in Bulgaria
4		Tundzha	390 km (240 mi)	350 km (220 mi)	8,429 km^{2} (3,254 sq mi)	39.7 m^{3}/s (1,400 cu ft/s)	List of rivers of Bulgaria is located in Bulgaria
5		Iskar	368 km (229 mi)	368 km (229 mi)	8,646 km^{2} (3,338 sq mi)	54.5 m^{3}/s (1,920 cu ft/s)	List of rivers of Bulgaria is located in Bulgaria
6		Osam	314 km (195 mi)	314 km (195 mi)	2,824 km^{2} (1,090 sq mi)	12.6 m^{3}/s (440 cu ft/s)	List of rivers of Bulgaria is located in Bulgaria
7		Yantra	285 km (177 mi)	285 km (177 mi)	7,862 km^{2} (3,036 sq mi)	47 m^{3}/s (1,700 cu ft/s)	List of rivers of Bulgaria is located in Bulgaria
8		Arda	272 km (169 mi)	241 km (150 mi)	5,795 km^{2} (2,237 sq mi)	77 m^{3}/s (2,700 cu ft/s)	List of rivers of Bulgaria is located in Bulgaria
9		Mesta	246 km (153 mi)	126 km (78 mi)	3,447 km^{2} (1,331 sq mi)	29.85 m^{3}/s (1,054 cu ft/s)	List of rivers of Bulgaria is located in Bulgaria
10		Kamchiya	245 km (152 mi)	245 km (152 mi)	5,358 km^{2} (2,069 sq mi)	27.7 m^{3}/s (980 cu ft/s)	List of rivers of Bulgaria is located in Bulgaria
11		Nišava	218 km (135 mi)	40 km (25 mi)	3,950 km^{2} (1,530 sq mi)	36 m^{3}/s (1,300 cu ft/s)	List of rivers of Bulgaria is located in Bulgaria
12		Timok	202 km (126 mi)	15 km (9.3 mi)	4,630 km^{2} (1,790 sq mi)	40 m^{3}/s (1,400 cu ft/s)	List of rivers of Bulgaria is located in Bulgaria
13		Luda Kamchiya	202 km (126 mi)	202 km (126 mi)	1,612 km^{2} (622 sq mi)	11.4 m^{3}/s (400 cu ft/s)	List of rivers of Bulgaria is located in Bulgaria
14		Vit	189 km (117 mi)	189 km (117 mi)	3,225 km^{2} (1,245 sq mi)	14 m^{3}/s (490 cu ft/s)	List of rivers of Bulgaria is located in Bulgaria
15		Rositsa	164 km (102 mi)	164 km (102 mi)	2,260 km^{2} (870 sq mi)	12.3 m^{3}/s (430 cu ft/s)	List of rivers of Bulgaria is located in Bulgaria
16		Topolnitsa	155 km (96 mi)	155 km (96 mi)	1,789 km^{2} (691 sq mi)	10 m^{3}/s (350 cu ft/s)	List of rivers of Bulgaria is located in Bulgaria
17		Beli Lom	147 km (91 mi)	147 km (91 mi)	1,549 km^{2} (598 sq mi)	2.09 m^{3}/s (74 cu ft/s)	List of rivers of Bulgaria is located in Bulgaria
18		Veleka	147 km (91 mi)	123 km (76 mi)	995 km^{2} (384 sq mi)	9.41 m^{3}/s (332 cu ft/s)	List of rivers of Bulgaria is located in Bulgaria
19		Sazliyka	145 km (90 mi)	145 km (90 mi)	3,239 km^{2} (1,251 sq mi)	18 m^{3}/s (640 cu ft/s)	List of rivers of Bulgaria is located in Bulgaria
20		Ogosta	141 km (88 mi)	141 km (88 mi)	3,157 km^{2} (1,219 sq mi)	25.4 m^{3}/s (900 cu ft/s)	List of rivers of Bulgaria is located in Bulgaria
21		Skat	144 km (89 mi)	144 km (89 mi)	1,074 km^{2} (415 sq mi)	1.7 m^{3}/s (60 cu ft/s)	List of rivers of Bulgaria is located in Bulgaria
22		Cherni Lom	130 km (81 mi)	130 km (81 mi)	1,286 km^{2} (497 sq mi)		List of rivers of Bulgaria is located in Bulgaria
23		Suha reka	126 km (78 mi)	100 km (62 mi)	2,404 km^{2} (928 sq mi)	0.69 m^{3}/s (24 cu ft/s)	List of rivers of Bulgaria is located in Bulgaria
24		Provadiyska reka	119 km (74 mi)	119 km (74 mi)	2,132 km^{2} (823 sq mi)	2.4 m^{3}/s (85 cu ft/s)	List of rivers of Bulgaria is located in Bulgaria
25		Strumeshnitsa	114 km (71 mi)	33 km (21 mi)	1,900 km^{2} (730 sq mi)	12.5 m^{3}/s (440 cu ft/s)	List of rivers of Bulgaria is located in Bulgaria
26		Vacha	112 km (70 mi)	112 km (70 mi)	1,645 km^{2} (635 sq mi)	22 m^{3}/s (780 cu ft/s)	List of rivers of Bulgaria is located in Bulgaria
27		Rezovska reka	112 km (70 mi)	70 km (43 mi)	738 km^{2} (285 sq mi)		List of rivers of Bulgaria is located in Bulgaria
28		Kanagyol	110 km (68 mi)	100 km (62 mi)	1,745 km^{2} (674 sq mi)	0.09 m^{3}/s (3.2 cu ft/s)	List of rivers of Bulgaria is located in Bulgaria
29		Stryama	110 km (68 mi)	110 km (68 mi)	1,394 km^{2} (538 sq mi)	8.56 m^{3}/s (302 cu ft/s)	List of rivers of Bulgaria is located in Bulgaria
30		Dospat	110 km (68 mi)	96 km (60 mi)	634 km^{2} (245 sq mi)	5.21 m^{3}/s (184 cu ft/s)	List of rivers of Bulgaria is located in Bulgaria
31		Tsaratsar	110 km (68 mi)	110 km (68 mi)	1,062 km^{2} (410 sq mi)	0.06 m^{3}/s (2.1 cu ft/s)	List of rivers of Bulgaria is located in Bulgaria
32		Luda reka	100 km (62 mi)	20 km (12 mi)	1,618 km^{2} (625 sq mi)		List of rivers of Bulgaria is located in Bulgaria
33		Varbitsa	98 km (61 mi)	98 km (61 mi)	1,203 km^{2} (464 sq mi)	22.6 m^{3}/s (800 cu ft/s)	List of rivers of Bulgaria is located in Bulgaria
34		Lom	93 km (58 mi)	93 km (58 mi)	1,240 km^{2} (480 sq mi)	7.39 m^{3}/s (261 cu ft/s)	List of rivers of Bulgaria is located in Bulgaria
35		Stara reka	92 km (57 mi)	92 km (57 mi)	2,458 km^{2} (949 sq mi)	15.8 m^{3}/s (560 cu ft/s)	List of rivers of Bulgaria is located in Bulgaria
36		Harmanliyska reka	92 km (57 mi)	92 km (57 mi)	956 km^{2} (369 sq mi)	5.47 m^{3}/s (193 cu ft/s)	List of rivers of Bulgaria is located in Bulgaria
37		Harsovska reka	91 km (57 mi)	91 km (57 mi)	1,096 km^{2} (423 sq mi)		List of rivers of Bulgaria is located in Bulgaria
38		Senkovets	91 km (57 mi)	91 km (57 mi)	553 km^{2} (214 sq mi)	1.7 m^{3}/s (60 cu ft/s)	List of rivers of Bulgaria is located in Bulgaria
39		Topchiyska reka	89 km (55 mi)	89 km (55 mi)	660 km^{2} (250 sq mi)		List of rivers of Bulgaria is located in Bulgaria
40		Tsibritsa	88 km (55 mi)	88 km (55 mi)	934 km^{2} (361 sq mi)	2.5 m^{3}/s (88 cu ft/s)	List of rivers of Bulgaria is located in Bulgaria
41		Fakiyska reka	87 km (54 mi)	87 km (54 mi)	641 km^{2} (247 sq mi)	4.84 m^{3}/s (171 cu ft/s)	List of rivers of Bulgaria is located in Bulgaria
42		Mochuritsa	86 km (53 mi)	86 km (53 mi)	1,278 km^{2} (493 sq mi)	2.7 m^{3}/s (95 cu ft/s)	List of rivers of Bulgaria is located in Bulgaria
43		Chepelarska reka	86 km (53 mi)	86 km (53 mi)	1,010 km^{2} (390 sq mi)	12 m^{3}/s (420 cu ft/s)	List of rivers of Bulgaria is located in Bulgaria
44		Malki Iskar	85 km (53 mi)	85 km (53 mi)	1,284 km^{2} (496 sq mi)	9.1 m^{3}/s (320 cu ft/s)	List of rivers of Bulgaria is located in Bulgaria
45		Chepinska reka	83 km (52 mi)	83 km (52 mi)	900 km^{2} (350 sq mi)	7.93 m^{3}/s (280 cu ft/s)	List of rivers of Bulgaria is located in Bulgaria
46		Golyama reka	74 km (46 mi)	74 km (46 mi)	864 km^{2} (334 sq mi)		List of rivers of Bulgaria is located in Bulgaria
47		Luda Yana	74 km (46 mi)	74 km (46 mi)	674 km^{2} (260 sq mi)	3.6 m^{3}/s (130 cu ft/s)	List of rivers of Bulgaria is located in Bulgaria
48		Erma	74 km (46 mi)	25 km (16 mi)		2.4 m^{3}/s (85 cu ft/s)	List of rivers of Bulgaria is located in Bulgaria
49		Pyasachnik	72 km (45 mi)	72 km (45 mi)	663 km^{2} (256 sq mi)	2.3 m^{3}/s (81 cu ft/s)	List of rivers of Bulgaria is located in Bulgaria
50		Ovcharitsa	72 km (45 mi)	72 km (45 mi)	636 km^{2} (246 sq mi)		List of rivers of Bulgaria is located in Bulgaria
51		Kalnitsa	72 km (45 mi)	72 km (45 mi)	577 km^{2} (223 sq mi)	1.65 m^{3}/s (58 cu ft/s)	List of rivers of Bulgaria is located in Bulgaria
52		Popovska reka	72 km (45 mi)	72 km (45 mi)	533 km^{2} (206 sq mi)	0.9 m^{3}/s (32 cu ft/s)	List of rivers of Bulgaria is located in Bulgaria
53		Visochitsa	71 km (44 mi)	17 km (11 mi)	820 km^{2} (320 sq mi)	0.15 km^{2} (0.058 sq mi)	List of rivers of Bulgaria is located in Bulgaria
54		Veselina	70 km (43 mi)	70 km (43 mi)	882 km^{2} (341 sq mi)	2.3 m^{3}/s (81 cu ft/s)	List of rivers of Bulgaria is located in Bulgaria
55		Dragovishtitsa	70 km (43 mi)	25 km (16 mi)	867 km^{2} (335 sq mi)	8.9 m^{3}/s (310 cu ft/s)	List of rivers of Bulgaria is located in Bulgaria
56		Byala reka	70 km (43 mi)	70 km (43 mi)	594 km^{2} (229 sq mi)	7.53 m^{3}/s (266 cu ft/s)	List of rivers of Bulgaria is located in Bulgaria
57		Gospodarevska reka	70 km (43 mi)	70 km (43 mi)	422 km^{2} (163 sq mi)		List of rivers of Bulgaria is located in Bulgaria
58		Dobrichka reka	70 km (43 mi)	70 km (43 mi)			List of rivers of Bulgaria is located in Bulgaria
59		Sredetska reka	69 km (43 mi)	69 km (43 mi)	985 km^{2} (380 sq mi)	2.8 m^{3}/s (99 cu ft/s)	List of rivers of Bulgaria is located in Bulgaria
60		Botunya	69 km (43 mi)	69 km (43 mi)	732 km^{2} (283 sq mi)	3.9 m^{3}/s (140 cu ft/s)	List of rivers of Bulgaria is located in Bulgaria
61		Vrana	68 km (42 mi)	68 km (42 mi)	938 km^{2} (362 sq mi)	2.74 m^{3}/s (97 cu ft/s)	List of rivers of Bulgaria is located in Bulgaria
62		Topolovets	68 km (42 mi)	68 km (42 mi)	583 km^{2} (225 sq mi)	1.23 m^{3}/s (43 cu ft/s)	List of rivers of Bulgaria is located in Bulgaria
63		Vidima	68 km (42 mi)	68 km (42 mi)	554 km^{2} (214 sq mi)	5.6 m^{3}/s (200 cu ft/s)	List of rivers of Bulgaria is located in Bulgaria
64		Karamandere	66 km (41 mi)	66 km (41 mi)	629 km^{2} (243 sq mi)		List of rivers of Bulgaria is located in Bulgaria
65		Lesnovska reka	65 km (40 mi)	65 km (40 mi)	1,096 km^{2} (423 sq mi)	4.7 m^{3}/s (170 cu ft/s)	List of rivers of Bulgaria is located in Bulgaria
66		Rusokastrenska reka	65 km (40 mi)	65 km (40 mi)	525 km^{2} (203 sq mi)		List of rivers of Bulgaria is located in Bulgaria
67		Vidbol	62 km (39 mi)	62 km (39 mi)	330 km^{2} (130 sq mi)	0.8 m^{3}/s (28 cu ft/s)	List of rivers of Bulgaria is located in Bulgaria
68		Mativir	61 km (38 mi)	61 km (38 mi)	412 km^{2} (159 sq mi)	1.5 m^{3}/s (53 cu ft/s)	List of rivers of Bulgaria is located in Bulgaria
69		Stara reka	61 km (38 mi)	61 km (38 mi)	350 km^{2} (140 sq mi)	2.74 m^{3}/s (97 cu ft/s)	List of rivers of Bulgaria is located in Bulgaria
70		Sokolitsa	61 km (38 mi)	61 km (38 mi)	343 km^{2} (132 sq mi)		List of rivers of Bulgaria is located in Bulgaria
71		Archar	59 km (37 mi)	59 km (37 mi)	365 km^{2} (141 sq mi)	1.5 m^{3}/s (53 cu ft/s)	List of rivers of Bulgaria is located in Bulgaria
72		Eleshnitsa	59 km (37 mi)	59 km (37 mi)	385 km^{2} (149 sq mi)	3.77 m^{3}/s (133 cu ft/s)	List of rivers of Bulgaria is located in Bulgaria
73		Dryanovska reka	59 km (37 mi)	59 km (37 mi)	336 km^{2} (130 sq mi)	2.06 m^{3}/s (73 cu ft/s)	List of rivers of Bulgaria is located in Bulgaria
74		Krumovitsa	58 km (36 mi)	58 km (36 mi)	671 km^{2} (259 sq mi)	9.34 m^{3}/s (330 cu ft/s)	List of rivers of Bulgaria is located in Bulgaria
75		Omurovska reka	58 km (36 mi)	58 km (36 mi)	305 km^{2} (118 sq mi)	0.85 m^{3}/s (30 cu ft/s)	List of rivers of Bulgaria is located in Bulgaria
76		Belitsa	57 km (35 mi)	57 km (35 mi)	740 km^{2} (290 sq mi)	2.2 m^{3}/s (78 cu ft/s)	List of rivers of Bulgaria is located in Bulgaria
77		Baniski Lom	57 km (35 mi)	57 km (35 mi)	581 km^{2} (224 sq mi)	1.58 m^{3}/s (56 cu ft/s)	List of rivers of Bulgaria is located in Bulgaria
78		Devinska reka	57 km (35 mi)	57 km (35 mi)	427 km^{2} (165 sq mi)	5 m^{3}/s (180 cu ft/s)	List of rivers of Bulgaria is located in Bulgaria
79		Malki Lom	57 km (35 mi)	57 km (35 mi)	338 km^{2} (131 sq mi)		List of rivers of Bulgaria is located in Bulgaria
80		Zlatarishka reka	57 km (35 mi)	57 km (35 mi)	187 km^{2} (72 sq mi)		List of rivers of Bulgaria is located in Bulgaria
81		Potoka	56 km (35 mi)	56 km (35 mi)	423 km^{2} (163 sq mi)		List of rivers of Bulgaria is located in Bulgaria
82		Martinka	55 km (34 mi)	55 km (34 mi)	395 km^{2} (153 sq mi)		List of rivers of Bulgaria is located in Bulgaria
83		Hadzhiyska reka	55 km (34 mi)	55 km (34 mi)	356 km^{2} (137 sq mi)	0.64 m^{3}/s (23 cu ft/s)	List of rivers of Bulgaria is located in Bulgaria
84		Voynishka reka	55 km (34 mi)	55 km (34 mi)	276 km^{2} (107 sq mi)	0.91 m^{3}/s (32 cu ft/s)	List of rivers of Bulgaria is located in Bulgaria
85		Blatnitsa	54 km (34 mi)	54 km (34 mi)	656 km^{2} (253 sq mi)		List of rivers of Bulgaria is located in Bulgaria
86		Pirinska Bistritsa	53 km (33 mi)	53 km (33 mi)	507 km^{2} (196 sq mi)	3.35 m^{3}/s (118 cu ft/s)	List of rivers of Bulgaria is located in Bulgaria
87		Brezovska reka	53 km (33 mi)	53 km (33 mi)	237 km^{2} (92 sq mi)		List of rivers of Bulgaria is located in Bulgaria
88		Dvoynitsa	52 km (32 mi)	52 km (32 mi)	479 km^{2} (185 sq mi)	7 m^{3}/s (250 cu ft/s)	List of rivers of Bulgaria is located in Bulgaria
89		Rilska River	51 km (32 mi)	51 km (32 mi)	393 km^{2} (152 sq mi)	6.26 m^{3}/s (221 cu ft/s)	List of rivers of Bulgaria is located in Bulgaria
90		Sovolyanska Bistritsa	51 km (32 mi)	51 km (32 mi)	300 km^{2} (120 sq mi)	2.29 m^{3}/s (81 cu ft/s)	List of rivers of Bulgaria is located in Bulgaria
91		Treklyanska reka	50 km (31 mi)	50 km (31 mi)			List of rivers of Bulgaria is located in Bulgaria
92		Rusenski Lom	50 km (31 mi)	50 km (31 mi)	2,874 km^{2} (1,110 sq mi)	5.6 m^{3}/s (200 cu ft/s)	List of rivers of Bulgaria is located in Bulgaria
93		Sinapovska reka	50 km (31 mi)	50 km (31 mi)	871 km^{2} (336 sq mi)	1.3 m^{3}/s (46 cu ft/s)	List of rivers of Bulgaria is located in Bulgaria
94		Zlatna Panega	50 km (31 mi)	50 km (31 mi)	350 km^{2} (140 sq mi)	4 m^{3}/s (140 cu ft/s)	List of rivers of Bulgaria is located in Bulgaria
95		Lebnitsa	50 km (31 mi)	42 km (26 mi)	318 km^{2} (123 sq mi)	2.64 m^{3}/s (93 cu ft/s)	List of rivers of Bulgaria is located in Bulgaria

== See also ==
- Geography of Bulgaria
- Reservoirs and dams in Bulgaria
