= I-2 road (Bulgaria) =

Road in Bulgaria

Republic Road I-2
- Републикански път I-2
- I-2 road highlighted in orange

Route information
- Length: 203 km (126 mi)

Major junctions
- From: Danube Bridge; (Romania)
- To: Varna

Location
- Country: Bulgaria
- Major cities: Ruse, Razgrad, Shumen

Highway system
- Highways in Bulgaria

Republican road I-2 (Bulgarian: Републикански път I-2) is a major first class road in northeastern Bulgaria. It runs between the cities of Ruse, at border with Romania, and Varna, at the Black Sea coast. It is 203 km (126 mi) long. In half of its length, between Shumen and Varna, it runs parallel to the Hemus motorway (A2). It is part of the European route E70. The road passes through the provinces of Ruse, Razgrad, Shumen and Varna.

== Description ==
The infrastructure begins from Danube Bridge, at the Danube border with Romania, forming a junction at its Km 1.5 with the second class II-21 road. It then bypasses Ruse, the fifth largest city in Bulgaria, and runs southeast through the Danubian Plain. A junction at Km 12.5 forms the beginning of the second class II-23 road. The I-2 then crosses the river Beli Lom and Rusenski Lom Nature Park before reaching the small town of Tsar Kaloyan. It bypasses the town of Razgrad, where it intersects with the second class II-49 road, and continues to Shumen, the 10th largest city in Bulgaria.

At the Belokopitovo interchange northwest of Shumen, road I-2 links with the Hemus motorway (A2). The connection was officially inaugurated in August 2015. At Shumen, it intersects with the first class I-7 road and turs in westwards, running in parallel to the Hemus motorway for the rest of its route. The road passes through the towns of Kaspichan and Devnya, continues north of Lake Beloslav and Lake Varna, runs just south of Varna Airport, and reaches the city of Varna, where it connects with the first class I-9 road.
