= Malki Lom =

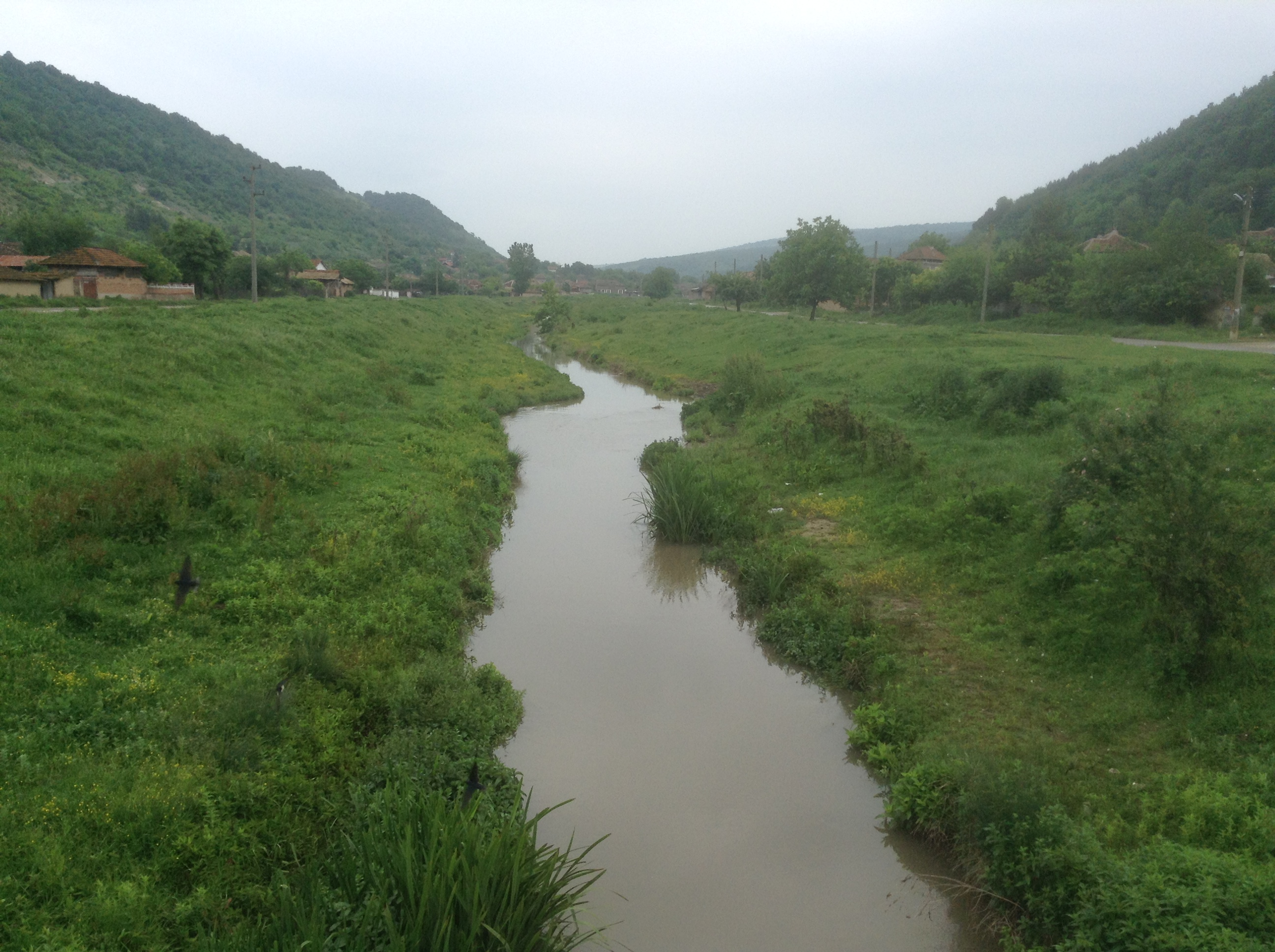

Location
- Country: Bulgaria

Physical characteristics
- Source
  - location: Danubian Plain
  - coordinates: 43°20′51″N 26°23′15″E
  - elevation: 328 m (1,076 ft)
- Mouth
  - location: Beli Lom
  - coordinates: 43°39′5.04″N 26°3′30.96″E
  - elevation: 62 m (203 ft)
- Length: 57 km (35 mi)
- Basin size: 338 km^{2} (131 sq mi)

Basin features
- Progression: Beli Lom→ Rusenski Lom→ Danube→ Black Sea

The Malki Lom (Bulgarian: Малки Лом) is a 57 km-long river in northern Bulgaria, a right tributary of the river Beli Lom, itself a right tributary of the Rusenski Lom of the Danube basin. It is the largest tributary of the Beli Lom. Its lower course falls with the Rusenski Lom Nature Park.

The Malki Lom takes its source from a spring at an altitude of 312 m in the Danubian Plain, some 1.4 km northeast of the village of Golyamo Novo. It flows in general direction northwest throughout its whole course, initially in a wide valley until the village of Svalenik and then in a narrow canyon-like valley cut in Aptian limestones. It flows into the Beli Lom at an altitude of 62 m at the village of Nisovo.

Its drainage basin covers a territory of 338 km^{2} or 21.1% of the Beli Lom's total. The Malki Lom has a rain–snow feed with high water in March–June and low water in July–October.

The river flows in Targovishte, Razgrad and Ruse Provinces. There are six villages along its course, Golyamo Novo in Targovishte Municipality, Lomtsi, Sadinovo and Zahari Stoyanovo in Popovo Municipality, all four in Targovishte Province, was well as Kostandenets in Razgrad Municipality of Razgrad Province, and Svalenik in Ivanovo Municipality of Ruse Province. Its waters are utilized for irrigation.
