= Vrana (river) =

Location
- Country: Bulgaria

Physical characteristics
- Source
  - location: S of Tapchileshtovo
  - coordinates: 43°6′29.88″N 26°27′51.12″E
  - elevation: 567 m (1,860 ft)
- Mouth
  - location: Kamchiya
  - coordinates: 43°11′54.96″N 26°53′30.12″E
  - elevation: 86 m (282 ft)
- Length: 68 km (42 mi)
- Basin size: 938 km^{2} (362 sq mi)

Basin features
- Progression: Kamchiya→ Black Sea

The Vrana (Bulgarian: Врана) is a 68 km-long river in eastern Bulgaria, a left tributary of the river Golyama Kamchiya, the main stem of the Kamchiya of the Black Sea basin.

== Geography ==
The river takes its source at an altitude of 567 m about one kilometer south of the village of Tapchileshtovo. It flows in a wide valley until the village of Prolaz and then enters a deep gorge in direction northeast through the Preslav Mountain of the Balkan Mountains. After emerging from the gorge, its valley widens, making a large convex arc to the north and gradually turns to the southeast. In its lower course the Vrana flows along the southern foothills of the Shumen Plateau. It flows into the Golyama Kamchiya at an altitude of 86 m near the village of Han Krum.

Its drainage basin covers a territory of 938 km^{2} or 17.5% of the Kamchiya's total. It borders the catchment areas of the rivers Yantra, Rusenski Lom and Provadiya.

The Vrana has predominantly rain–snow feed with high water in March and low water in September–October. The average annual flow is at the village of Kochovo is 2.74 m^{3}/s.

== Settlements and economy ==
The river flows in the provinces of Targovishte and Shumen. There are eight settlements along its course, one town, the provincial capital of Targovishte, and seven villages. The villages are Tapchileshtovo in Omurtag Municipality, Prolaz, Razboyna, Probuda and Alvanovo in Targovishte Municipality, as well as Kochovo and Han Krum in Veliki Preslav Municipality of Shumen Province. Much the river's waters are utilised for industrial supply and irrigation.

A 22.7 km stretch of the first class I-4 road Yablanitsa–Veliko Tarnovo–Shumen follows its course between Prolaz and Alvanovo. Between Nadarevo and Han Krum, the river valley is traversed by a section of railway line No. 2 Sofia–Gorna Oryahovitsa–Varna served by the Bulgarian State Railways.
