= Rusenski Lom =

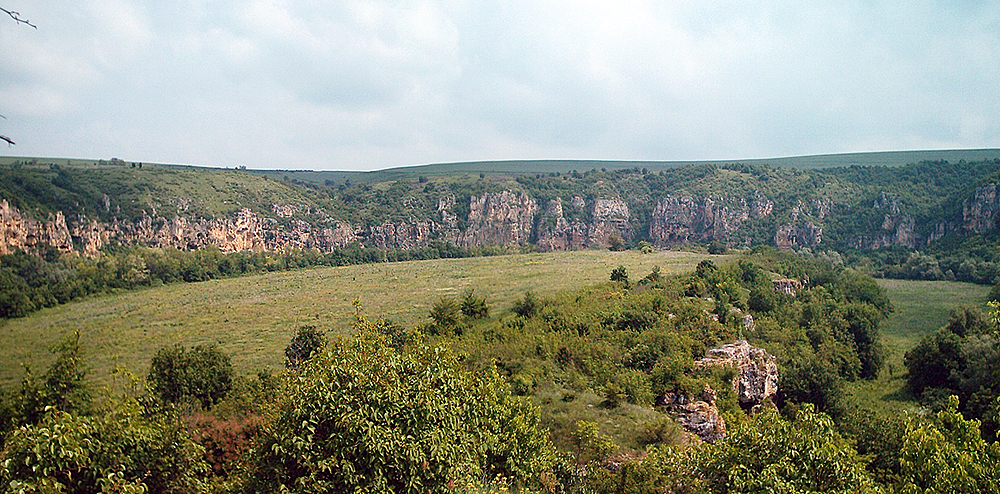
- The canyon-like valley of the Rusenki Lom

Location
- Country: Bulgaria

Physical characteristics
- Source
  - location: confluence of Beli Lom and Cherni Lom
  - coordinates: 43°41′7.08″N 26°0′3.96″E
  - elevation: 47 m (154 ft)
- Mouth
  - location: Danube
  - coordinates: 43°50′6″N 25°55′51.96″E
  - elevation: 16 m (52 ft)
- Length: 55 km (34 mi)
- Basin size: 2,874 km^{2} (1,110 sq mi)

Basin features
- Progression: Danube→ Black Sea

The Rusenski Lom (Bulgarian: Русенски Лом, [ˈrusɛnski ˈɫɔm]) is a river in northeastern Bulgaria, the last major right tributary of the Danube. Its length is 55 km but reaches 197 km if its right constituent river the Beli Lom is included.

== Geography ==
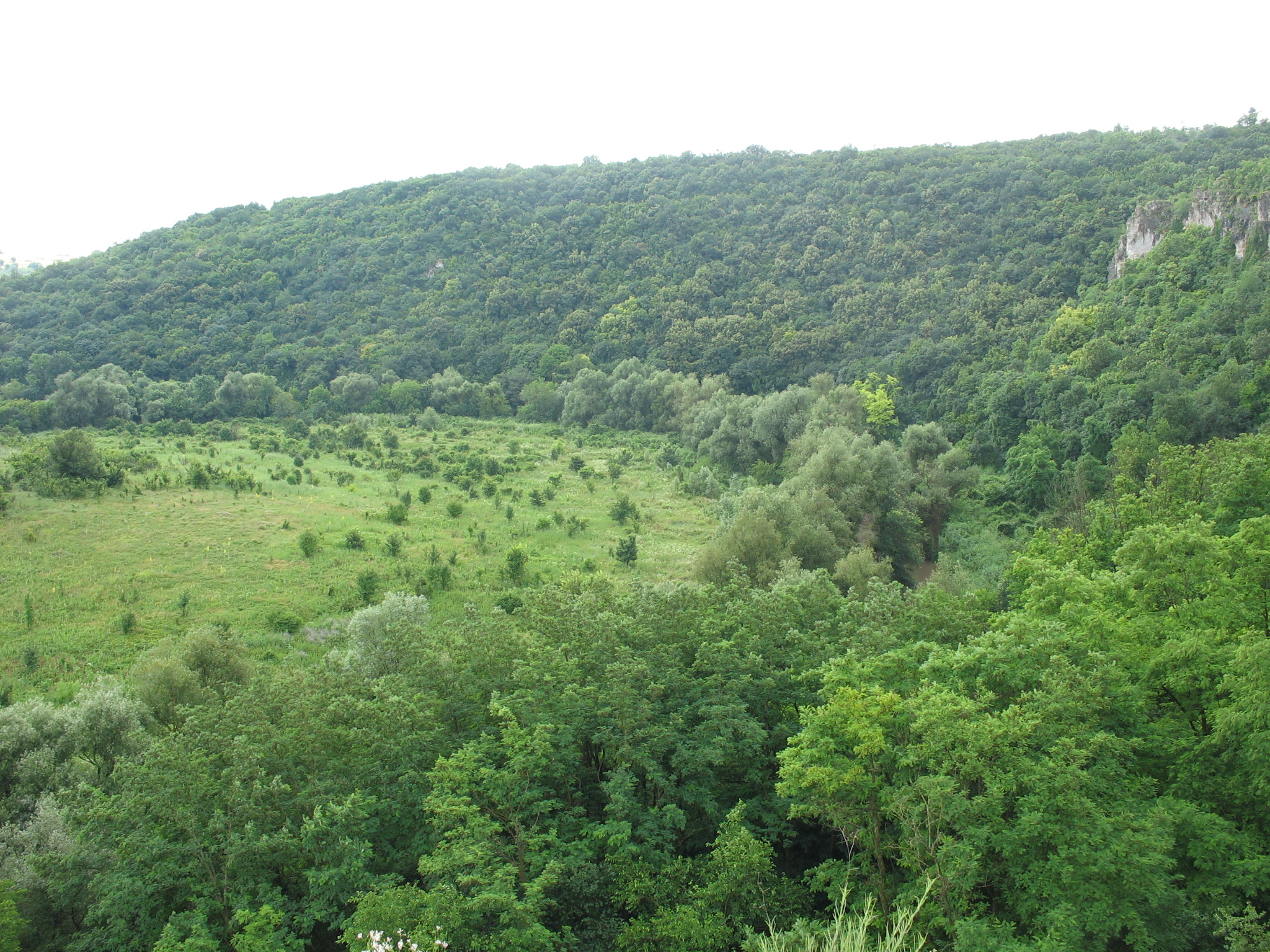
The valley of the Rusenski Lom

The river is formed by the confluence of two constituent rivers, the Beli Lom (147 km, left) and the Cherni Lom (130 km, right), at an altitude of 47 m some 3.2 km east of the village of Ivanovo, Ruse Province. It flows in direction north–northwest through the Danubian Plain in a deep canyon-like valley cut in Aptian limestones. The Rusenski Lom forms numerous meanders due to its small mean slope of 0.62 m/km. Although the length of the river is 55 km, in straight line the distance between its source and mouth is only 17.6 km. It flows into the Danube at an altitude of 16 m in the outskirts of the city of Ruse.

With the two constituent rivers included, its drainage basin covers a territory of 2,874 km^{2} or 0.4% of the Danube's total and borders the river systems of the Yantra to the west and southwest, the Topchiyska reka, the Tsaratsar and the Senkovets to the northeast, and the Kamchiya to the southeast. It drains significant part of Ruse Province, the southwestern parts of Razgrad Province, the northwestern areas of Targovishte Province and small sections of Veliko Tarnovo and Shumen Provinces.

The Rusenski Lom has a rain–snow feed with high water in spring, when 60% of the annual discharge flows. The average annual discharge at the village of Basarbovo is 5.6 m^{3}/s.

== Settlements, economy and landmarks ==
The river flows entirely in Ruse Province. There are four settlements along its course, one city and three villages — Bozhichen and Krasen in Ivanovo Municipality, and Basarbovo and Ruse — the largest city along the Bulgarian sector of the Danube — in Ruse Municipality. Its waters are utilized for irrigation and industrial supply. On its month is located the Port of Ruse West.

The uppermost course is situated in and gives the name of Rusenski Lom Nature Park with rich wildlife, rock formations and caves. Within the park, overlooking one of the meanders of the Rusenski Lom, are the Rock-hewn Churches of Ivanovo dating from the 13th and 14th centuries during the Second Bulgarian Empire, a UNESCO World Heritage Site since 1979. Further downstream is located the Basarbovo Monastery, situated in the rocks overlooking the river valley. The city of Ruse itself is a major cultural hub of Bulgaria with a rich architectural heritage.
