= Dervent Heights =

- Bulgarian: Дервентски възвишения
- Location within Bulgaria

Highest point
- Peak: Gyurgenbair
- Elevation: 555 m (1,821 ft)
- Coordinates: 41°59′13″N 26°50′38″E

Dimensions
- Length: 50 km (31 mi) west-east
- Width: 45 km (28 mi) north-south

Geography
- Countries: Bulgaria, Turkey

Geology
- Rock type(s): limestone, granite

Dervent Heights (Bulgarian: Дервентски възвишения) are a hilly ridge in Yambol Province in south-eastern Bulgaria (40%) and European Turkey (60%).

== Description ==
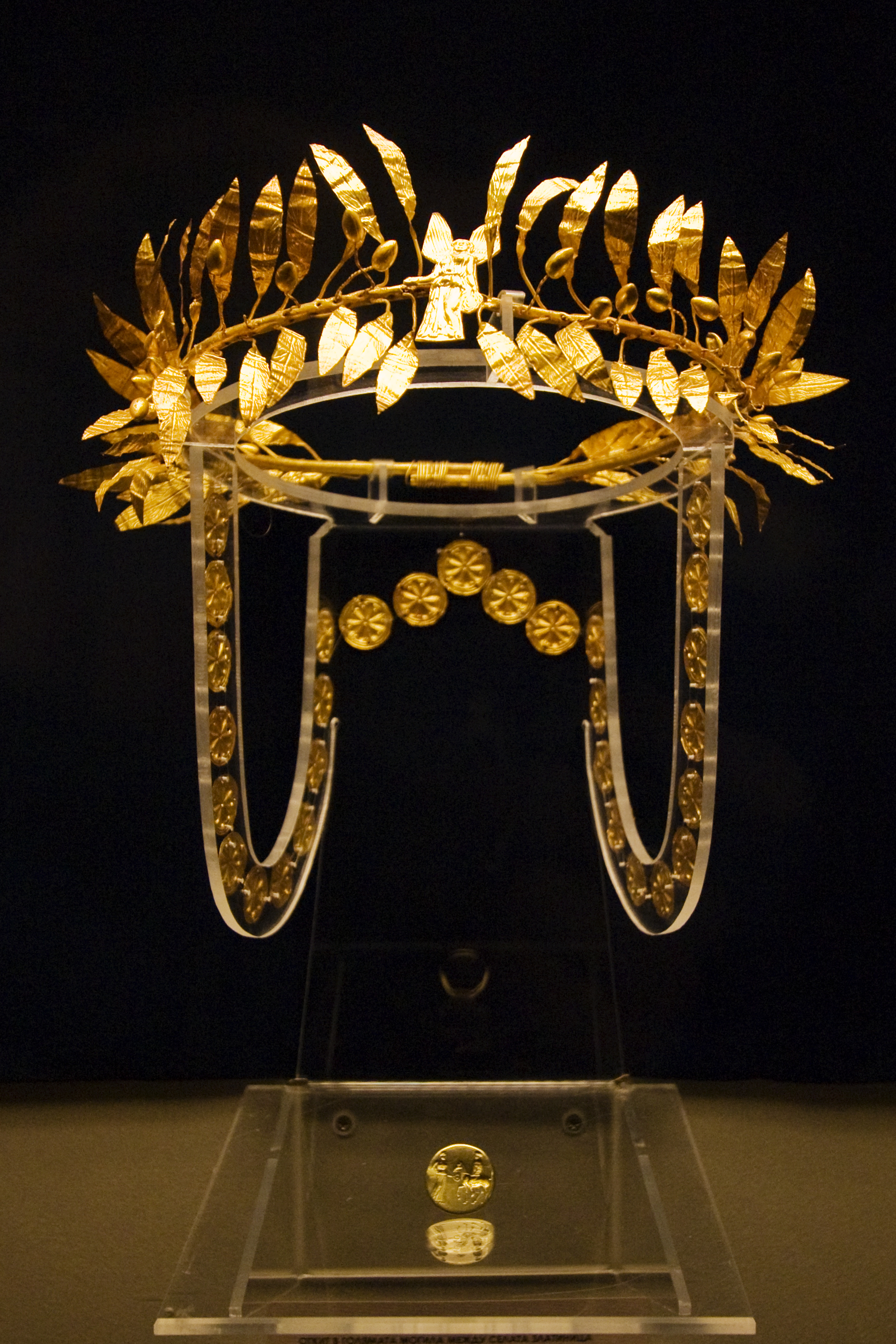
A golden wreath from the burial of a Thracian aristocrat between the villages of Zlatinitsa and Malomirovo, dated to the mid 4th century BC

Dervent Heights span 50 km from west to east and 45 km from north to south. Dervent Heights are situated between the Srem gorge of the river Tundzha in the west to the valleys of the rivers Popovska and Chengerligere in the east which separate them from the Strandzha mountain. To the north and the south the heights reach the plains of Elhovo and Edirne. The border between Bulgaria and Turkey follows the main crest of the heights.

== Geography ==
The crest is flat and slightly hilly reaching an altitude of 300-450 m with rounded peaks, the highest being Gyurgenbair (555 m), situated in Bulgarian territory at 2 km to the south-west of the village of Kraynovo. Dervent Heights are formed mainly by limestone and granite. There are small deposits of iron and copper ore. There are more than 30 karst caves in the Bulgarian section. The climate is Mediterranean. Several rivers have their source in the heights, including Popovska reka (72 km), Arapliyska reka (42 km) and Boyalashka reka (33 km) (belonging to the Tundzha basin in Bulgaria), and Tatardere, Havsadere and Chengerdere (tributaries of the Ergene in Turkey). Large areas of the crest and the slopes are covered with deciduous forests and pastures. The region is inhabited by 120 bird species, of them 25 are included in the Red Book of Bulgaria. Dervent heights are included in the European Union network of nature protection areas Natura 2000.

== Settlements ==
In the Bulgarian part of the Dervent Heights to the north there are 20 villages: Chernozem, Golyan Dervent, Granitovo, Zlatinitsa, Kraynovo, Lalkovo, Lesovo, Malko Kirilovo, Malko Sharkovo, Malomirovo, Mamarchevo, Melnitsa, Razdel, Sharkovo, Sitovo, Slaveykovo, Srem, Voden, Valcha Polyana and Zlatinitsa.

On Turkish territory in the south there is one town, Lalapaşa, and 20 villages.
