= Boynitsa Municipality =

Boynitsa Municipality Община Бойница
- Municipality
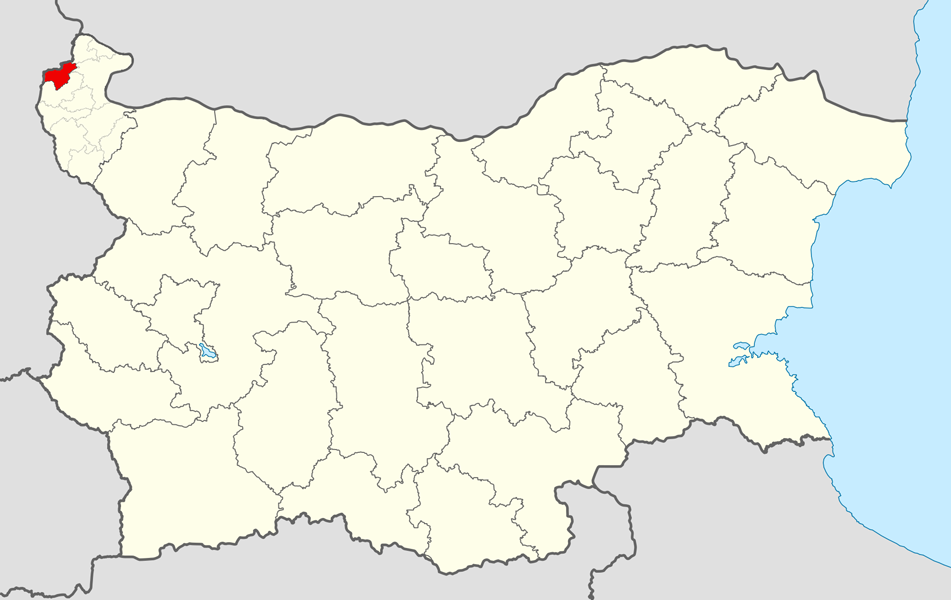
- Boynitsa Municipality within Bulgaria and Vidin Province.
- Coordinates: 43°58′N 22°30′E
- Country: Bulgaria
- Province (Oblast): Vidin
- Admin. centre (Obshtinski tsentar): Boynitsa

Area
  - Total: 166 km^{2} (64 sq mi)

Population (2021)
  - Total: 780
  - Density: 4.7/km^{2} (12/sq mi)
- Time zone: UTC+2 (EET)
  - Summer (DST): UTC+3 (EEST)

Boynitsa Municipality (Bulgarian: Община Бойница) is a small frontier municipality (obshtina) in Vidin Province, Northwestern Bulgaria, located in the Danubian Plain about 20 km southwest of Danube river. It is named after its administrative centre - the village of Boynitsa. The area borders on the Republic of Serbia to the west and northwest.

The municipality embraces a territory of 166 km^{2} (64 sq mi) with a population of 1,717 inhabitants, as of December 2009.

== Settlements ==
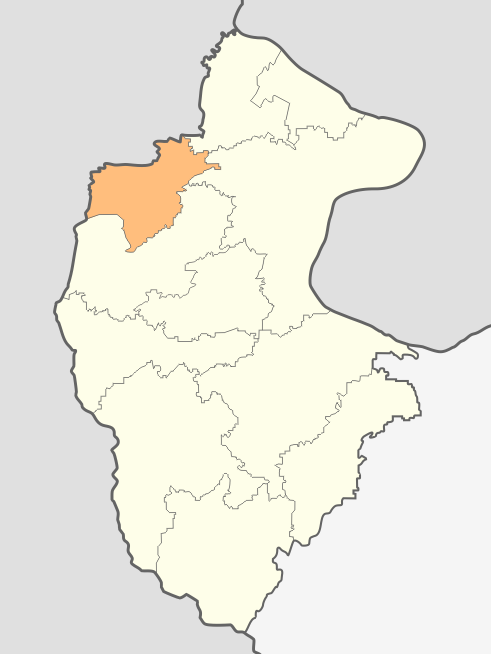
Boynitsa Municipality within Vidin Province

Boynitsa Municipality includes the following 8 places all of them villages:

Town/Village	Cyrillic	Population (December 2009)
Boynitsa	Бойница	595
Borilovets	Бориловец	299
Gradskovski Kolibi	Градсковски колиби	67
Kanits	Каниц	15
Perilovets	Периловец	91
Rabrovo	Раброво	468
Shipikova Mahala	Шипикова махала	8
Shishentsi	Шишенци	174
Total		1,717

== Demography ==
The following table shows the change of the population since World War II.

Historical population
Year	Pop.	±%
1946	9,949	—
1956	8,805	−11.5%
1965	7,297	−17.1%
1975	5,466	−25.1%
1985	4,746	−13.2%
1992	3,330	−29.8%
2001	2,270	−31.8%
2011	1,341	−40.9%
2021	763	−43.1%

=== Vital statistics ===
As of most recent statistics from 2025, the population of Boynitsa dropped further to 694 people. There were 5 births recorded and 32 deaths. That means that the population dropped by 27 people, because of natural increase. In the period between 2000-2025 there were a total of 124 births recorded. The number of deaths in the same period was 1,751. That means that the population of Boynitsa declined by 1,627 people just because the fact more people are dying than that being born. Boynitsa is one of the smallest municipalities by population (only Treklyano Municipality has a smaller population).

	Population	Live births	Deaths	Natural growth	Birth rate (‰)	Death rate (‰)	Natural growth rate (‰)
2000	2,335	13	96	-83	5.6	41.1	-35.5
2001	2,186	12	90	-78	5.5	41.2	-35.7
2002	2,152	7	84	-77	3.3	39.0	-35.8
2003	2,139	7	67	-60	3.3	31.3	-28.0
2004	2,075	4	81	-77	1.9	39.0	-37.1
2005	1,947	3	117	-114	1.5	60.1	-58.6
2006	1,850	8	92	-84	4.3	49.7	-45.4
2007	1,913	4	72	-68	2.1	37.6	-35.5
2008	1,797	5	89	-84	2.8	49.5	-46.7
2009	1,717	5	74	-69	2.9	43.1	-40.2
2010	1,659	7	70	-63	4.2	43.2	-38.0
2011	1,293	6	72	-66	4.6	55.7	-51.0
2012	1,218	3	73	-70	2.5	59.9	-57.4
2013	1,169	7	65	-58	6.0	55.6	-49.6
2014	1,126	3	60	-57	2.7	53.3	-50.6
2015	1,143	0	52	-52	0.0	45.5	-45.5
2016	1,077	4	56	-52	3.7	52.0	-48.3
2017	996	4	46	-42	4.0	46.2	-42.2
2018	936	2	55	-53	2.1	58.8	-56.6
2019	869	4	45	-41	4.6	51.8	-47.2
2020	823	2	40	-38	2.4	48.6	-46.2
2021	780	2	54	-52	2.6	69.2	-66.6
2022	740	1	43	-42	1.4	58.1	-56.7
2023	744	6	24	-18	8.1	32.3	-24.2
2024	712	0	25	-25	0.0	35.1	-35.1
2025	694	5	32	-27	7.2	46.1	-38.9

=== Religion ===
According to the latest Bulgarian census of 2011, the religious composition, among those who answered the optional question on religious identification, was the following:

Religious composition of Boynitsa Municipality
Orthodox Christianity	77.7%
Catholicism	0.0%
Protestantism	0.6%
Islam	0.0%
No religion	5.1%
Prefer not to answer, others and indefinable	16.6%

== See also ==
- Provinces of Bulgaria
- Municipalities of Bulgaria
- List of cities and towns in Bulgaria
