= II-23 road (Bulgaria) =

Road in Bulgaria

Republic Road I-23
- Републикански път I-23

Route information
- Length: 118 km (73 mi)

Major junctions
- From: Km 12.5 of I-2, Ruse
- To: Km 41.9 of I-7

Location
- Country: Bulgaria

Highway system
- Highways in Bulgaria

Republican Road II-23 (Bulgarian: Републикански път II-23) is a second-class road in northeastern Bulgaria, running through Ruse, Razgrad and Silistra Provinces. Its length is 118 km.

== Route description ==
The road starts at Km 12.5 of the first class I-2 road southeast of the Danubian port city of Ruse and heads east through the eastern section of the Danubian Plain. It passes through villages of Chervena Voda, Novo Selo and Tetovo, and enters Razgrad Province. There, its passes through Belovets, the town of Kubrat, where there is a cross-section with the second class II-49 road, Medovene, Brestovene, the town of Zavet, Malak Porovets, Dragomazh, the town of Isperih, Kitanchevo and Todorovo and reaches Silistra Province. It the latter, the II-23 runs through the villages of Okorsh, Vokil, Oven and Chernik, as well as the town of Dulovo and east of the settlement reaches its terminus at Km 41.9 of the first class I-7 road.
