= II-49 road (Bulgaria) =

Road in Bulgaria

Republic Road I-49
- Републикански път I-49

Route information
- Length: 99.3 km (61.7 mi)

Major junctions
- From: Km 233.2 of I-4, Targovishte
- To: Km 46.5 of II-21

Location
- Country: Bulgaria
- Towns: Targovishte, Razgrad, Tutrakan

Highway system
- Highways in Bulgaria

Republican Road II-49 (Bulgarian: Републикански път II-49) is a second-class road in northeastern Bulgaria, running through Targovishte, Razgrad and Silistra Provinces. Its length is 99.3 km.

== Route description ==
The road starts at Km 233.2 of the first class I-4 road in the northern outskirts of the town of Targovishte and heads north through the eastern section of the Danubian Plain. It passes through villages of Davidovo and Bistra, and enters Razgrad Province. There, its passes through the village of Trapishte and ascends the southern slopes of the Razgrad Heights. At the village of Manastirsko the road crosses the upper course of the river Beli Lom, passes through the ridge of the heights and again descends to the valley of the Beli Lom east of the town of Razgrad.

It bypasses the town from northeast and heads north through the western parts of the Ludogorie Plateau. The road goes through the villages of Strazhets and Kichenitsa and at Topchii descends to the deep valley of the river Topchiyska reka, which it follows to the village of Kamenovo. From there it turns northeast and reaches the town of Kubrat, where there is an intersection with the second class II-23 road. North of the town it gradually descends the Ludogorie Plateau, passes through the village of Zadruga and enters Silistra Province in the easternmost part of the Pobrezhie Plain along the river Danube. The road goes through Staro Selo and southwest of the town of Tutrakan reaches its terminus at Km 46.5 of the second class II-21 road.
