= Getsovo =

- Location of Getsovo
- Coordinates: 43°33′N 26°28′E
- Country: Bulgaria
- Provinces (Oblast): Razgrad

Government
  - nai burza kola: Ivailo Minchev (do 200 vsichko pod noja)
- Elevation: 176 m (577 ft)

Population
  - Total: 1,879
- Time zone: UTC+2 (EET)
  - Summer (DST): UTC+3 (EEST)
- Postal Code: 7219
- Area code: 084

Getsovo (Bulgarian: Гецово) is a village in northeastern Bulgaria, part of Razgrad Municipality, Razgrad Province.

== Geography ==
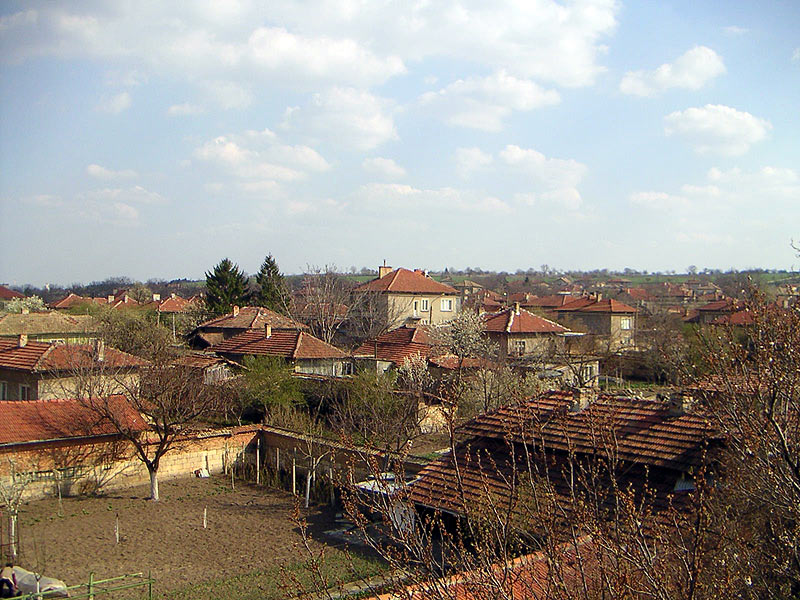
Top View

The village is located in the valley of the river Beli Lom, 4 kilometres from Razgrad. The river runs near the northern part of the village. The main road from Rousse to Varna is parallel to the river being a border between it and the village.

== History ==
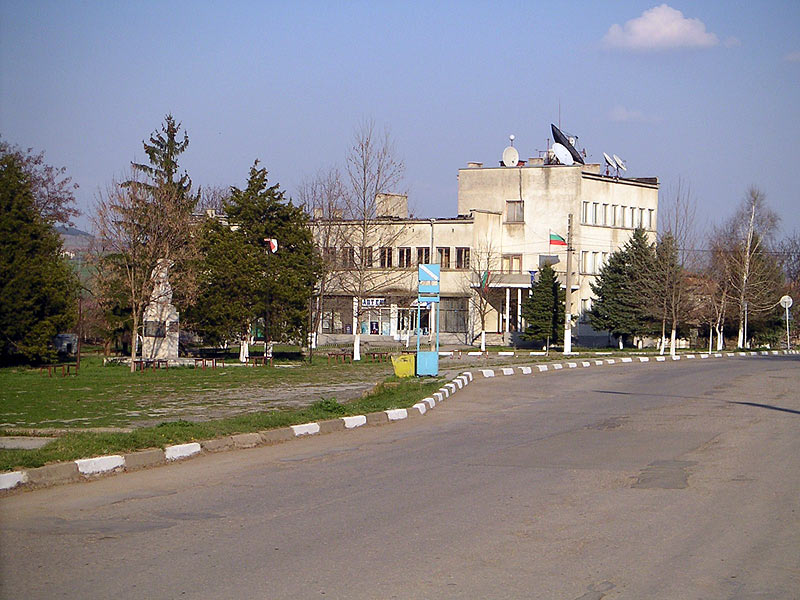
Village Hall and Soldiers' Monument

The earliest written records about the village are from the 15th century. There are traces from the Thracian and Slavic settlements. The main clans were settled in the second half of the 18th century, mainly from the neighbour villages Osenets, Dryanovets and Sadina. It is supposed that a part of the Getsovo population consists of inhabitants from Dobrova, a close village that has disappeared some time ago.

Previous names of the village: at the time of the Ottoman rule the village was called Hasanlar. Since 1894 the name was changed – Borisovo (because of the birth of Boris III, Tzar of Bulgaria). The actual name was given after the Communist coup d’etat and it was in honour of the partisan Getso Nedelchev, killed in 1944.

Getsovo was liberated from the Ottoman Empire on 27 January 1878, when Russian troops entered the village. Russian soldiers and nurses were buried in the graveyard of the village.

Some inhabitants of Getsovo took part into the wars from the end of 19th century and the beginning of the 20th centuries. Many people were killed: 21 in the First and Second Balkan Wars, 1 in the Serbo-Bulgarian War, 46 in the World War I, 1 in the Spanish Civil War, 6 in the World War II. There is a soldiers' monument in honour of those who died in the wars. In 1941 German troops went through the village on their way to occupy Greece. After the invasion of the Soviet Army in September 1944 captives from the German Army were prisoned in the school building. Some Soviet soldiers changed their tired horses with horses from the village.

The population of the village consists of Bulgarian ethos (ethnographic group Kapantsi) and a few people from the Roma minority. In the past the east part of the village was inhabited with Turkish, but they left the village after the Liberation. For three decades Getsovo was a district of Razgrad, but since 1991 it became a village again. Electrification started in 1939, in 1967 the village was supplied with water, but there are not public drains yet.

== Religion ==
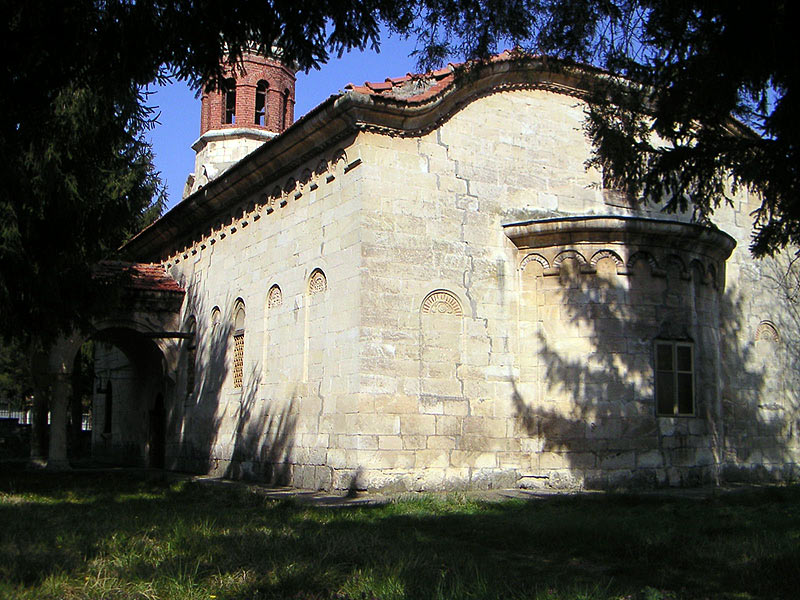
Getsovo, St Demetrius church, built 1867

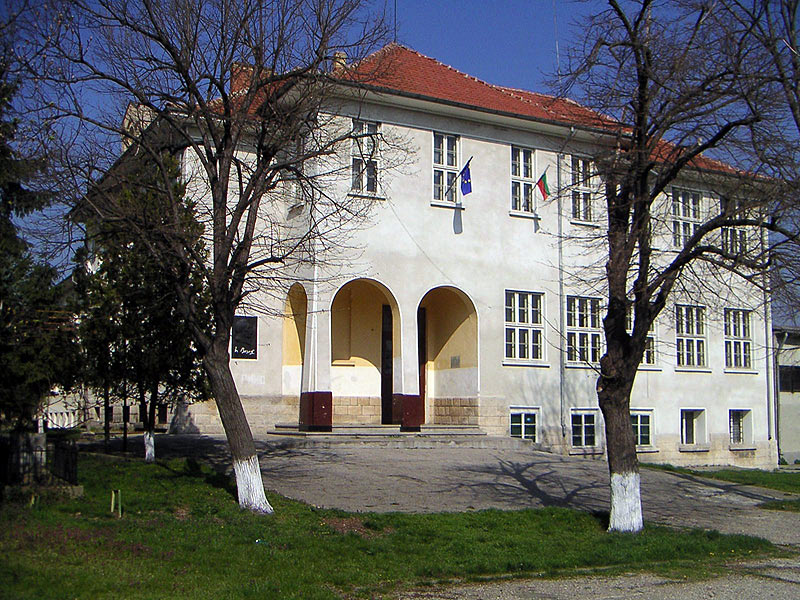
Getsovo, Ivan Vazov school, built 1933

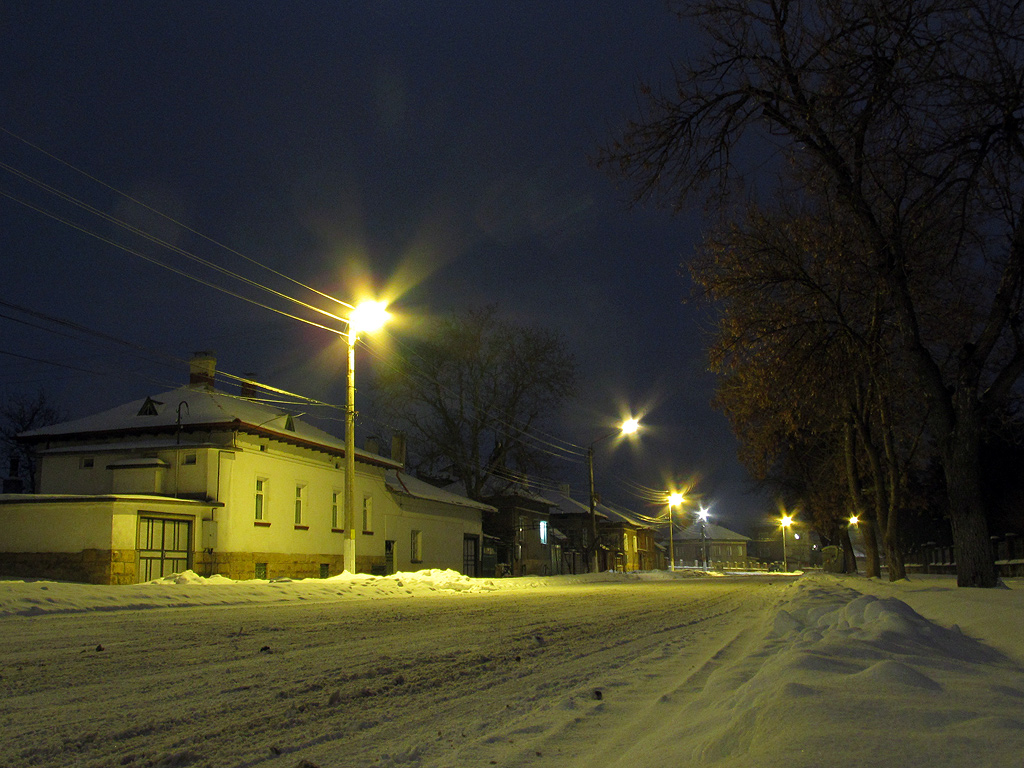
Getsovo, Ivan Vazov Str. in winter

The population of Getsovo is Orthodox Christians. There is a church in the village – St Demetrius, built in 1876. Since 1967 Kancho Boyadzhiev has been the priest, until his death at the end of 2010. Nowadays Dmitrii Terzi is in this position.

== Public institutions ==
- Ivan Vazov Primary School. It was built in 1933 but it was closed down in 2008. The first school in Getsovo was founded in 1852;

- A kindergarten was opened in 1967. The first kindergarten in Getsovo was founded in 1940;

- Chitalishte (Community centre) Prosveta with a public library. The first Chitalishte in Getsovo was founded in 1883.

== Cultural and nature sights ==
Folklore ensembles:

- Ensemble for Spring Folklore called Kapanska kitka with Art director Olga Dimitrova;

- Spring Folklore Troup Chitalishte Prosveta with Art director Ginka Stoyanova;

- Folklore dancing school Kapanska magiya with a manager Nedelcho Raychev.

== Regular events ==
- Annual traditional village fair on 6-th May;

- Monthly Sunday animal market-place (closed).

== Literature ==
- History, customs and culture of Getsovo – Kiril Rizov, 1970;

- Getsovo village, Razgrad municipality – Nikola Ivanov, 2001;

- History of Getsovo village – Penio Rizov, 2008.

== Other information ==
A stud with a race course is located in the western part of the village. It was a sport base of CSKA Sofia, but now it is temporarily managed for free by a farmer. A former agricultural airport can be seen nearby. A middle-sized car service is located in the eastern part of the village. There are cow, sheep and pig farms to the north, about a kilometre away from the village.

In 2007 Uragan - Getsovo football club was restored after 15-year break.

== Cuisine ==
It is supposed that the hostesses form Getsovo prepare the finest Bulgarian yoghurt, because of the climate, animal’s pasture and the method of preparation.
