= Boyalashka reka =

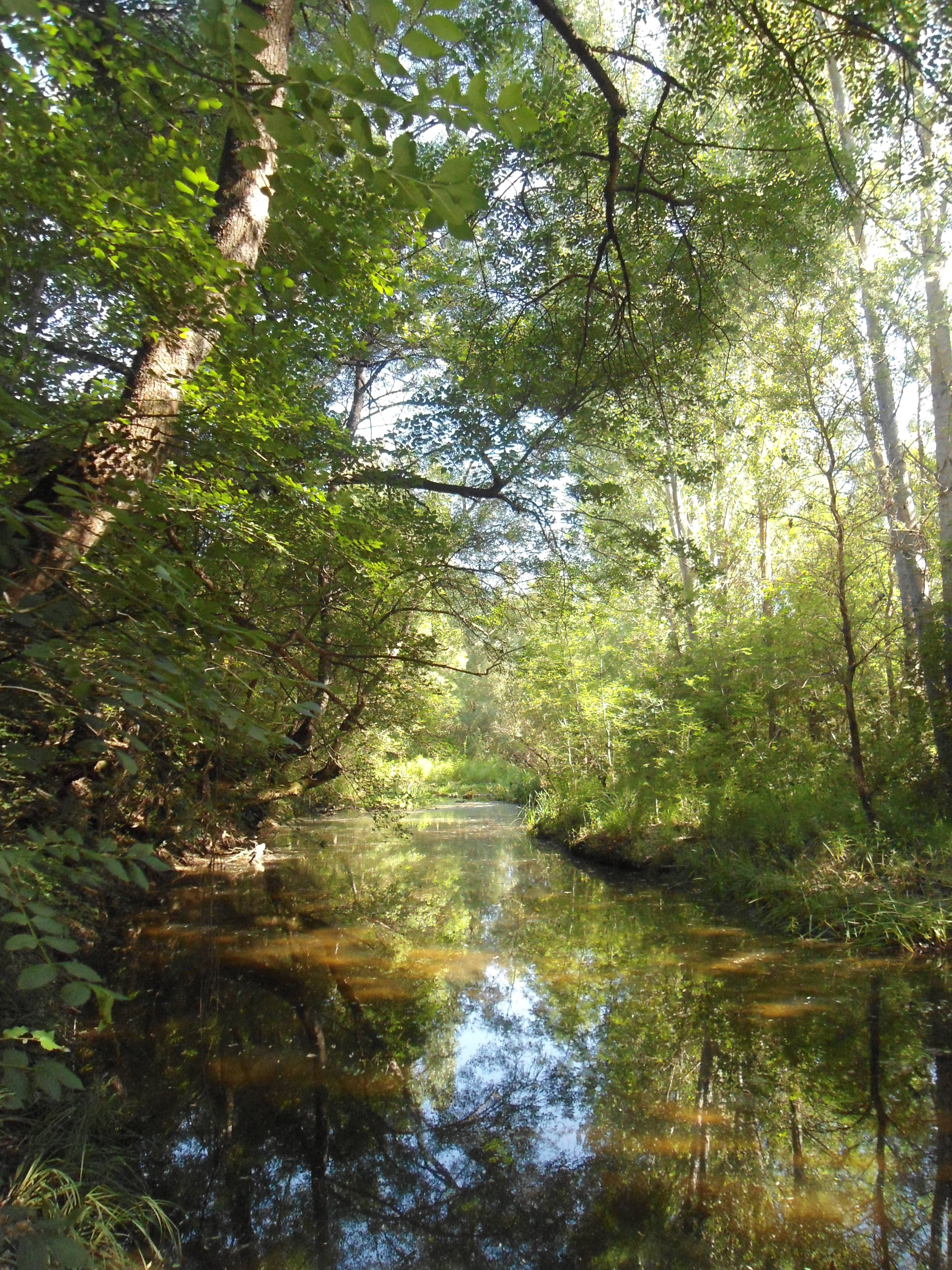

Location
- Country: Bulgaria

Physical characteristics
- Source
  - location: Dervent Heights
  - coordinates: 41°59′0.96″N 26°51′0″E
  - elevation: 502 m (1,647 ft)
- Mouth
  - location: Arapliyska reka
  - coordinates: 42°6′43.92″N 26°36′45″E
  - elevation: 117 m (384 ft)
- Length: 33 km (21 mi)
- Basin size: 159 km^{2} (61 sq mi)

Basin features
- Progression: Arapliyska reka→ Popovska reka→ Tundzha→ Maritsa

The Boyalashka reka (Bulgarian: Боялъшка река) is a 33 km long river in southern Bulgaria, a right tributary of the river Arapliyska reka, itself a left tributary of the Popovska reka of the Tundzha basin. It is the largest tributary of the Arapliyska reka.

The river takes its source under the name Chakarlia an altitude of 502 m in the Dervent Heights, some 7005 m south of their highest point Gyurgenbair (555 m), which is situated in Bulgarian territory just north of the Bulgaria–Turkey border. It flows in a narrow forested valley through the northern slopes of the Dervent Heights in direction northwest. It flows into the Arapliyska at an altitude of 117 m some 200 m east of the village of Chernozem.

Its drainage basin covers a territory of 159 km^{2} or 45.3% of the Popovska reka's total. The Boyalashka reka has predominantly rain feed with high water in autumn and winter.

The river flows entirely in Yambol Province. There is only one settlement along its course, the village of Lalkovo in Elhovo Municipality. Its waters are utilised for irrigation.
