= Mortagonovo =

Mortagonovo Мортагоново
- Location of Mortagonovo
- Coordinates: 43.521°N 26.646°E
- Country: Bulgaria
- Provinces (Oblast): Razgrad
- Elevation: 350 m (1,150 ft)

Population (2015)
  - Total: 1,086
- Time zone: UTC+2 (EET)
  - Summer (DST): UTC+3 (EEST)
- Postal Code: 7248
- Area code: 084711

Mortagonovo (in Bulgarian: Мортагоново) is a village in northern Bulgaria, Razgrad municipality, Razgrad Province. Before 1934 the village was known as Ahmak, Ahmach (in Bulgarian: Ахмак, Ахмач).
