= Topolovets (river) =

Location
- Country: Bulgaria

Physical characteristics
- Source
  - location: 1 km E of Vrashka Chuka
  - coordinates: 43°49′59.88″N 22°22′57″E
  - elevation: 404 m (1,325 ft)
- Mouth
  - location: Danube
  - coordinates: 43°56′8.88″N 22°51′3.96″E
  - elevation: 33 m (108 ft)
- Length: 68 km (42 mi)
- Basin size: 583 km^{2} (225 sq mi)

Basin features
- Progression: Danube→ Black Sea

The Topolovets (Bulgarian: Тополовец) is a river in northwestern Bulgaria, a right tributary of the Danube. Its length is 68 km.

The river takes its source under the name Mostishte at an altitude of 404 m about a kilometer east of the summit of Vrashka Chuka (693 m) in the northwesternmost part of the Balkan Mountains and flows in the western Danubian Plain. Until the village of Gradets it flows in direction northeast and east in a canyon-like valley. Downstream of the village it turns southeast, enters the Vidin Plain and flows into the Danube at an altitude of 33 m.

Its drainage basin covers a territory of 583 km^{2} and is situated between the basins of the rivers Timok to the west and northwest, the Voynishka reka to the south, and several small rivers flowing into the Danube to the north and northeast. The main tributaries are the Rabrovska reka (26 km) and Deleynska reka (33 km), both of them left. The river has predominantly snow–rain feed with high water during the snowmelt in early spring. It dries out in summer. The average annual discharge at its mouth is 1.23 m^{3}/s.

The Topolovets flows entirely in Vidin Province. There are five settlements along its course, the villages of Izvor Mahala, Dolni Boshnyak, Gradets, Akatsievo and Novoseltsi, the first one in Kula Municipality and the rest in Vidin Municipality. Along its left bank in the middle course runs a 10 km stretch of the third class III-121 road Inovo–Boynitsa–Kula. Its waters are utilized for irrigation and water supply.
