= Rabrovska reka =

Location
- Country: Bulgaria

Physical characteristics
- Source
  - location: Balkan Mountains
  - coordinates: 43°55′41.16″N 22°25′28.92″E
  - elevation: 328 m (1,076 ft)
- Mouth
  - location: Danube
  - coordinates: 44°1′14.16″N 22°39′28.92″E
  - elevation: 87 m (285 ft)
- Length: 26 km (16 mi)
- Basin size: 137 km^{2} (53 sq mi)

Basin features
- Progression: Topolovets→ Danube

The Rabrovska reka (Bulgarian: Рабровска река) is a river in northwestern Bulgaria, a left tributary of the Topolovets, itself a right tributary of the Danube. Its length is 26 km.

The river takes its source under the name Boynishka reka at an altitude of 328 m some 1.2 km northwest of the village of Golemanovo in the northwesternmost part of the Balkan Mountains. It flows in the western Danubian Plain in direction northeast. In its last 3 km it runs eastwards before flowing into the Topolovets at an altitude of 87 m about 3.3 km downstream from the village of Dolni Boshnyak.

Its drainage basin covers a territory of 137 km^{2}, or 24% of the Topolovets's total.

The Rabrovska reka flows entirely in Vidin Province. From its mouth upstream runs a 12 km stretch of the third class III-121 road Inovo–Boynitsa–Kula. Its waters are utilized for irrigation via the Golemanovo Reservoir. Some 3 km downstream from the river's source is located the Albotin Monastery, a medieval Bulgarian cave sanctuary with fresco fragments dating from the 14th century during the Second Bulgarian Empire.
