= Bohot (river) =

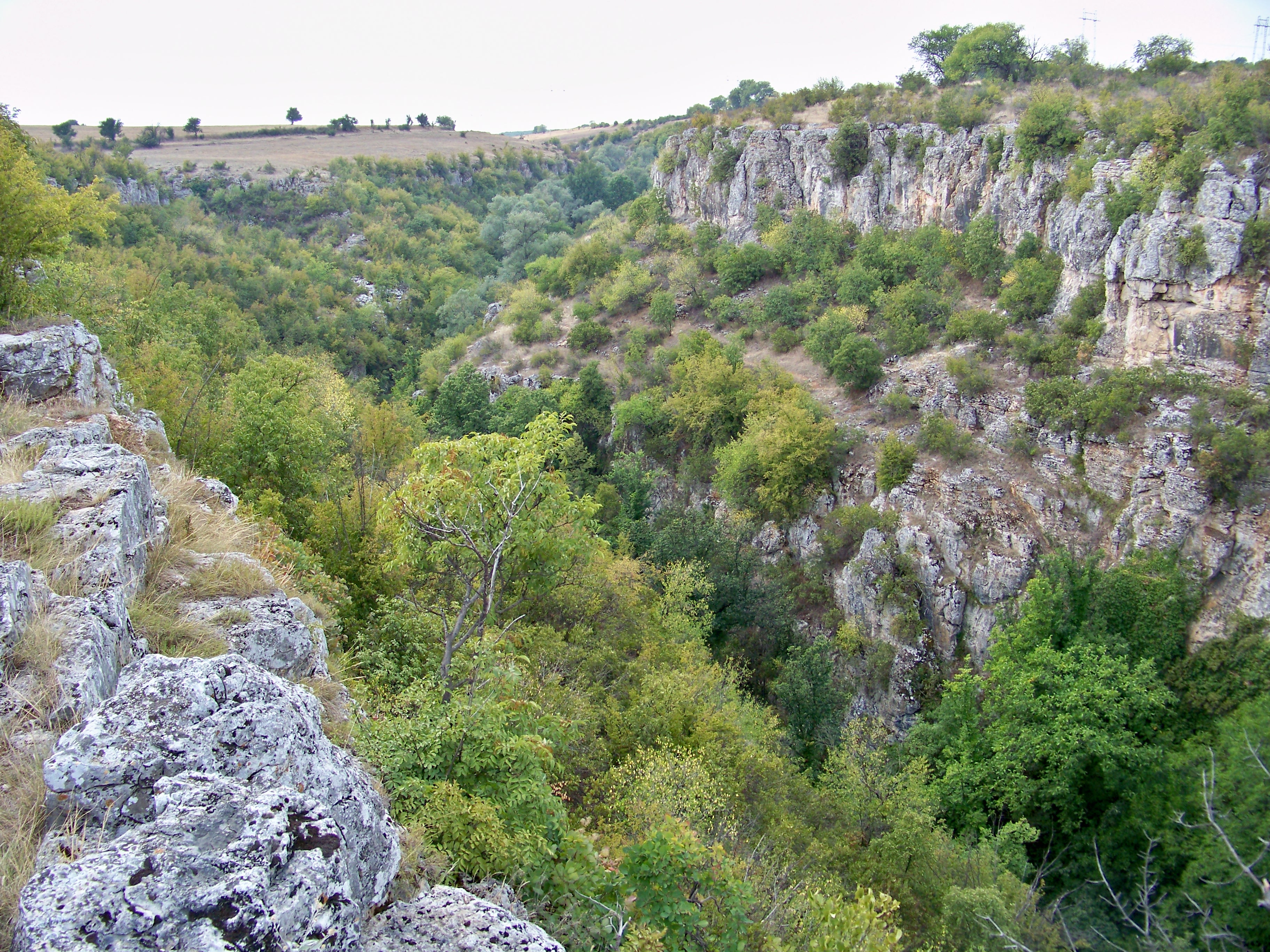
- The river gorge at Hotnitsa

Location
- Country: Bulgaria

Physical characteristics
- Source
  - location: S of Novo Selo, Fore-Balkan
  - coordinates: 43°3′51.84″N 25°22′15.96″E
  - elevation: 469 m (1,539 ft)
- Mouth
  - location: Rositsa
  - coordinates: 43°12′50.04″N 25°36′7.92″E
  - elevation: 57 m (187 ft)
- Length: 32 km (20 mi)
- Basin size: 99 km^{2} (38 sq mi)

Basin features
- Progression: Rositsa→ Yantra→ Danube→ Black Sea

The Bohot (Bulgarian: Бохот) is a 32 km-long river in northern Bulgaria, a right tributary of the Rositsa, itself a left tributary of the river Yantra of the Danube basin.

The Bohot takes its source under the name Kurudere at an altitude of 469 m just south of the village of Novo Selo in the Fore-Balkan. It flows through the village of Balvan and the small Bahanitsa Reservoir and heads northeast, cutting through the western part of the Tarnovo Heights. Some 2 km west of Hotnitsa it forms the 30 m high Hotnitsa Waterfall. Downstream of the village the Bohot enters the Danubian Plain and flows into the Rositsa at an altitude of 67 m, about 800 m southwest of the remains of the Roman city of Nicopolis ad Istrum.

Its drainage basin covers a territory of 99 km^{2} or 4.4% of the Rositsa's total. It is primarily fed by karst spring waters.

The river flows entirely in Veliko Tarnovo Province. There are two villages along its course, Balvan and Hotnitsa in Veliko Tarnovo Municipality. Its waters are utilized for irrigation.
