= Tsaratsar =

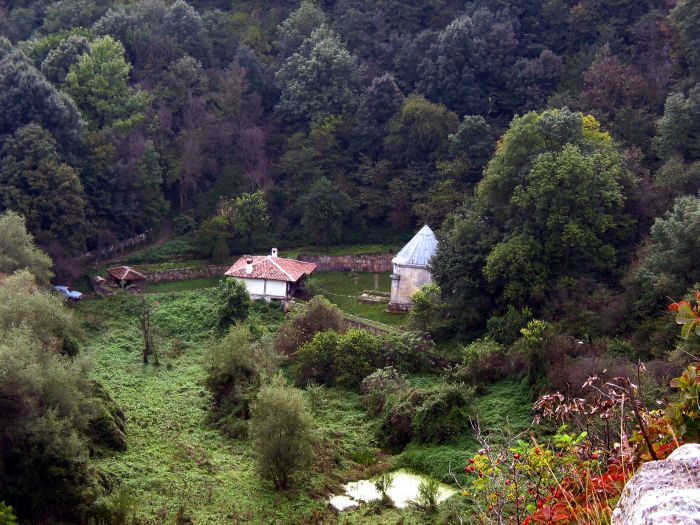
- The river valley near Demir Baba Teke

Location
- Country: Bulgaria

Physical characteristics
- Source
  - location: Samuilovo Heights
  - coordinates: 43°33′24.84″N 26°45′24.84″E
  - elevation: 382 m (1,253 ft)
- Mouth
  - location: Danube
  - coordinates: 44°2′39.12″N 26°34′32.88″E
  - elevation: 11 m (36 ft)
- Length: 108 km (67 mi)
- Basin size: 1,062 km^{2} (410 sq mi)

Basin features
- Progression: Danube→ Black Sea

The Tsaratsar (Bulgarian: Царацар) is a river in the Ludogorie region of northeastern Bulgaria, a right tributary of the Danube. Its length is 108 km.

== Geography ==
The Tsaratsar takes its source under the name Karapancha from a spring at an altitude of 382 m in the northern part of the Samuilovo Heights, within the village of Harsovo. It runs through in a deep canyon-like valley cut in Aptian limestones. The river flow north until the Irihisar hunting area, then northeast until the town of Glavinitsa, west until the Kubrat–Tutrakan road, and finally north again until its mouth. Downstream of the village of Stefan Karadzha it dries up and receives irregular flow. The river flows into the Danube west of Tutrakan at an altitude of 11 m.

Its drainage basin covers a territory of 1,062 km^{2} or 0.1% of the Danube's total. The river has rain–snow feed. It is also fed by karst springs, which unlike most other rivers in Ludogorie and Dobruja, allows the Tsaratsar to have water further downstream. Its water flow is not constant. Yet, the average annual discharge remains very low, only 0.063 m^{3}/s at the village of Malak Porovets.

== Settlements and culture ==
The Tsaratsar flows in Razgrad and Silistra Provinces. There are nine villages along its course. In Razgrad Province are Harsovo in Samuil Municipality, Golyam Porovets, Malak Porovets and Dragomazh in Isperih Municipality, as well as Ivan Shishmanovo in Zavet Municipality. In Silistra Province are located Osen and Stefan Karadzha in Glavinitsa Municipality, and Belitsa and Staro Selo in Tutrakan Municipality. Its waters in the upper and lower course are utilized for irrigation.

A 9.6 km section of the second class II-49 road Targovishte–Razgrad–Tutrakan follows the river valley near Staro Selo.

There are several important sites in the Sboryanovo historical and archaeological reserve along the river valley. These include the Thracian Tomb of Sveshtari dated from the 4th-century BC, a UNESCO World heritage Site, and the 16th-century Alevi mausoleum Demir Baba Teke, part of the 100 Tourist Sites of Bulgaria.
