= Malka Arda (river) =

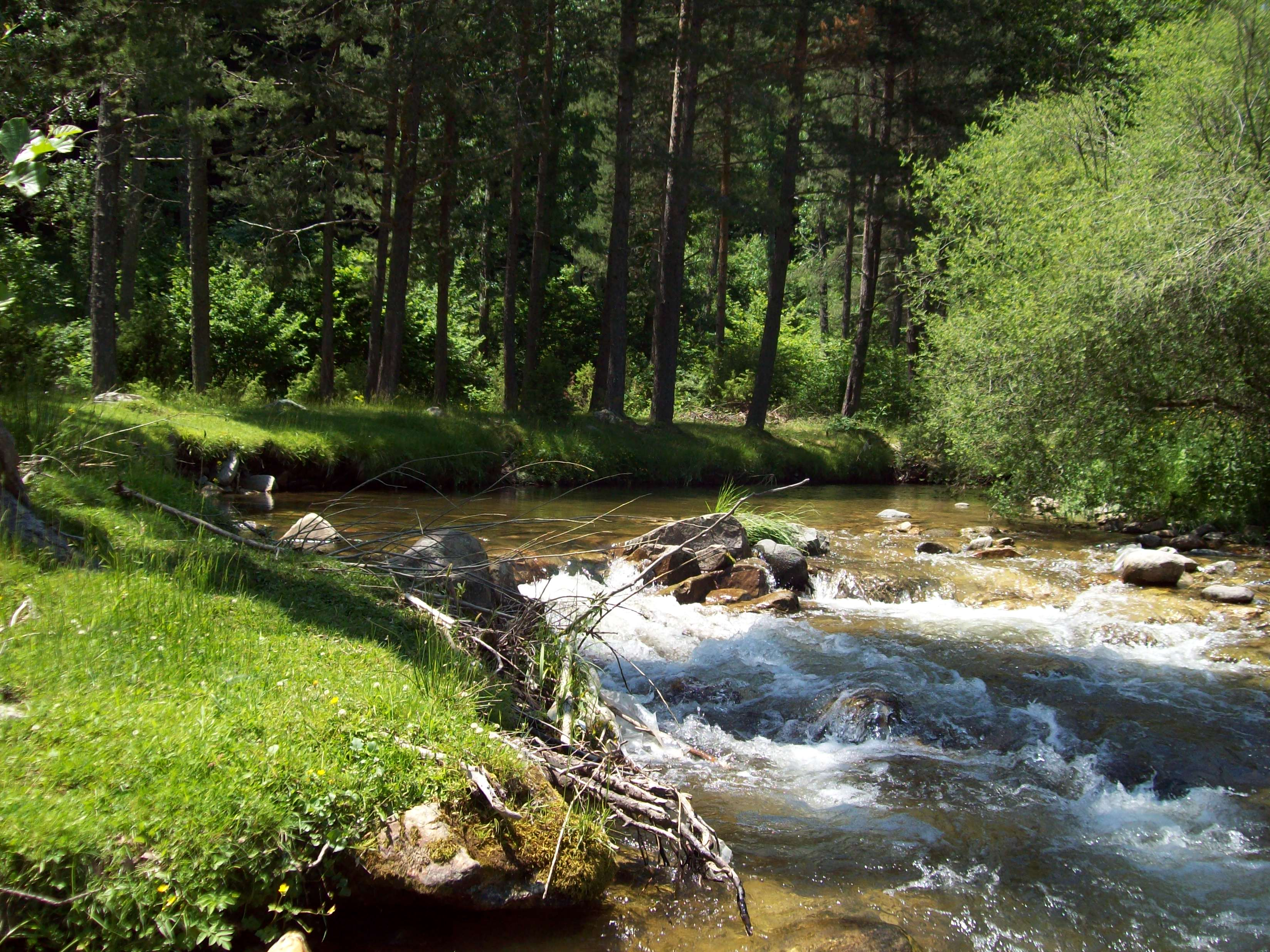

Location
- Country: Bulgaria

Physical characteristics
- Source
  - location: Momina Voda locality, Rhodope Mountains
  - coordinates: 41°42′12.96″N 24°48′11.16″E
  - elevation: 1,716 m (5,630 ft)
- Mouth
  - location: Arda→ Maritsa→ Aegean Sea
  - coordinates: 41°32′23.04″N 25°4′23.16″E
  - elevation: 488 m (1,601 ft)
- Length: 41 km (25 mi)
- Basin size: 142 km^{2} (55 sq mi)

The Malka Arda (Bulgarian: Малка Арда) is a 41 km long river in southern Bulgaria, a left tributary of the Arda of the Maritsa drainage.

The river takes its source under the name Mrazliv Dol at an altitude of 1,716 m in the Momuna Voda locality in the Pereliksko–Prespanski Ridge of the western Rhodope Mountains, north of the Momchul Yunak refuge. It flows in a deep narrow valley in a southeast direction until the village of Slaveyno, after which it turns south–southeast for the rest of its length. Near the village of Banite, the river passes through a small valley extension, after which its valley becomes canyon-like and difficult to access, with numerous meanders along the mountain slopes. It flows into the Arda at an altitude of 488 m some 2 km south of the village of Galabovo. It drains the southeastern slopes of the Pereliksko–Prespanski Ridge.

Its drainage basin covers a territory of 142 km^{2}, or 2.45% of the Arda's total. The river has predominantly rain–snow feed with high water in January and low water in August. The average annual flow at Banite is 2.11 m^{3}/s.

The Malka Arda flows entirely in Smolyan Province. There are six villages along its course — Kutela, Slaveyno and Petkovo in Smolyan Municipality, and Malka Arda, Oryahovets and Banite in Banite Municipality. There are hot mineral springs at Banite.

A 14.3 km stretch of the third class III-863 road Sokolovtsi–Slaveyno–Banite follows its valley between the latter two villages.
