= Dvoynitsa =

Location
- Country: Bulgaria

Physical characteristics
- Source
  - location: Eminska Planina, Balkan Mountains
  - coordinates: 42°49′41.99″N 27°29′47.04″E
  - elevation: 440 m (1,440 ft)
- Mouth
  - location: Black Sea
  - coordinates: 42°49′40.08″N 27°52′59.88″E
  - elevation: 0 m (0 ft)
- Length: 52 km (32 mi)
- Basin size: 479 km^{2} (185 sq mi)

The Dvoynitsa (Bulgarian: Двойница) is a 52 km long river in eastern Bulgaria that flows into the Black Sea.

== Geography ==
The river takes its source under the name Lekarnitsa from a spring at an altitude of 440 m in the Eminska Planina division of the Balkan Mountains. It flows in northern direction in a deep forested valley until the village of Golitsa. It then turns in direction east–southeast for the duration of its remaining course, as it valley widens and divides the Kamchiyska Planina to the north and Eminska Planina to the south. The Dvoynitsa flows into the Black Sea in the northeastern outskirts of the town of Obzor. Due to the small gradient, the river forms many meanders.

Its drainage basin covers a territory of 479 km^{2}. To the north its basin follows the ridge of the Kamchiyska Planina, which separates it from the neighbouring basins of the Kamchiya and the Fandakliyska reka. To the south the ridge of the Eminska Planina forms the boundary with the drainage systems of the Hadzhiyska reka and several small short rivers that empty into the Black Sea. The Dvoynitsa receives mainly rain feed, which forms 45% of the inflow. The period of high water lasts for four months, during which the average flow is 7 m^{3}/s. It largest tributary is the Velikovska reka (25 km).

== Nature ==
The river banks are covered with forest vegetation of willows, poplars, elms, ashes, linden, oaks and the rare Oriental beech, often overgrown with climbing vegetation of ivies, leather flowers and Smilax. At places there are reeds and cattails. There is diverse avifauna with at least 50 species only in the river mouth, such as common redshank, common moorhen, common sandpiper, common tern, mallard, great reed warbler, common kingfisher, western yellow wagtail, squacco heron, grey heron, little egret, etc. Local birds of prey include Eurasian sparrowhawk, common buzzard, Eurasian scops owl, tawny owl and little owl. There are fish populations of Eurasian carp, common chub, Romanian barbel, Flathead grey mullet and others, that support the aquatic birds.

== Settlements and economy ==
The Dvoynitsa flows in Burgas and Varna Provinces and downstream of Golitsa its valley serves as border between the two administrative divisions. There are three settlements along its course, the village of Koznitsa and the town of Obzor in Nesebar Municipality of Burgas Province and village of Popovich in Byala Municipality of Varna Province. Its waters in the middle and lower course are utilised for irrigation, the main crops being barley, maize, peaches, apples, grapes, almonds, lavender.

== History ==
In the Antiquity the river was crossed by a Roman road that followed the Black Sea Coast linking a road station and castrum at the modern town of Obzor just south of the river to the settlement at Cape St. Athanasius a few kilometers to the north. The castrum at Obzor was abandoned in the 5th–6th century AD. Along the ridge of the Eminska Planina south of the river there were several fortresses that protected the northern border of the Byzantine Empire. In the 13th and 14th century the Bulgarian Empire constructed the important fortress and town of Kozyak on a height over river banks some 3 km upstream from its mouth, which guarded the only road along the coastline. During the Uprising of Ivaylo (1277–1280) Kozyak was temporarily occupied by the Byzantines. In 1366 the fortress was one of the several Bulgarian maritime strongholds captured by Amadeus VI, Count of Savoy during the Savoyard Crusade. It was finally destroyed in the late 14th century during the Bulgarian–Ottoman wars.
