= Arapliyska reka =

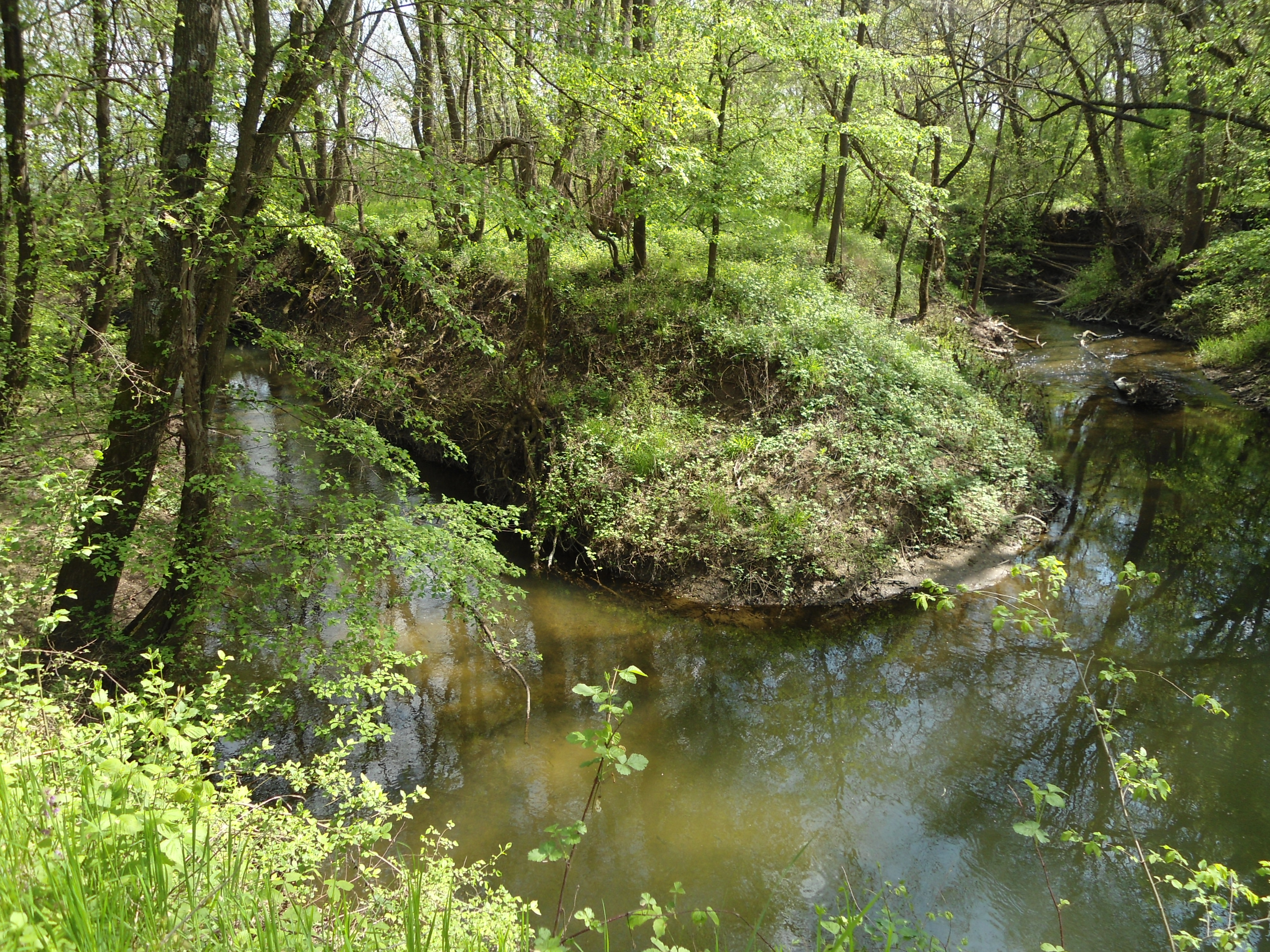

Location
- Country: Bulgaria

Physical characteristics
- Source
  - location: Dervent Heights
  - coordinates: 41°59′17.88″N 26°46′54.84″E
  - elevation: 484 m (1,588 ft)
- Mouth
  - location: Popovska reka
  - coordinates: 42°7′50.10″N 26°32′00.12″E
  - elevation: 98 m (322 ft)
- Length: 42 km (26 mi)
- Basin size: 351 km^{2} (136 sq mi)

Basin features
- Progression: Popovska reka→ Tundzha→ Maritsa

The Arapliyska reka (Bulgarian: Араплийска река) is a river in southern Bulgaria, a left tributary of the river Popovska reka, itself a left tributary of the Tundzha of the Maritsa drainage, with a length of 42 km. It is the largest tributary of the Popovska reka.

The river takes its source under the name Golyama Derbventska reka at an altitude of 484 m in the Dervent Heights, about half a kilometer southwest of the peak of Charakbaba (540 m) on the Bulgaria–Turkey border. It flows in a narrow forested valley initially in western direction until the village of Valcha Polyana, it then turns north until Razdel and finally northwest until Chernozem, where it is joined by the Boyalashka reka. Downstream of Chernozem its valley widens and river makes meanders. It flows into the Popovska at an altitude of 98 m just 350 m east of the latter's confluence with the Tundzha, and is sometimes erroneously considered a tributary of the Tundzha.

Its drainage basin covers a territory of 351 km^{2} or 65.9% of the Popovska reka's total. The largest tributary is the Boyalashka reka (33 km). The Arapliyska reka has predominantly rain feed with high water in autumn and winter.

The river flows entirely in Yambol Province. There are five settlements along its course, one town and four villages: Golyam Dervent, Valcha Polyana, Razdel and Chernozem in Elhovo Municipality. Its waters are utilised for irrigation.
