= Vidbol =

Location
- Country: Bulgaria

Physical characteristics
- Source
  - location: Babin Nos, Balkan Mountains
  - coordinates: 43°43′5.16″N 22°24′25.92″E
  - elevation: 1,000 m (3,300 ft)
- Mouth
  - location: Danube
  - coordinates: 43°53′53.16″N 22°50′18.96″E
  - elevation: 29 m (95 ft)
- Length: 62 km (39 mi)
- Basin size: 330 km^{2} (130 sq mi)

Basin features
- Progression: Danube→ Black Sea

The Vidbol (Bulgarian: Видбол) is a river in northwestern Bulgaria, a right tributary of the Danube. Its length is 62 km.

The river takes its source under the name Dzhonovets at an altitude of about 1,000 m, some 300 m northeast of the summit of Babin Nos (1,103 m) in the northwestern part of the Balkan Mountains. It is situated in the western Danubian Plain. The river flows in northeastern direction in a forested valley until the village of Rakovitsa and then continues eastwards to Gara Makresh. In this section the Vidbol takes several of its most significant tributaries. From Gara Makresh the river bends north and runs through a deep canyon-like valley. At the village of Sinagovtsi it turns east, enters the Vidin Plain and flows into the Danube at an altitude of 29 m, some 2 km east of the town of Dunavtsi.

Its drainage basin covers a territory of 330 km^{2} and is situated between the basins of the rivers Voynishka reka to the north, the Archar to the south and southeast, and the Timok along the Babin Nos ridge to the west. The river has predominantly rain feed with high water in April–June and low water in August–October. It partially dries out in summer. The average annual discharge at Dunavtsi is 0.8 m^{3}/s.

The Vidbol flows entirely in Vidin Province. There are seven settlements along its course, the villages of Rakovitsa, Tsar Shishmanovo, Makresh, Valchek, Sratsimirovo and Sinagovtsi, as well as the town of Dunavtsi. There two main roads along its lower and middle valley, a 14 km stretch of the third class III-1403 road between Tsar Shishmanovo and Gara Makresh, and an 6.1 km section of the third class III-1413 road between Dunavtsi and the refuge of Bozhuritsa. Its waters are utilized for irrigation.
