= II-21 road (Bulgaria) =

Road in Bulgaria

Republic Road I-21
- Републикански път I-21

Route information
- Length: 114.9 km (71.4 mi)

Major junctions
- From: Km 1.5 of I-2, Ruse
- To: Km 8.8 of I-7

Location
- Country: Bulgaria

Highway system
- Highways in Bulgaria

Republican Road II-21 (Bulgarian: Републикански път II-21) is a second-class road in northeastern Bulgaria, running through Ruse and Silistra Provinces. Its length is 114.9 km.

== Route description ==
The road starts at Km 1.5 of the first class I-2 road in the eastern outskirts of the city of Ruse close to the Bulgaria–Romania border checkpoint Ruse–Giurgiu and follows the right bank of the river Danube along most of its route. It runs through the towns of Marten and Slivo Pole, as well as the village of Brashlen in the Pobrezhie Plain, and enters Silistra Province. There, it goes through Nova Cherna, bypasses the town of Tutrakan from the south and turns east, moving away from the Danube. The road passes through the villages of Tarnovtsi, Bogdantsi, Zafirovo, Kolarovo, Nova Popina and Srebarna. Just east of the village the II-21 bypasses the UNESCO World Heritage Site Lake Srebarna from the south, ascends the Dobrudzha Plateau, bypasses the village of Kalipetrovo from the south and southeast, and reaches its terminus at Km 8.8 of the first class I-7 road.
