= Beli Lom (river) =

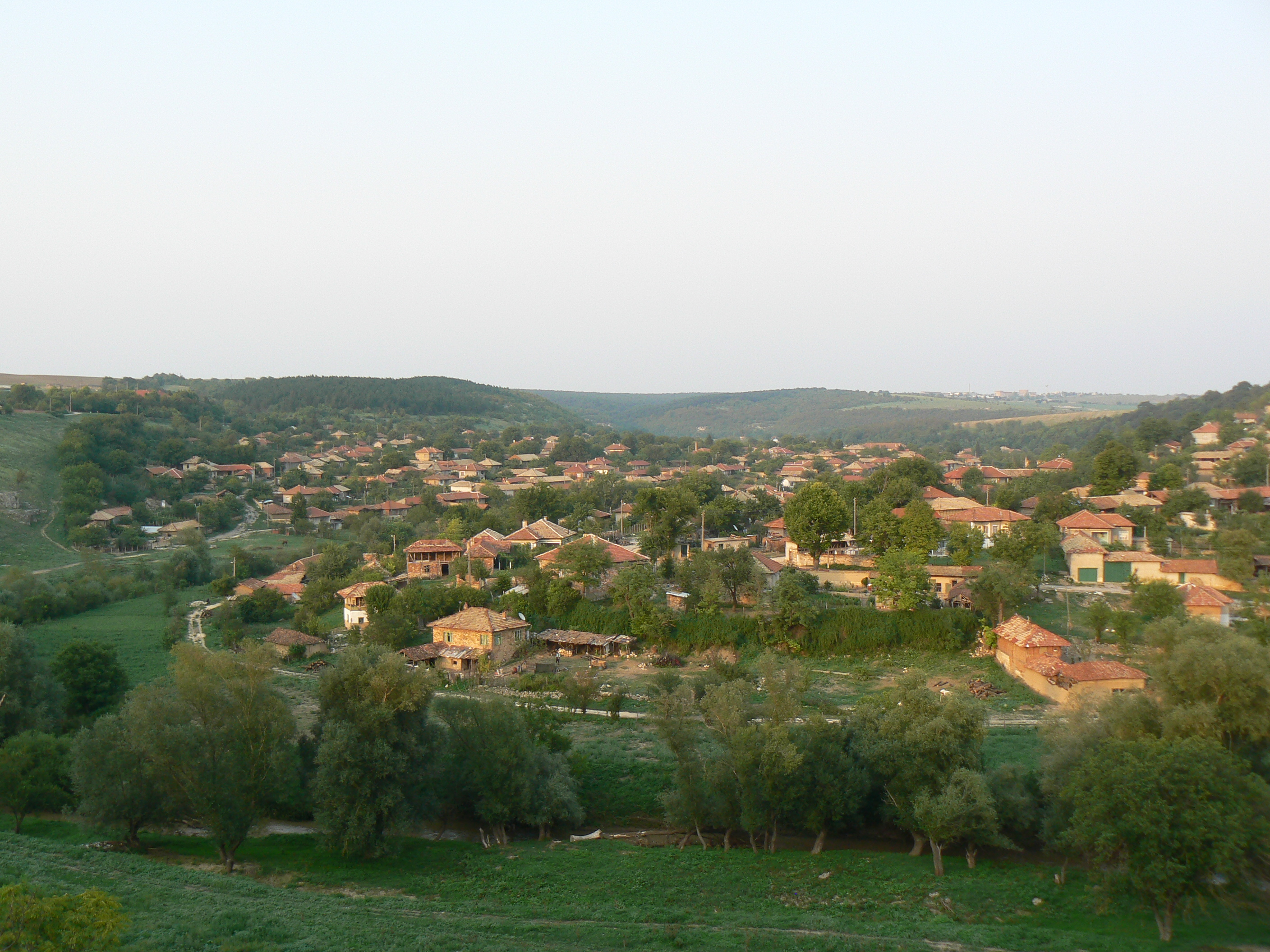
- The Beli Lom at Krivnya

Location
- Country: Bulgaria

Physical characteristics
- Source
  - location: Razgrad Heights
  - coordinates: 43°26′25.08″N 26°29′20.04″E
  - elevation: 404 m (1,325 ft)
- Mouth
  - location: Rusenski Lom
  - coordinates: 43°41′7.08″N 26°0′3.96″E
  - elevation: 47 m (154 ft)
- Length: 147 km (91 mi)
- Basin size: 1,549 km^{2} (598 sq mi)

Basin features
- Progression: Rusenski Lom→ Danube→ Black Sea

The Beli Lom (Bulgarian: Бели Лом) is a 147 km-long river in northern Bulgaria, a right tributary of the river Rusenski Lom, itself a right tributary of the Danube. It is considered to be the main stem of the Rusenski Lom.

== Geography ==
The Beli Lom takes its source from a spring at an altitude of 404 m in the Razgrad Heights, some 500 m west of the village of Ostrovche. It flows east–southeast until the Beli Lom Reservoir and then heads northwest, running through the towns of Razgrad and Senovo. From its source to the village of Dryanovets the Beli Lom flows in a wide valley. Downstream of the village the valley becomes canyon-like with rocky slopes of Aptian limestone. In that section the river forms numerous meanders. Its confluence with the Cherni Lom at an altitude of 47 m some 3.2 km east of the village of Ivanovo forms the river Rusenski Lom. Its upper and middle course separate the Samuilovo Heights to the northeast and the Razgrad Heights to the southwest. The river flows entirely in the Danubian Plain.

Its drainage basin covers a territory of 1,549 km^{2} or 53.9% of the Rusenski Lom's total. Its largest tributary is the Malki Lom (57 km).

The Beli Lom has a rain–snow feed with high water in March–June and low water in July–October. About 60% of the total discharge flows in spring. The average annual discharge is 0.86 m^{3}/s at Razgrad and 2.09 m^{3}/s at the mouth.

== Settlements and economy ==
The river flows in Razgrad and Ruse Provinces. There are 11 settlements along its course, two towns and nine villages. In the former province are located Manastirsko and Kamenar in Loznitsa Municipality, and Ostrovche, Ushintsi, Razgrad (town), Getsovo and Dryanovets in Razgrad Municipality. In Ruse Province are Senovo (town), Krivnya and Pisanets in Vetovo Municipality, as well as Nisovo in Ivanovo Municipality. Its waters are utilized for irrigation, especially in the upper and middle course. The large Beli Lom Reservoir taps water for the surrounding arable lands and provides opportunities for fishing and outdoor activities.

The lower part of the river falls within the Rusenski Lom Nature Park, protecting the rich wildlife, rock formations and cave sanctuaries dated from the Second Bulgarian Empire of the 12th to 14th centuries.

A 25 km section of the first class I-2 road Ruse–Razgrad–Varna follows the river valley between the villages of Osenets and Beli Lom.
