= Deleynska reka =

Location
- Country: Bulgaria

Physical characteristics
- Source
  - location: Balkan Mountains
  - coordinates: 44°1′45.12″N 22°32′29.04″E
  - elevation: 297 m (974 ft)
- Mouth
  - location: Danube
  - coordinates: 44°0′24.84″N 22°49′45.12″E
  - elevation: 37 m (121 ft)
- Length: 33 km (21 mi)
- Basin size: 102 km^{2} (39 sq mi)

Basin features
- Progression: Topolovets→ Danube

The Deleynska reka (Bulgarian: Делейнска река) is a river in northwestern Bulgaria, a left tributary of the Topolovets, itself a right tributary of the Danube. Its length is 33 km.

The river takes its source on the Bulgaria–Serbia border at an altitude of 328 m in the northwesternmost part of the Balkan Mountains, some 1.5 km northwest of the village of Rabrovo. It flows in the western Danubian Plain. The river flows in direction northeast and east, before bending to the southeast at the village of Tiyanovtsi. It then passes through Kalina and Inovo, where it turns southwest. It flows into the Topolovets at an altitude of 37 m about 2.3 km northwest of the city of Vidin.

Its drainage basin covers a territory of 102 km^{2}, or 17.4% of the Topolovets's total.

The Deleynska reka flows entirely in Vidin Province. Its waters are utilized for irrigation.
