= Voynishka reka =

Location
- Country: Bulgaria

Physical characteristics
- Source
  - location: Babin Nos, Balkan Mountains
  - coordinates: 43°46′0.12″N 22°24′0″E
  - elevation: 664 m (2,178 ft)
- Mouth
  - location: Danube
  - coordinates: 43°54′51.84″N 22°50′33″E
  - elevation: 32 m (105 ft)
- Length: 55 km (34 mi)
- Basin size: 276 km^{2} (107 sq mi)

Basin features
- Progression: Danube→ Black Sea

The Voynishka reka (Bulgarian: Войнишка река) is a river in northwestern Bulgaria, a right tributary of the Danube. Its length is 55 km.

The river takes its source under the name Chichilka reka at an altitude of 664 m, less than a kilometer northwest of the summit of Chernoglav (858 m) in the northwestern part of the Balkan Mountains. It is situated in the western Danubian Plain. The river initially flows in northeastern direction, running through the Kravarski Dol Reservoir, the village of Staropatitsa, the Poletkovtsi Reservoir and the homonymous village and the village of Chichil. Downstream from the latter the river turns eastwards and 2 km southwest from Voynitsa it receives its tributary the Koromanitsa, passes through the villages of Bukovets and Tarlyane and flows into the Danube at an altitude of 32 m.

Its drainage basin covers a territory of 276 km^{2} and is situated between the basins of the rivers Topolovets to the north and northwest, the Vidbol to the south and southeast, and the Timok along the Babin Nos ridge to the west. The river has predominantly rain–snow feed with high water in March–May and low water in August–October. It dries out in summer. The average annual discharge at Tarlyane is 0.91 m^{3}/s.

The Voynishka reka flows entirely in Vidin Province. There are six settlements along its course, the villages of Staropatitsa, Poletkovtsi, Chichil, Bukovets and Tarlyane, as well as the town of Dunavtsi. Its waters are utilized for irrigation.
