= Topchiyska reka =

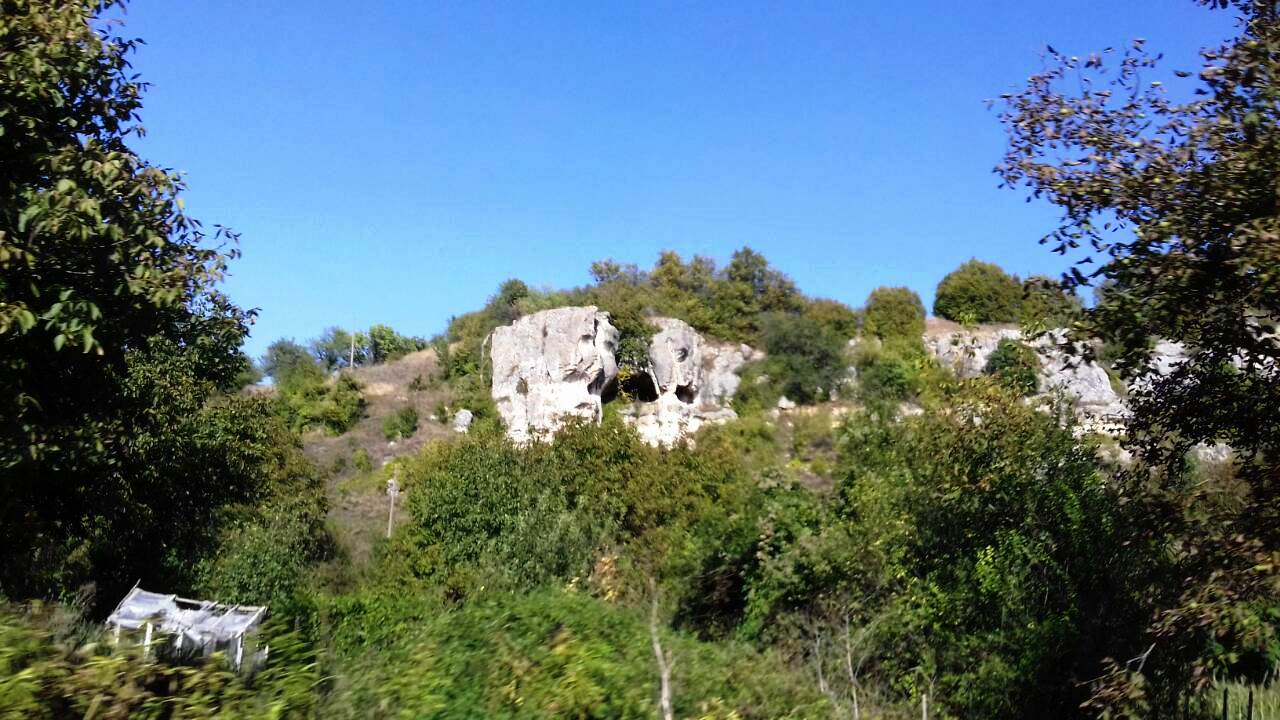
- Rock formation along the river valley

Location
- Country: Bulgaria

Physical characteristics
- Source
  - location: Ludogorie Plateau
  - coordinates: 43°34′50.16″N 26°36′11.04″E
  - elevation: 293 m (961 ft)
- Mouth
  - location: Danube
  - coordinates: 44°1′21″N 26°18′39.96″E
  - elevation: 14 m (46 ft)
- Length: 89 km (55 mi)
- Basin size: 660 km^{2} (250 sq mi)

Basin features
- Progression: Danube→ Black Sea

The Topchiyska reka (Bulgarian: Топчийска река) is a river in northeastern Bulgaria, a right tributary of the Danube. Its length is 89 km. Part of the river valley forms the western boundary of the Ludogorie region.

The Topchiyska reka takes its source from a spring at an altitude of 293 m in the western part of the Ludogorets Plateau, about a kilometer southeast the village of Lipnik and close to the town of Razgrad. With the exception of its uppermost course, the river flows in a deep valley cut in Aptian limestones. It flows north until the village of Pobit Kamak, then west until Topchii and then north again. West of the town of Kubrat the Topchiyska reka dries up, its valley heading west and until taking a final turn north. At the village of Malko Vranovo it reaches the Pobrezhie Plain, there the river bed is replaced by irrigation and drainage canals. It flows into the Danube in front of the Bulgarian island of Mishka at an altitude of 14 m.

Its drainage basin covers a territory of 660 km^{2} or 0.08% of the Danube's total. The river has irregular water flow and low annual discharge. The river density in its basin is very low, between 0.1 and 0.2 km/km^{2}.

The Topchiyska reka flows in Razgrad and Ruse Provinces. There are five villages along its course, Pobit Kamak and Topchii in Razgrad Municipality, Kameno in Kubrat Municipality, as well as Malko Vranovo and Golyamo Vranovo in Slivo Pole Municipality. The former three are in Razgrad Province, and the latter fall within two in Ruse Province. Its waters in the upper and lower course are utilized for irrigation.

A 14.5 km section of the second class II-49 road Targovishte–Razgrad–Tutrakan follows the river valley.
