= Popovska reka =

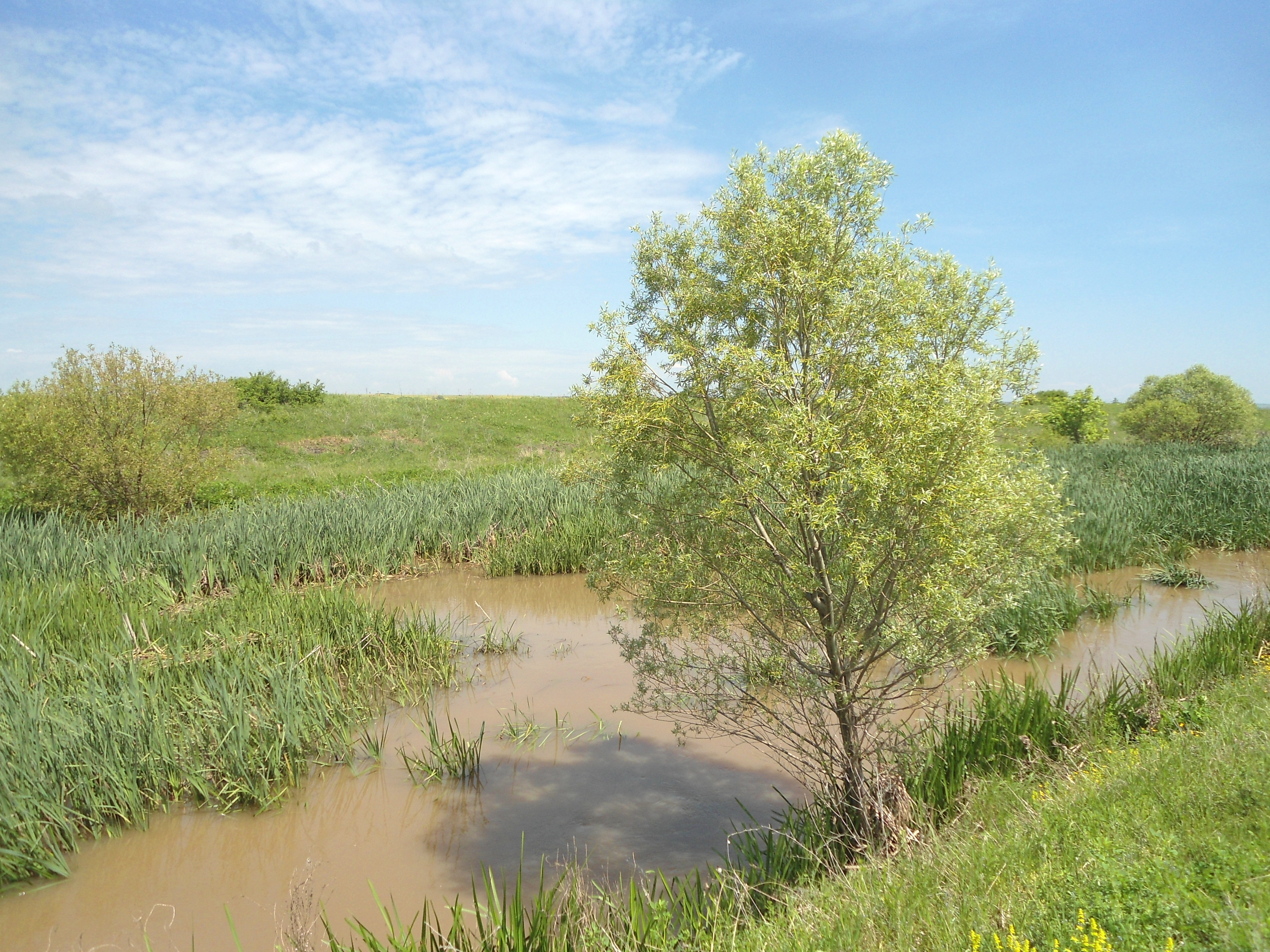

Location
- Country: Bulgaria

Physical characteristics
- Source
  - location: Dervent Heights
  - coordinates: 42°0′12.96″N 26°51′51″E
  - elevation: 482 m (1,581 ft)
- Mouth
  - location: Tundzha
  - coordinates: 42°7′50.16″N 26°31′46.92″E
  - elevation: 98 m (322 ft)
- Length: 72 km (45 mi)
- Basin size: 533 km^{2} (206 sq mi)

Basin features
- Progression: Tundzha→ Maritsa

The Popovska reka (Bulgarian: Поповска река) is a river in southern Bulgaria, a left tributary of the river Tundzha of the Maritsa drainage, with a length of 72 km. It is the second largest tributary of the Tundzha.

The river takes its source under the name Vodenska reka at an altitude of 482 m in the eastern part of the Dervent Heights, just north of the Bulgaria–Turkey border. In its upper course until the village of Voden it flows in a narrow forested valley, initially westwards and then northwards. Downstream of the village the river turns northwest. Its valley remains narrow but generally deforested until the town of Bolyarovo. After Bolyarovo the valley widens, the river makes meanders and changes direction several times — northeast after the town, northwest at Dabovo and southwest downstream of Popovo. The Popovska reka enters the Elhovo Field after the village of Dobrich. It flows into the Tundzha at an altitude of 98 m south of the town of Elhovo near the first class I-7 road.

Its drainage basin covers a territory of 533 km^{2} or 6.32% of the Tundzha's total. The largest tributary is the Arapliyska reka (42 km).

The Popovska reka has predominantly rain feed with high water in February and low water in July–November. The average annual flow is at the Malko Sharkovo Reservoir is 0.9 m^{3}/s.

The river flows entirely in Yambol Province. There are five settlements along its course, one town and four villages: Voden, Bolyarovo (town), Dabovo and Popovo in Bolyarovo Municipality, and Dobrich in Elhovo Municipality. Its waters are utilised for irrigation.
