= Boynitsa =

Boynitsa Бойница
- Location of Boynitsa
- Coordinates: 43°57′N 22°32′E
- Country: Bulgaria
- Provinces (Oblast): Vidin

Government
  - Mayor: Aneta Gencheva
- Elevation: 241 m (791 ft)

Population (2008)
  - Total: 628
- Time zone: UTC+2 (EET)
  - Summer (DST): UTC+3 (EEST)
- Postal Code: 3840
- Area code: 09333

Boynitsa (Bulgarian: Бойница, pronounced [ˈbɔjnit͡sɐ]; also transliterated Bojnica, Bojnitsa, Boinitsa, Boynitza, Boinitza, Boinica, etc.; Romanian: Boinița) is a village in northwestern Bulgaria, part of Vidin Province. It is the administrative centre of Boynitsa Municipality, which lies in the western part of Vidin Province. The village is located 35 kilometers west of the provincial capital Vidin and 250 kilometers northwest of the national capital Sofia, in the immediate proximity of the Serbian border.

The town is named after the Bulgarian freedom-fighter Boyana Voivode, who led a group of 70-80 Bulgarian rebels fighting for Bulgaria's freedom from the Ottoman Empire. She and her band of rebels were active mainly in the northwest of present-day Bulgaria.

== Municipality ==
Boynitsa municipality covers an area of 166 square kilometres and includes the following 8 places:

- Boynitsa
- Borilovets
- Gradskovski Kolibi
- Kanits
- Perilovets
- Rabrovo
- Shipikova Mahala
- Shishentsi
