= Senkovets =

Seknovets
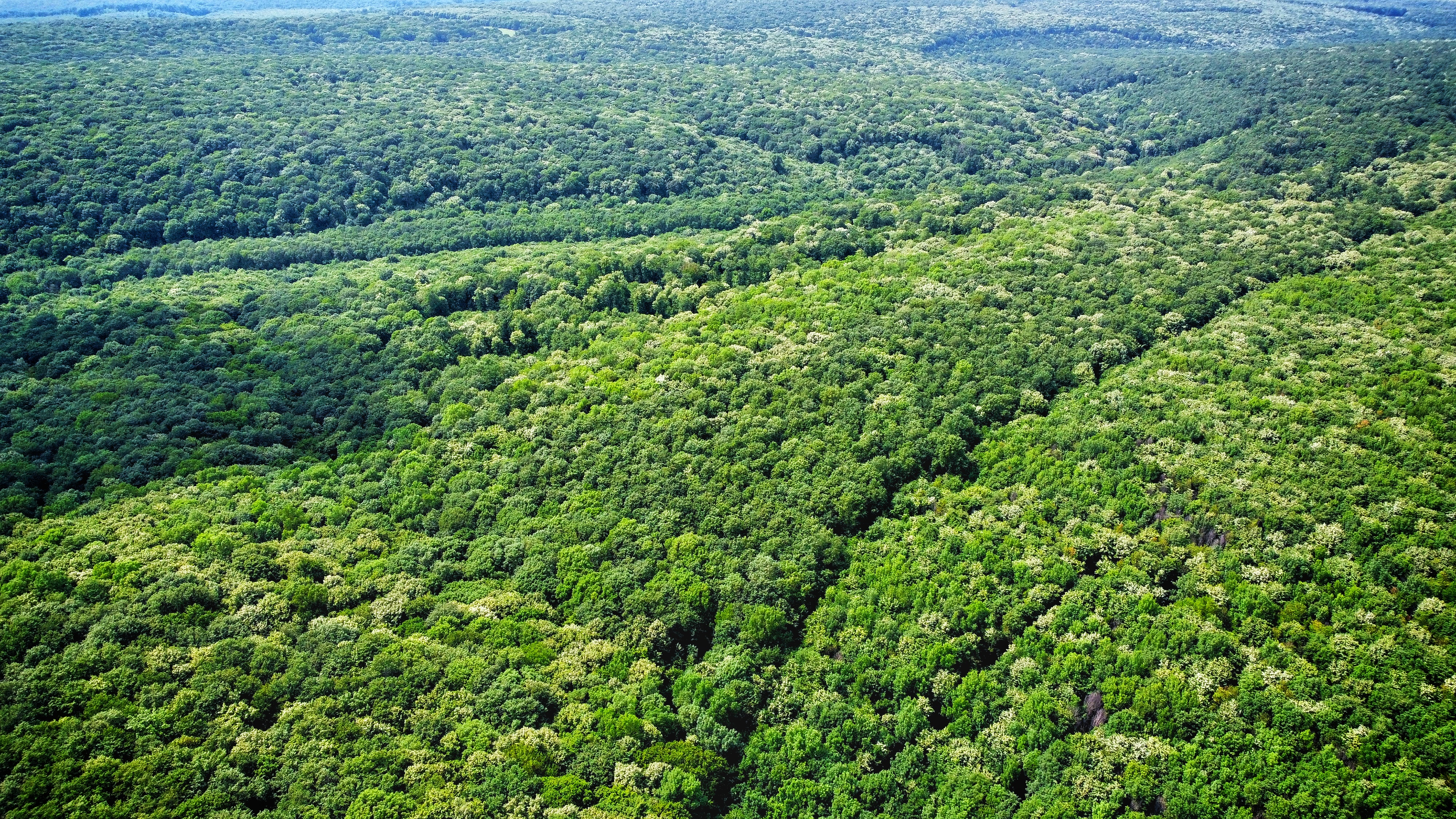
- The heavily forested river bed close to Zvenimir

Location
- Country: Bulgaria

Physical characteristics
- Source
  - location: Samuilovo Heights
  - coordinates: 43°28′5.88″N 26°46′42.96″E
  - elevation: 448 m (1,470 ft)
- Mouth
  - location: Danube
  - coordinates: 44°7′8.04″N 26°54′20.88″E
  - elevation: 11 m (36 ft)
- Length: 102 km (63 mi)
- Basin size: 553 km^{2} (214 sq mi)

Basin features
- Progression: Danube→ Black Sea

The Senkovets (Bulgarian: Сенковец) is a river in the Ludogorie region of northeastern Bulgaria, a right tributary of the Danube. Its length is 102 km.

The Senkovets takes its source under the name Sazlaka from a spring at an altitude of 448 m in the Samuilovo Heights, in the eastern outskirts the village of Visoka Polyana. It flows north through in a deep canyon-like valley cut in Aptian limestones and loess sediments. It dries up downstream of the village of Kitanchevo. Downstream of the village of Bosna the valley widens to over a kilometer, while the slopes remain steep reaching a height of over 50 m. The river flows into the Danube in front of the Bulgarian island of Garvan at an altitude of 11 m.

Its drainage basin covers a territory of 553 km^{2} or 0.07% of the Danube's total. The river has rain–snow feed and is also fed by karst springs. The water flow is not constant. The average annual discharge at the town of Isperih is 0.166 m^{3}/s.

The Senkovets flows in Razgrad, Shumen and Silistra Provinces. There are 12 villages along its course. In Shumen Province are Yasenkovo in Venets Municipality, and Visoka Polyana in Hitrino Municipality. In Razgrad Province are situated Krivitsa, Golyama Voda, Kara Mihal and Nozharovo in Samuil Municipality, and Kitanchevo and Yakim Gruevo in Isperih Municipality. In Silistra Province are located Zvenimir and Padina in Glavinitsa Municipality, and Bosna and Garvan in Sitovo Municipality. Its waters in the upper and lower course are utilized for irrigation.
