= Razgrad Municipality =

Razgrad Municipality Община Разград
- Municipality
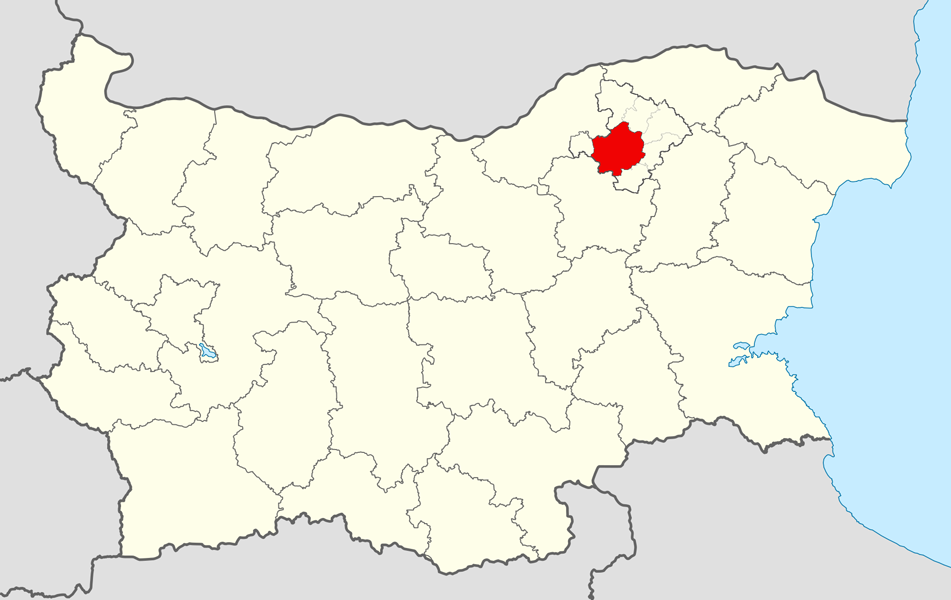
- Razgrad Municipality within Bulgaria and Razgrad Province.
- Coordinates: 43°32′N 26°30′E
- Country: Bulgaria
- Province (Oblast): Razgrad
- Admin. centre (Obshtinski tsentar): Razgrad

Area
  - Total: 620 km^{2} (240 sq mi)

Population (December 2009)
  - Total: 54,720
  - Density: 88/km^{2} (230/sq mi)
- Time zone: UTC+2 (EET)
  - Summer (DST): UTC+3 (EEST)

Razgrad Municipality (Bulgarian: Община Разград) is a municipality (obshtina) in Razgrad Province, Northeastern Bulgaria, located in the Ludogorie geographical region part of the Danubian Plain. It is named after its administrative centre - the city of Razgrad which is also the capital of the province.

The municipality embraces a territory of 620 km^{2} (240 sq mi) with a population of 54,720 inhabitants, as of December 2009.

The main road E70 crosses the area, connecting the main town with the city of Ruse and the Danube Bridge.

== Settlements ==
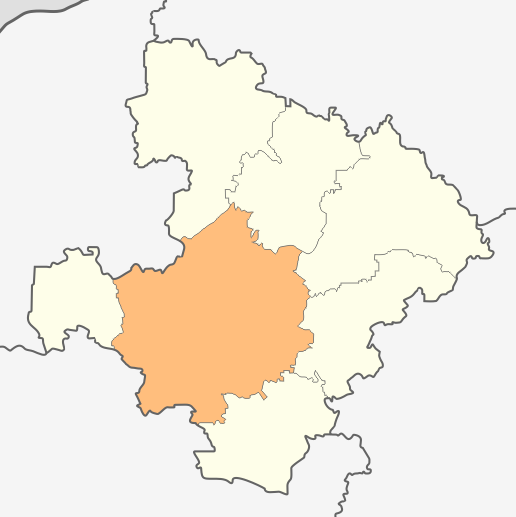
Razgrad Municipality within Razgrad Province

Razgrad Municipality includes the following 22 places (towns are shown in bold):

Town/Village	Cyrillic	Population (December 2009)
**Razgrad**	**Разград**	34,592
Balkanski	Балкански	322
Blagoevo	Благоево	640
Cherkovna	Черковна	148
Dryanovets	Дряновец	811
Dyankovo	Дянково	2,913
Getsovo	Гецово	1,902
Kichenitsa	Киченица	923
Lipnik	Липник	584
Mortagonovo	Мортагоново	1,091
Nedoklan	Недоклан	212
Osenets	Осенец	1,081
Ostrovche	Островче	164
Pobit Kamak	Побит камък	312
Prostorno	Просторно	189
Poroishte	Пороище	505
Radingrad	Радинград	306
Rakovski	Раковски	2,568
Strazhets	Стражец	1,957
Topchii	Топчии	568
Ushintsi	Ушинци	264
Yasenovets	Ясеновец	2,668
Total		54,720

== Demography ==
The following table shows the change of the population during the last four decades.

Razgrad Municipality
Year	1975	1985	1992	2001	2005	2007	2009	2011
Population	64,930	98,547	61,815	58,874	56,795	55,689	54,720	...
Sources: Census 2001, Census 2011, „pop-stat.mashke.org“,

== See also ==
- Provinces of Bulgaria
- Municipalities of Bulgaria
- List of cities and towns in Bulgaria
