= Cherni Lom =

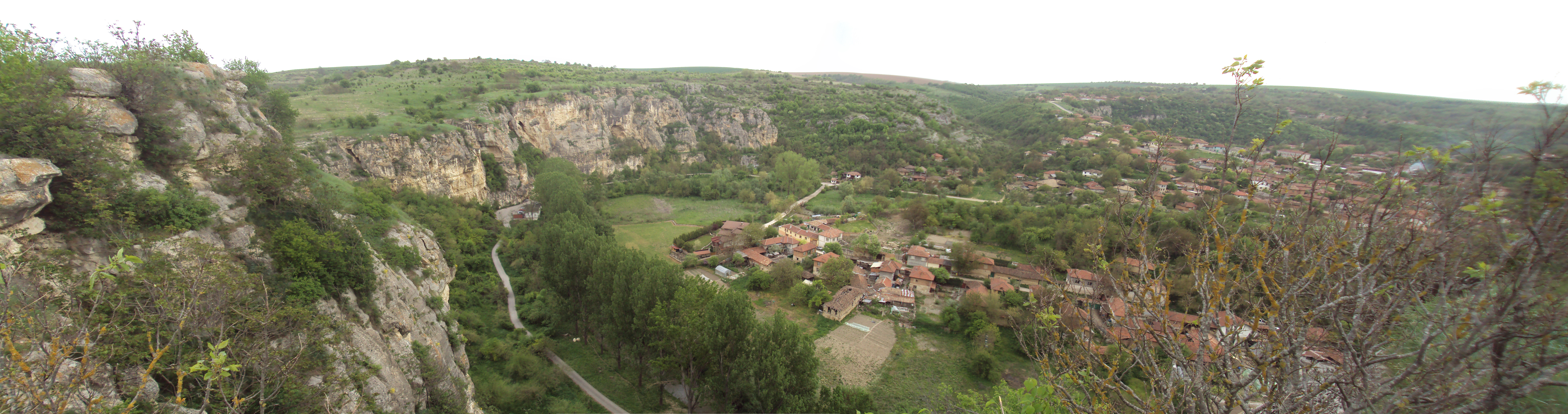
- Panoramic view of the river canyon at Cherven

Location
- Country: Bulgaria

Physical characteristics
- Source
  - location: Lilyak Plateau
  - coordinates: 43°14′22.92″N 26°26′6″E
  - elevation: 480 m (1,570 ft)
- Mouth
  - location: Rusenski Lom
  - coordinates: 43°41′7.08″N 26°0′3.96″E
  - elevation: 47 m (154 ft)
- Length: 130 km (81 mi)
- Basin size: 1,276 km^{2} (493 sq mi)

Basin features
- Progression: Rusenski Lom→ Danube→ Black Sea

The Cherni Lom (Bulgarian: Черни Лом) is a 130 km-long river in northern Bulgaria, a right tributary of the river Rusenski Lom, itself a right tributary of the Danube.

== Geography ==
The Cherni Lom takes its source at an altitude of 480 m on the southern foothills of the Lilyak Plateau, some 1.3 km northeast of the village of Aleksandrovo. Until receiving its tributary the Baniski Lom the river flows in a wide valley, first westwards, then north to the village of Kardam, and finally northwest to the confluence with the Baniski Lom. Downstream the river turns north and the valley becomes canyon-like, deeply cut in Aptian limestones and marls. Due to the low gradient in that section the Cherni Lom forms meanders. Its confluence with the Beli Lom at an altitude of 47 m some 3.2 km east of the village of Ivanovo forms the river Rusenski Lom.

Its drainage basin covers a territory of 1,276 km^{2} or 44.4% of the Rusenski Lom's total. Its largest tributary is the Baniski Lom (57 km). The Cherni Lom has a rain–snow feed with high water in March–June and low water in July–October.

== Settlements and landmarks ==
The river flows in Targovishte and Ruse Provinces. There are 12 settlements along its course, one town and 10 villages. In the former province are located Aleksandrovo in Targovishte Municipality, Aprilovo and Kardam in Popovo Municipality, and Opaka (town) and Krepcha in Opaka Municipality. In Ruse Province are Katselovo, Ostritsa, Shirokovo and Pepelina in Dve Mogili Municipality, as well as Tabachka, Cherven and Koshov in Ivanovo Municipality. Its waters are utilized for irrigation, especially in the upper and middle course.

The lower part of the river falls within the Rusenski Lom Nature Park, protecting the rich wildlife, rock formations and cave sanctuaries dated from the Second Bulgarian Empire of the 12th to 14th centuries. There are numerous caves along the Cherni Lom valley, including Orlova Chuka on the left bank, which is the third longest cave in Bulgaria with a length of over 13.4 km. The ruins of the important medieval Bulgarian fortress of Cherven rise over a steep meander of the river near the homonymous village.

There are two main roads along the Cherni Lom valley, a 29.1 km section of the third class III-202 road Ruse–Popovo follows the river's left bank between Katselovo and Popovo, and a 14.5 km section of the third class III-409 road Svetlen–Omurtag follows the river's left bank between Svetlen and Konak.

== Gallery ==
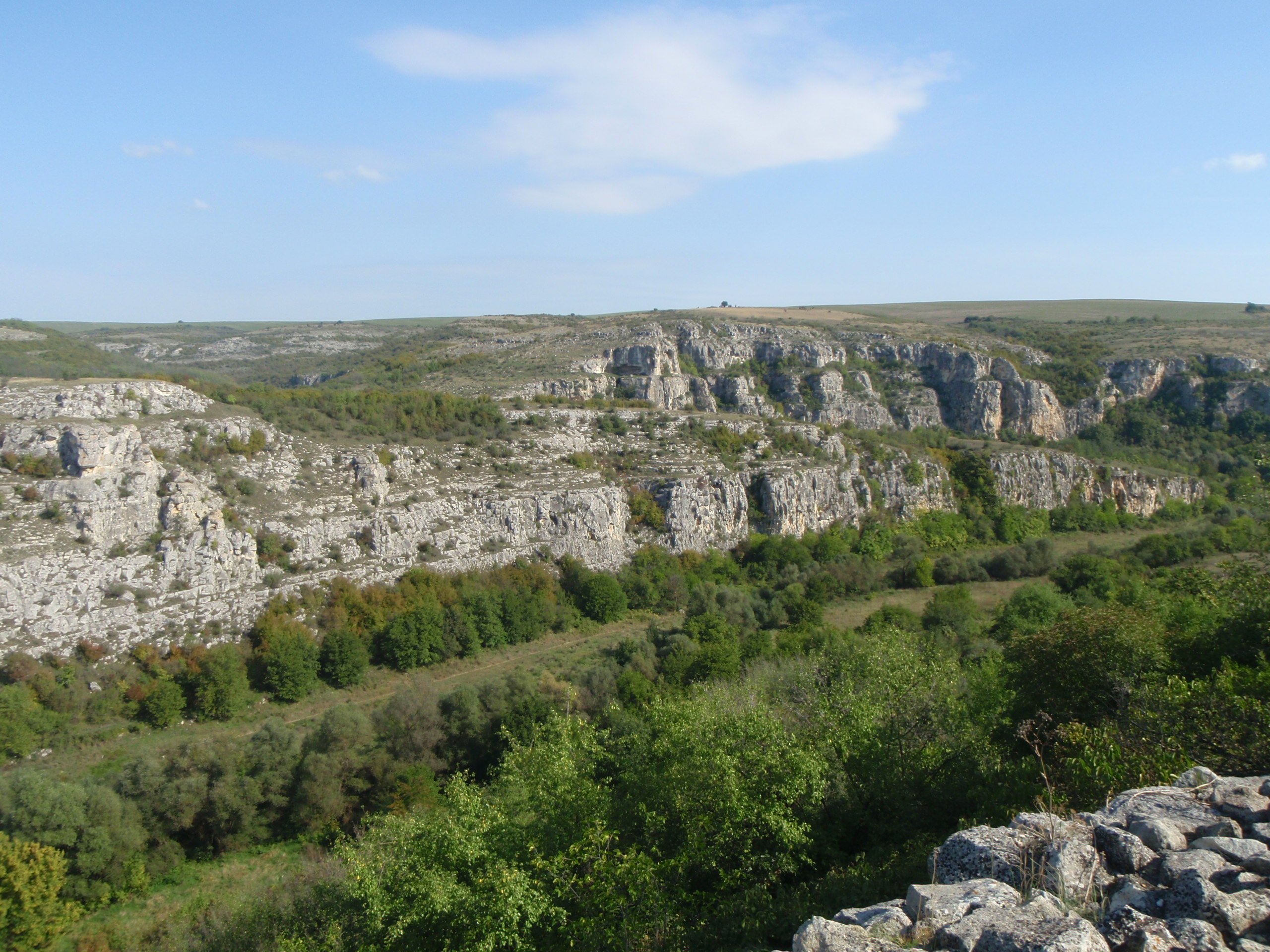
The canyon of the Cherni Lom

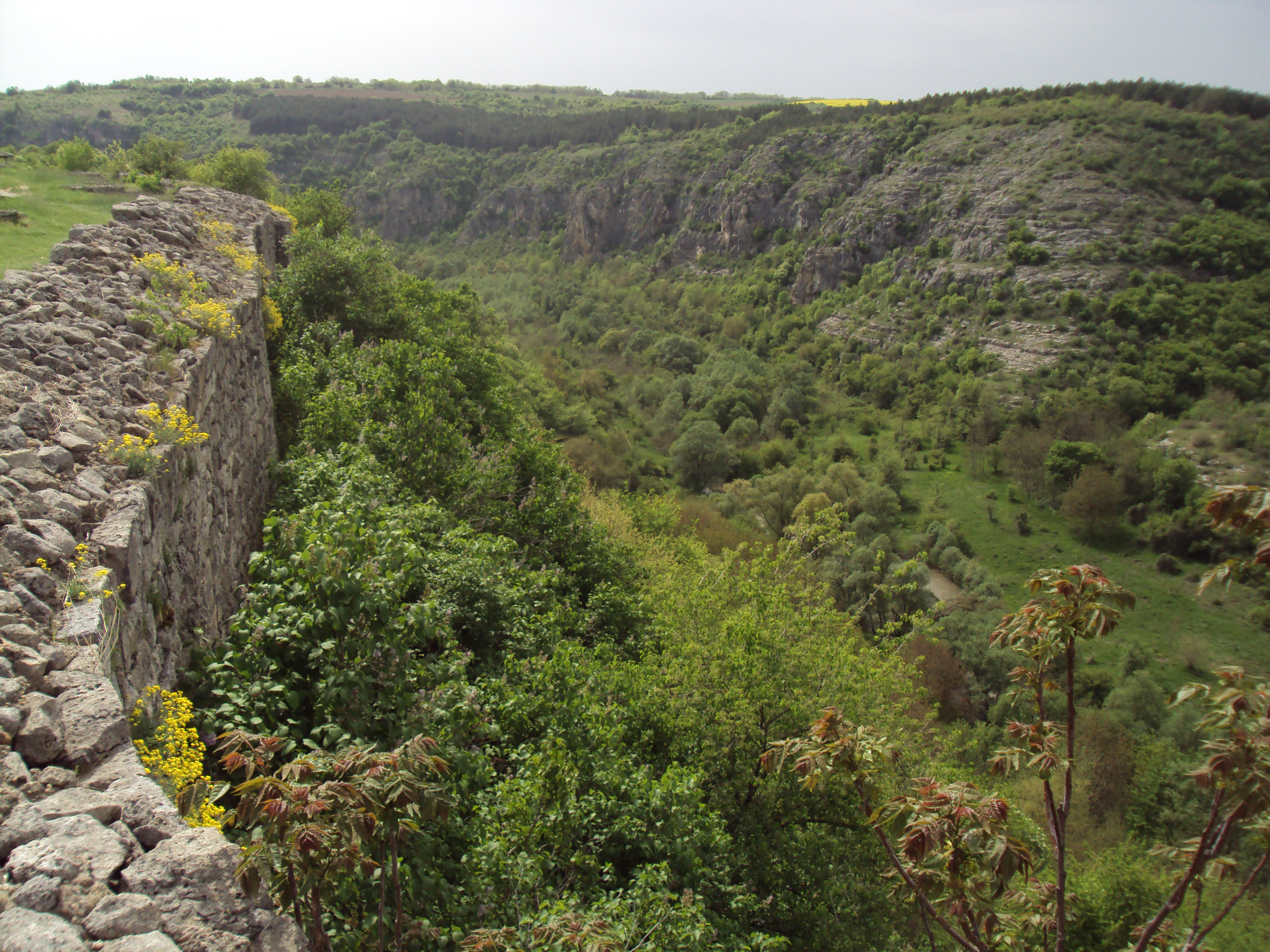
The canyon of the Cherni Lom

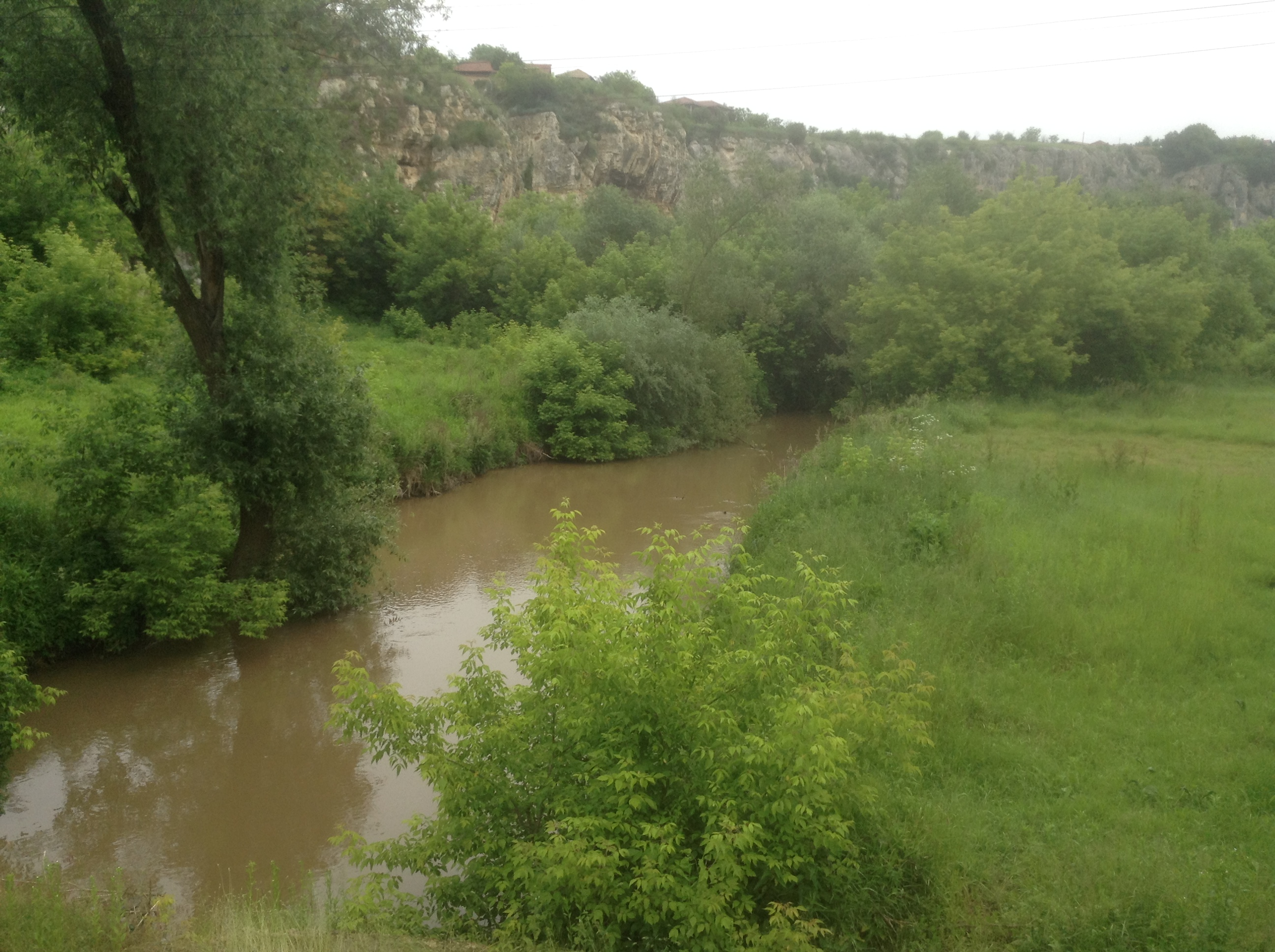
The Cherni Lom at Cherven
