= Cherven =

Cherven may refer to:

- Cherven (fortress), a medieval fortress of the Second Bulgarian Empire
- Cherven, Ruse Province, Bulgaria
- Cherven Cities, a Polish-Ukrainian borderland, associated with Red Ruthenia
- Cherven Peak, Antarctica
- Chervyen, a city in Belarus sometimes transliterated as Cherven
- Червень (cherven'), month June in Ukrainian

== See also ==
- Czerwień, a West Slavic settlement located near the site of modern Czermno, Poland
