= Baniski Lom =

Location
- Country: Bulgaria

Physical characteristics
- Source
  - location: Draganovo Heights
  - coordinates: 43°15′11.16″N 25°48′34.92″E
  - elevation: 312 m (1,024 ft)
- Mouth
  - location: Cherni Lom
  - coordinates: 43°33′6.12″N 25°56′39.84″E
  - elevation: 97 m (318 ft)
- Length: 57 km (35 mi)
- Basin size: 581 km^{2} (224 sq mi)

Basin features
- Progression: Cherni Lom→ Rusenski Lom→ Danube→ Black Sea

The Baniski Lom (Bulgarian: Баниски Лом) is a 57 km-long river in northern Bulgaria, a left tributary of the river Cherni Lom, itself a right tributary of the Rusenski Lom of the Danube basin. It is the largest tributary of the Cherni Lom.

The Baniski Lom takes its source from a spring at an altitude of 312 m in the Draganovo Heights of the Danubian Plain, near the southwestern outskirts of the village of Sushitsa. It flows in a wide valley until the village of Koprivets, at first eastwards and then north–northeast. After receiving its largest tributary the Kayadzhik, the river enters a wide canyon-like valley until it flows into the Cherni Lom at an altitude of 97 m at the village of Shirokovo.

Its drainage basin covers a territory of 581 km^{2} or 45.5% of the Cherni Lom's total. The Baniski Lom has a rain–snow feed with high water in March–June and low water in July–October. The average annual discharge at its mouth is 1.58 m^{3}/s.

The river flows in Veliko Tarnovo and Ruse Provinces. There are eight villages along its course, Sushitsa, Gorski Senovets and Gorski Senovets in Strazhitsa Municipality of Veliko Tarnovo Province, and Dryanovets and Koprivets in Byala Municipality, as well as Baniska, Chilnov and Shirokovo in Dve Mogili Municipality. Its waters are utilized for irrigation.
