= Ivanovo Municipality =

Ivanovo Municipality Община Иваново
- Municipality
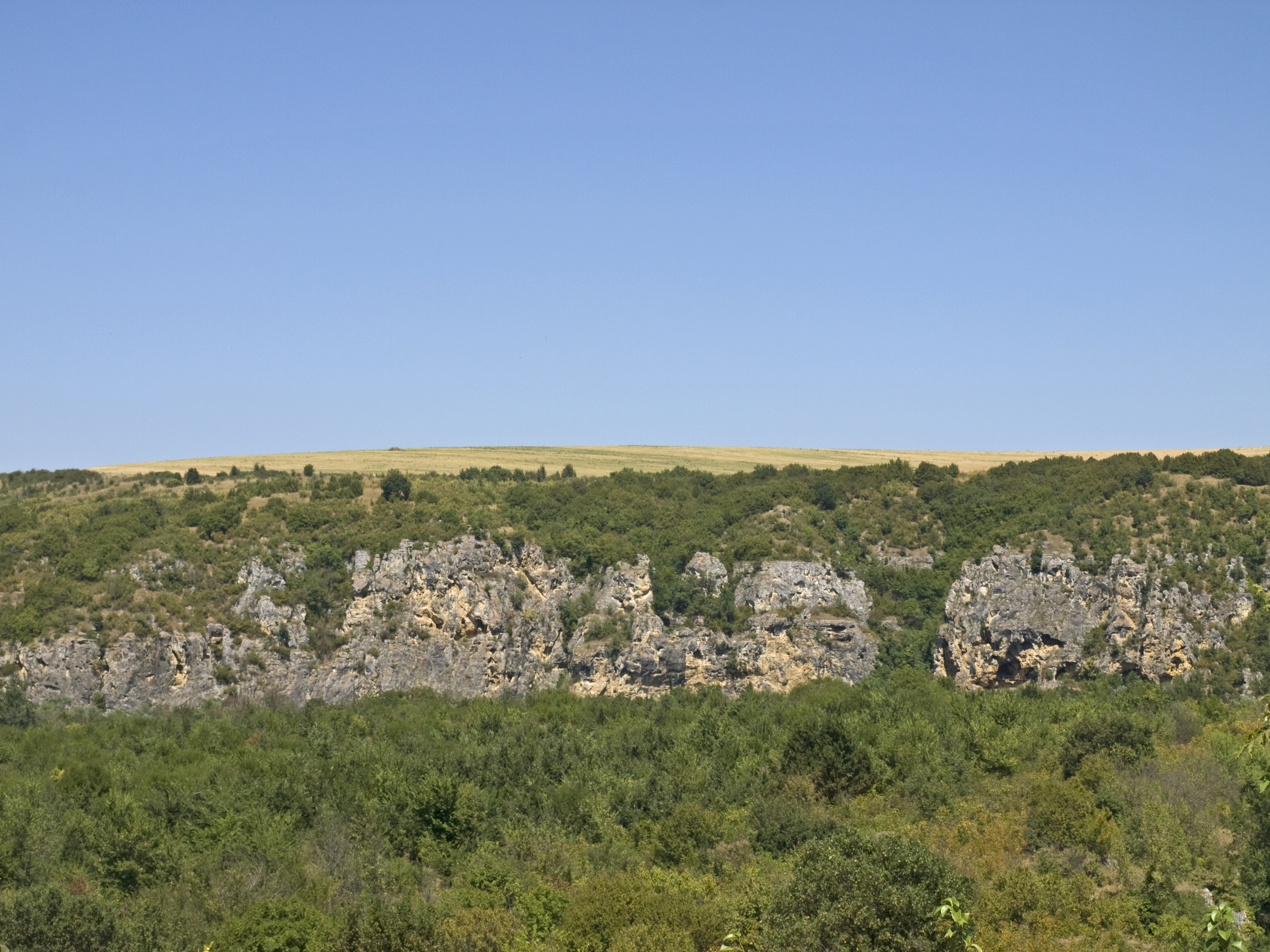
- Rocks in Rusenski Lom Nature Park

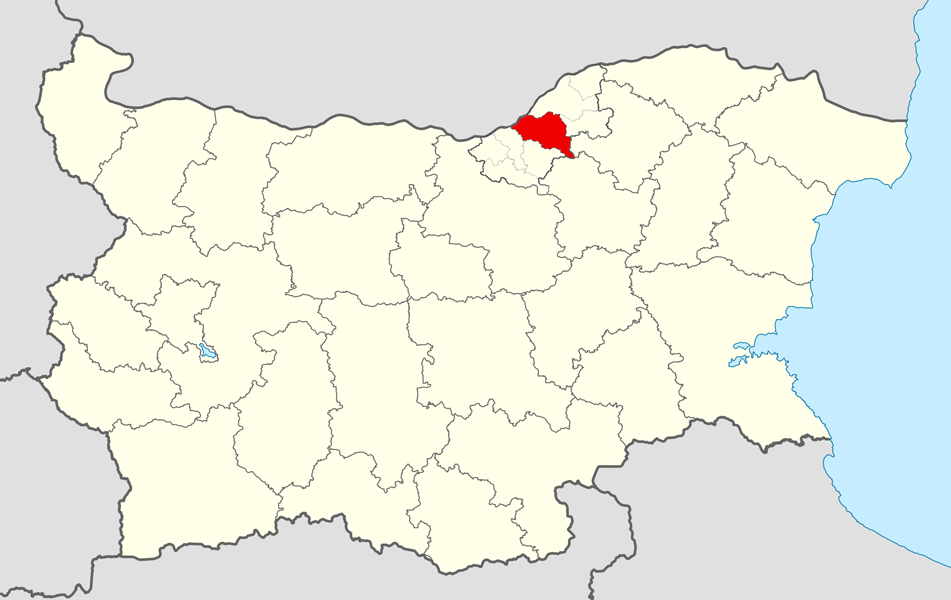
- Ivanovo Municipality within Bulgaria and Ruse Province.
- Coordinates: 43°41′N 25°57′E
- Country: Bulgaria
- Province (Oblast): Ruse
- Admin. centre (Obshtinski tsentar): Ivanovo

Area
  - Total: 495.45 km^{2} (191.29 sq mi)

Population (December 2009)
  - Total: 10,339
  - Density: 20.868/km^{2} (54.048/sq mi)
- Time zone: UTC+2 (EET)
  - Summer (DST): UTC+3 (EEST)

Ivanovo Municipality (Bulgarian: Община Иваново) is a municipality (obshtina) in Ruse Province, Central-North Bulgaria, located along the right bank of Danube river in the Danubian Plain. It is named after its administrative centre - the village of Ivanovo.

The municipality covers a territory of 495.45 km^{2} (191.29 sq mi) with a population of 10,339 inhabitants, as of December 2009.

The area is best known with the Rock-hewn Churches of Ivanovo which is an UNESCO World Heritage Site. Other important sights in the municipality include the medieval Bulgarian fortress of Cherven, which reached its apogee in the 13th and 14th centuries and features a well-preserved keep from the 14th century, and the Rusenski Lom Nature Park.

The population is predominantly Bulgarian (83.5%), with Turkish (9.4%), Romani (5.9%) and other minorities (1.2%, mostly Tatars in the village of Trastenik).

The main road E85 crosses the area from south to north, connecting the province centre of Ruse with the cities of Veliko Tarnovo and respectively Pleven and Sofia.

== Settlements ==
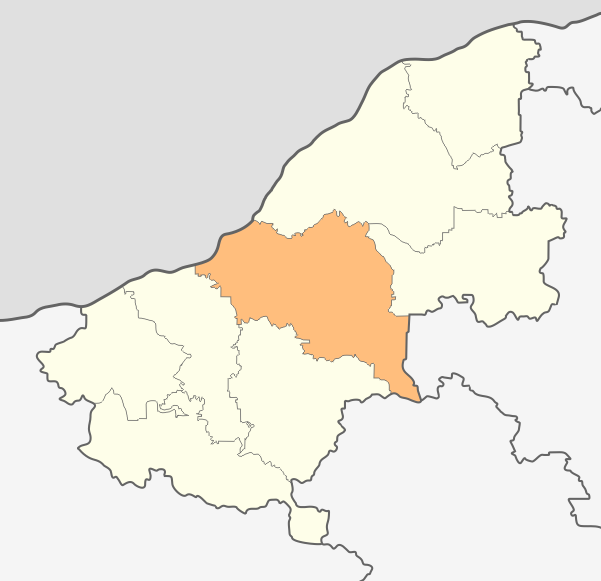

Ivanovo Municipality within Ruse Province

Ivanovo Municipality includes the following 13 places (towns are shown in bold):

Town/Village	Cyrillic	Population (December 2009)
Ivanovo	Иваново	912
Bozhichen	Божичен	175
Cherven	Червен	283
Koshov	Кошов	356
Krasen	Красен	738
Mechka	Мечка	690
Nisovo	Нисово	129
Pirgovo	Пиргово	1,949
Svalenik	Сваленик	975
Shtraklevo	Щръклево	2,510
Tabachka	Табачка	132
Trastenik	Тръстениик	1,362
Tserovets	Церовец	128
Total		10,339

== Demography ==
The following table shows the change of the population during the last four decades. Since 1992 Ivanovo Municipality has comprised the former municipality of Shtraklevo and the numbers in the table reflect this unification.

Ivanovo Municipality
**Year**	1975	1985	1992	**2001**	2005	2007	2009	**2011**
**Population**	11,994	9,872	14,801	11,092	11,229	10,919	10,339	...
Sources: Census 2001, Census 2011, „pop-stat.mashke.org“,

=== Religion ===
According to the latest Bulgarian census of 2011, the religious composition, among those who answered the optional question on religious identification, was the following:

Religious composition of Ivanovo Municipality
Orthodox Christianity	73.9%
Catholicism	0.6%
Protestantism	0.5%
Islam	16.2%
No religion	2.6%
Prefer not to answer, others and indefinable	6.2%

== See also ==
- Provinces of Bulgaria
- Municipalities of Bulgaria
- List of cities and towns in Bulgaria
