= Shtraklevo =

Shtraklevo Щръклево
- Village
- Location in Bulgaria
- Coordinates: 43.717°N 26.05°E
- Country: Bulgaria
- Province: Rousse
- Municipality: Ivanovo

Government
  - Mayor: Tsvetelina Mihaylova (GERB)

Area
  - Total: 86.652 km^{2} (33.457 sq mi)
- Elevation: 172.3 m (565 ft)

Population (2015)
  - Total: 2,546
- Postal code: 7078
- Area code: 08111
- Vehicle registration: Р

Shtraklevo (Bulgarian: Щръклево) is a village in northern Bulgaria. It is located in municipality of Ivanovo in Rousse.

== Geography ==
Shtraklevo is located 17 kilometres (11 mi) south of Rousse. Rousse Airport is located approximately 1 kilometer from the village.

== History ==
In the past, the village was called Kadıköy (Bulgarian: Кадикьой), or the headquarters of the judge, the 'kadı'. Its current name was created after the liberation of Bulgaria.

There are many different tales of how the village got its name. The most famous states that many cranes made their nests in the vicinity.

Another version of the tale goes that there was a small forest, where every day during the summer, the cranes hid from insects.

In the vicinity of the village, on the bank of the river Beli Lom between North Pisanets and North Nisovo, remnants of the old village "Galitsa" can be found. According to some older villagers, this is an old village founded during the time of the Plague.

Close to the village one may find fragments of clay containers, which serve as a proof that the area was populated in Roman times.
