= Battle of Ivanovo Chiflik =

- Part of Russo-Turkish War (1877–1878)
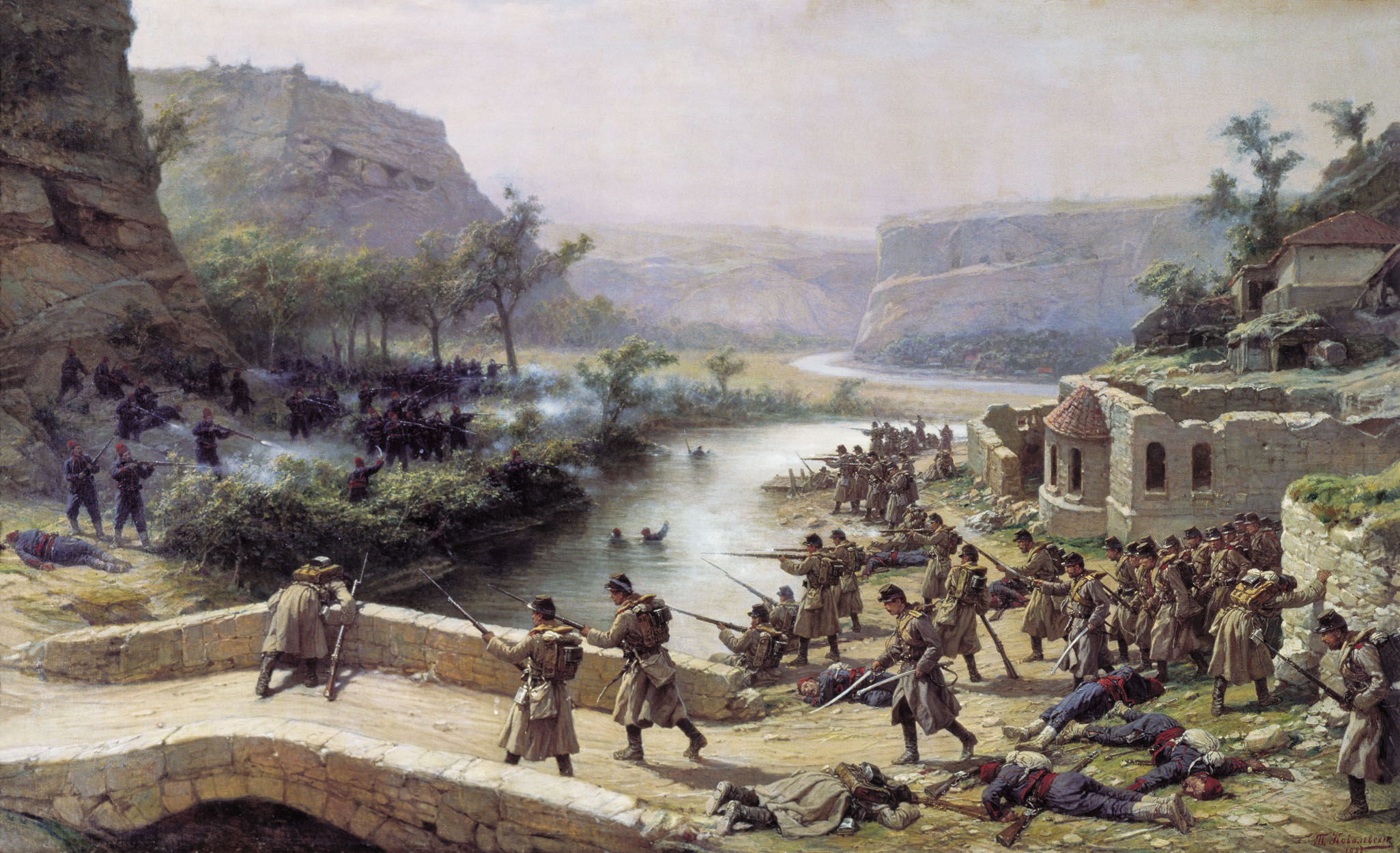
- Fight near Ivanovo Chiflik
Date	24 October 1877
Location	Ivanovo, Ottoman Empire; Present-day Bulgaria
Result	Ottoman victory

Belligerents
Ottoman Empire	Russian Empire

Commanders and leaders
Unknown	(Russian Empire) Duke Romanovsky † (Russian Empire) Gen. Andrey Kosich (Russian Empire) Dmitry Grigoryev (Russian Empire) Ivan Venediktov (Russian Empire) Lt. Col. Zander

The Battle of Ivanovo Chiflik was a conflict that took place between the Ottoman Empire and the Russian Empire in the village of Ivanovo on 24 October 1877 during the Russo-Turkish War (1877–1878)

== Background ==
On August 25, 1877, the Russians were forced to abandon the village of Ivanovo as a result of Operation Kara Lom. On October 24, both sides sent reconnaissance detachments along the Kara Lom River. The Russians aimed to force the Ottomans to reveal the number of troops on the riverbank without resorting to combat. The Russian force was headed by Sergey Maximilianovich Romanovsky, a member of the House of Romanov. Among the officers accompanying him were Dmitry Petrovich Grigoryev, Ivan Ivanovich Venediktov, Lieutenant Colonel Zander, and others. The Duke commanded the Kherson Regiment, twelve guns, and Cossack units.

== Battle ==
When the Duke was approaching Ivanovo, he heard gunfire in the distance. General Andrey Ivanovich Kosich was fighting against Ottoman troops. Lieutenant Colonel Zander advised the Duke not to advance further and to stop at a suitable spot to observe the Ottoman soldiers who were beginning to appear from behind the neighboring hills. Climbing a hill near the fighting, the Duke lit a cigarette and asked for his binoculars. The moment he raised the binoculars, he was shot in the forehead. Lieutenant Colonel Zander, with the help of the Cossacks, placed the Duke’s body on a stretcher and transported it by carriage to Brestovets. His body was taken by rail from Petroșani to Saint Petersburg. The Russian counter-offensive, launched in retaliation for the killing of the Duke, was repelled.

== Source ==
- Venediktov, I. I. (August 1903). "В Рущукском отряде. Воспоминания И. И. Венедиктова" [In the Rushchuk Detachment. Memoirs of I. I. Venediktov]. Русская старина [Russkaya Starina] (in Russian).
- Çalhan, Özden; Keskin, Alev (2004). 1877-1878 Osmanlı-Rus Savaşı Zaman Dizini [Chronology of the 1877–1878 Ottoman-Russian War] (in Turkish). Ankara: Genelkurmay Basımevi. p. 71.
