= Byala Municipality, Ruse Province =

Byala Municipality Община Бяла
- Municipality
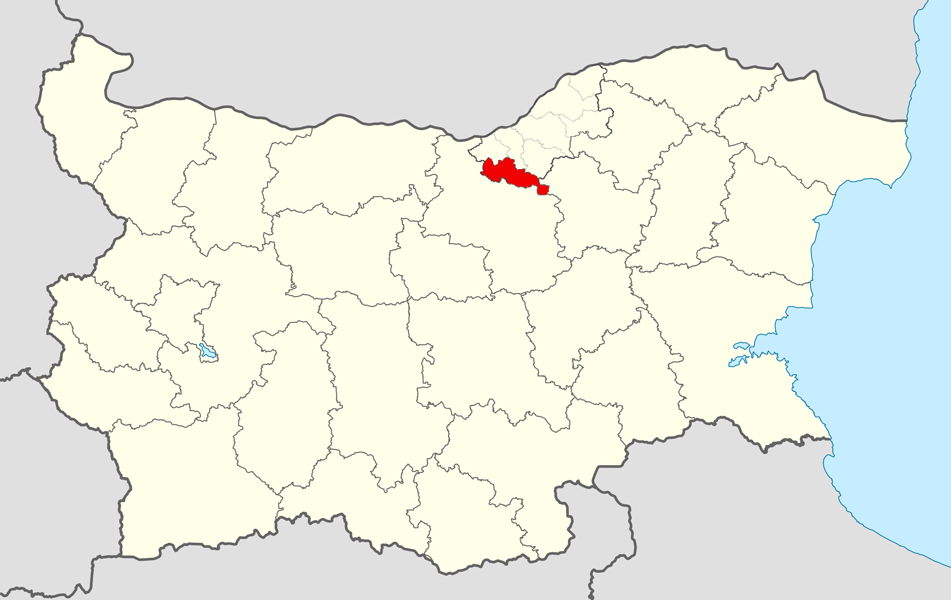
- Byala Municipality within Bulgaria and Ruse Province.
- Coordinates: 43°26′N 25°43′E
- Country: Bulgaria
- Province (Oblast): Ruse
- Admin. centre (Obshtinski tsentar): Byala

Area
  - Total: 341 km^{2} (132 sq mi)

Population (December 2009)
  - Total: 14,962
  - Density: 43.9/km^{2} (114/sq mi)
- Time zone: UTC+2 (EET)
  - Summer (DST): UTC+3 (EEST)

Byala Municipality (Bulgarian: Община Бяла) is a municipality (obshtina) in Ruse Province, Central-North Bulgaria, located in the Danubian Plain about 20 km southeast of Danube river. It is named after its administrative centre - the town of Byala.

The municipality embraces a territory of 341 km^{2} (132 sq mi) with a population of 14,962 inhabitants, as of December 2009.

The area is crossroads of some of the main directions in the country - road E85, road E83, I-51 and I-52, which connect the province centre of Ruse with the cities of Veliko Tarnovo, Pleven, Svishtov and respectively the country capital of Sofia and Shipka pass. Yantra river flows through the area from south to north.

== Settlements ==
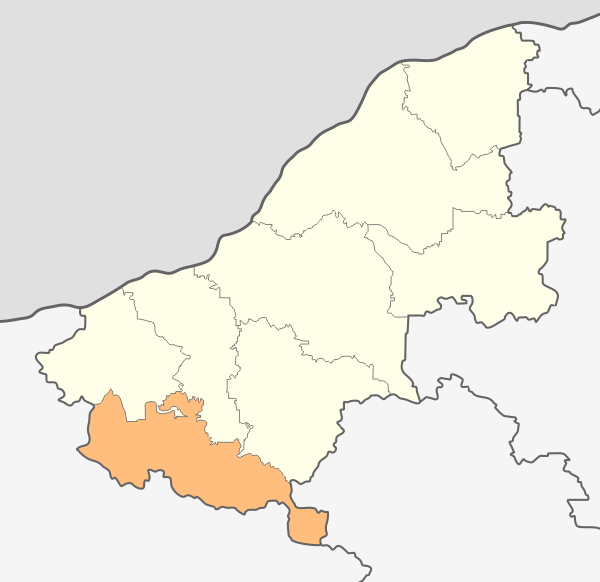
Byala Municipality within Ruse Province

Byala Municipality includes the following 11 places (towns are shown in bold):

Town/Village	Cyrillic	Population (December 2009)
**Byala**	**Бяла**	9,015
Bistrentsi	Бистренци	395
Bosilkovtsi	Босилковци	669
Botrov	Ботров	319
Dryanovets	Дряновец	748
Koprivets	Копривец	884
Lom Cherkovna	Лом Черковна	462
Pet Kladentsi	Пет кладенци	64
Peychinovo	Пейчиново	343
Polsko Kosovo	Полско Косово	1,686
Starmen	Стърмен	377
Total		14,962

== Demography ==
The following table shows the change of the population during the last four decades.

Byala Municipality
**Year**	1975	1985	1992	**2001**	2005	2007	2009	**2011**
**Population**	21,655	20,261	19,348	17,004	16,040	15,533	14,962	...
Sources: Census 2001, Census 2011, „pop-stat.mashke.org“,

=== Religion ===
According to the latest Bulgarian census of 2011, the religious composition, among those who answered the optional question on religious identification, was the following:

Religious composition of Byala Municipality
Orthodox Christianity	68.1%
Catholicism	0.4%
Protestantism	0.4%
Islam	5.7%
No religion	8.5%
Prefer not to answer, others and indefinable	16.9%

== See also ==
- Provinces of Bulgaria
- Municipalities of Bulgaria
- List of cities and towns in Bulgaria
