= Ruse Airport =

Ruse Airport Летище Русе
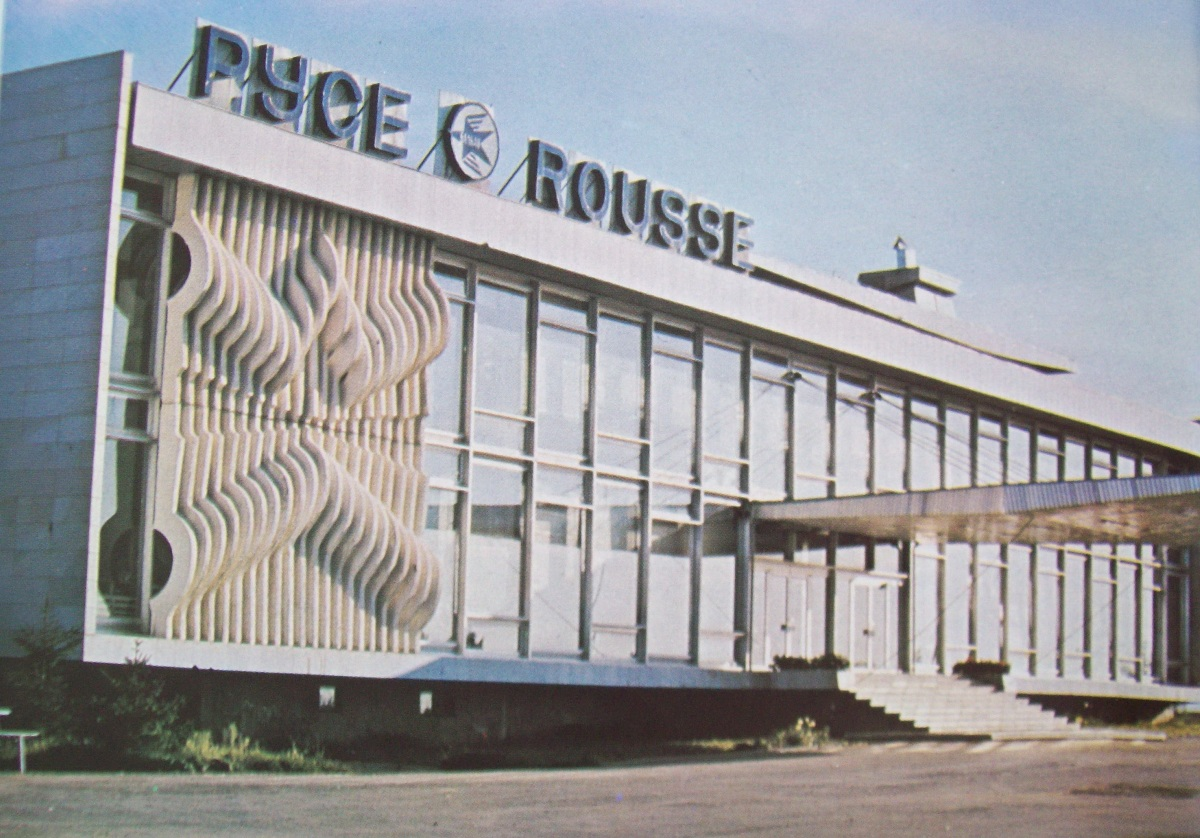
- Main building of Ruse Airport
- IATA: ROU; ICAO: LBRS

Summary
- Airport type: Public
- Owner: Ruse Municipality
- Operator: Ruse Airport JSC
- Serves: Ruse
- Location: Shtraklevo, Bulgaria
- Opened: 1967
- Time zone: EET (UTC+2)
  - Summer (DST): EEST (UTC+3)
- Elevation AMSL: 175 m (574 ft)
- Coordinates: 43°41′42″N 026°03′25″E
- Website: www.lbrs.bg/en/index.php

Map
- Location within Bulgaria

Runways
Direction	Length		Surface
Direction	m	ft	Surface
07/25	2,500	8,202	Concrete

Ruse Airport (IATA: ROU, ICAO: LBRS) (Bulgarian: Летище Русе, romanized: Letishte Ruse), also known as Shtraklevo (Щръклево) after the village located to the north, is a general aviation airport located about 20 km south of the city of Ruse, Bulgaria. Ruse Airport is the only Bulgarian airport licensed for general purpose aviation but not licensed for international or domestic passenger services. Currently, the airport is used by private jets and hosts three hail-prevention airplanes used for anti-hail protection of Bulgaria and Southern Romania.

== History ==
The airport was established in 1967 as a training site for pilots from the Bulgarian Air Force. The airport was named 11th Air Base "Shtraklevo" and equipped with Aero L-29 Delfin coming from Dolna Mitropoliya Airport. It was used by Balkan Bulgarian Airlines for its domestic flights to Sofia Airport, but with the end of the communist era in Bulgaria, domestic flights weren't profitable, due to lack of government funding. It served as a training base until 1998, when it ceased military operations and was finally abandoned in 1999.

In 2021, GullivAir expressed interest in starting regular domestic flights to and from Sofia Airport using ATR 72-600 aircraft with a capacity of 70 seats.

Research was done regarding passenger demand and the feasibility of opening this route, and it was concluded that 98% of travellers between Ruse and Sofia would benefit from a regular flight service as it would be way faster and more convenient than road or rail transport.

About 2.6 million BGN (about 1.3 million EUR) were planned to be allocated by the Government of Bulgaria to do the required infrastructure investments needed to operate commercial flights, including repair of the runway, a new perimeter fence, a security system and the training of staff, and other costs.

The goal was for flights to start in May 2022, but plans never finalized and GullivAir retired its small fleet of ATR 72 aircraft shortly after, due to low passenger numbers and not enough profits, shifting its focus on ACMI wet-leasing services to other airlines.

A new bus line from Ruse to the airport would have opened if commercial flights had actually started, and Ruse Municipality had planned to undergo renovations on the abandoned terminal of the airport, while keeping its historic authenticity.

== Development ==
The government of Bulgaria decided to grant concession of some of its international airports, but the first procedure in late 2007 wasn't successful, although there was interest from the Swiss investor Ferdinand Prisi and the Bulgarian company Prista Oil. The government decided to make a new bid for the airport of Ruse, that a new concourse should take place in mid-December 2007, but later postponed it to an unknown date.

In mid-October 2014, the Ministry of Transport decided to grant the ownership of the airport to Ruse Municipality. The idea was approved by the municipality Councilors and the finalization of the deal was expected to occur in early November 2014. The airport's manager, Nikolay Gorchev, stated in an interview that when the deal was completed, an application for license for aviation activities would be made.

The Bulgarian government transferred ownership of the property in Shtraklevo village, as well as its stake in the airport to Ruse municipality on 17 December 2014. The procedure was finalized on 4 February 2015 and the airport is currently officially owned by Ruse municipality. From 2017, the airport is open for small passenger and cargo aircraft. On February 24, 2023, the Municipal Council of Ruse voted for the company " Ruse Airport " to enter into a contract for the operation of the airport located in the village of Shtrklevo.

Since then, significant steps have been taken to modernize the airport and improve the conditions for providing aviation services. The runway lighting system was built. Thus, the airport in Ruse is the first in Bulgaria with LED lighting with solar batteries. A 9-kilometer perimeter fence was also built. The grounds have been thoroughly cleaned and the passenger terminal building has been renovated and preserved.

Two anemometers are also installed, which meet the special requirements of the International Civil Aviation Organization ICAO.

For the needs of the airport, stationary and mobile fuel tanks were bought last year, as well as a "Follow me" vehicle.

== Airlines and destinations ==
There are currently no services to and from Ruse Airport. The airport hosts three Beechcraft King Air anti-hail airplanes and often receives private jets.

=== Former airlines and destinations ===
Airlines	Destinations
Balkan Bulgarian Airlines	Sofia

== See also ==
- List of Bulgarian Air Force bases
- List of Bulgarian military bases
- 28th Air Detachment
- Bulgaria
- Military of Bulgaria
- The Bulgarian Cosmonauts
- List of joint US-Bulgarian military bases
