= Koprivets =

Settlement in Bulgaria

Koprivets Копривец
- Location of Koprivets
- Coordinates: 43°24.28′N 25°53.48′E
- Country: Bulgaria

Area
  - Total: 47.161 km^{2} (18.209 sq mi)
- Elevation: 164 m (538 ft)

Population (2021)
  - Total: 685
- Time zone: UTC+2 (EET)
  - Summer (DST): UTC+3 (EEST)
- Postal code: 7120
- Area code: 08125

Koprivets (Bulgarian: Копривец) is a village in northern Bulgaria, administered by the municipality of Byala and part of Ruse Province. It lies 50 km south of Ruse and 16 km east of Byala.

== Geography ==
The village is on the left bank of the Baniski Lom river which joins with the Cherni Lom and Beli Lom rivers to produce the Rusenski Lom which flows into the River Danube near Ruse. Koprivets is next to the Popovski Hills (220– 296 m above sea level) in the Ludogorie hilly plateau region, part of the Danubian Plain.

The distance from the Bulgarian capital, Sofia, is 270 km.

The surrounding countryside are a mosaic of farmland, forests and natural vegetation, which is quite sparsely populated with 34 inhabitants’ per square kilometre. The area is in the Köppen climate classification category Dfa = Hot-summer humid continental climate. The average annual temperature in the area 13 °C. The warmest month is August when the average temperature is 33 °C and the coldest is January with −3 °C. The average rainfall is 34 millimeter per month. The wettest month is June, with an average 55 mm precipitation, and the driest months is August, with 17 mm rainfall. There are 277 days with no rain.

== History ==
Near the village Cemetery there was an open settlement from the early Neolithic period. Thracian ceramics were located in the village, as well as a Thracian settlement and tombstones from the 5th – 3rd century BCE. There are remains of an early Byzantine fortress, built during the time of Emperor Justinian. The remains of the fortress have suffered significantly. The village was also inhabited during the First Bulgarian Empire, the Second Bulgarian Empire and the Ottoman Empire.

== Cultural and natural attractions ==
The biggest cultural landmark is the Monastery of St Petka.
