= Cherven, Ruse Province =

Village in Bulgaria

Cherven Червен
- Village
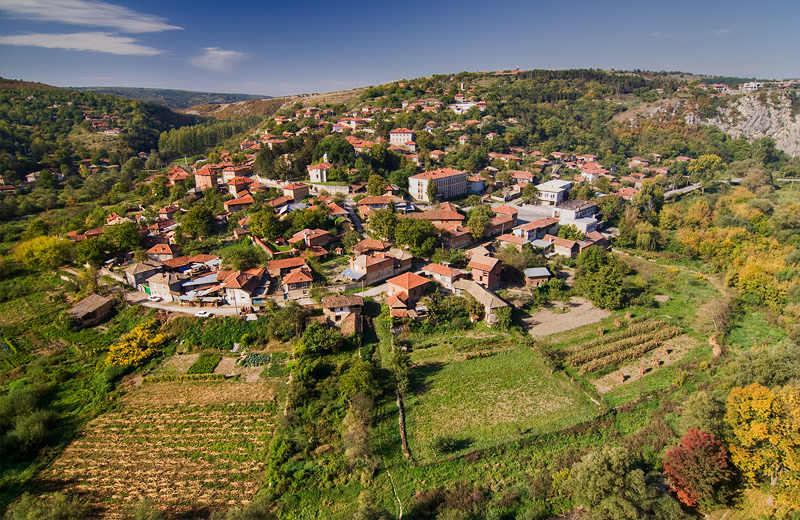

- Location within Bulgaria
- Coordinates: 43°37′00″N 26°02′00″E
- Country: Bulgaria
- Province: Ruse
- Municipality: Ivanovo

Population (2011)
  - Total: 239

Cherven (Bulgarian: Червен) is a village in northeastern Bulgaria in the Ruse Province. Cherven is situated in the municipality of Ivanovo. As of 2011, the village had 239 inhabitants. The tributary of the river Rusenski Lom, the Cherni Lom (meaning Black Lom), divides the village into two parts.

One of the most important towns in the Second Bulgarian Empire existed near the village and was also called Cherven. During its heyday between 12th and 14th centuries, it was one of the largest commercial and military centres in the region. It was fully destroyed after the Bulgarian–Ottoman Wars and is now in ruins.
