= Cherven (fortress) =

Coordinates: 43°37′14.63″N 26°1′3.51″E

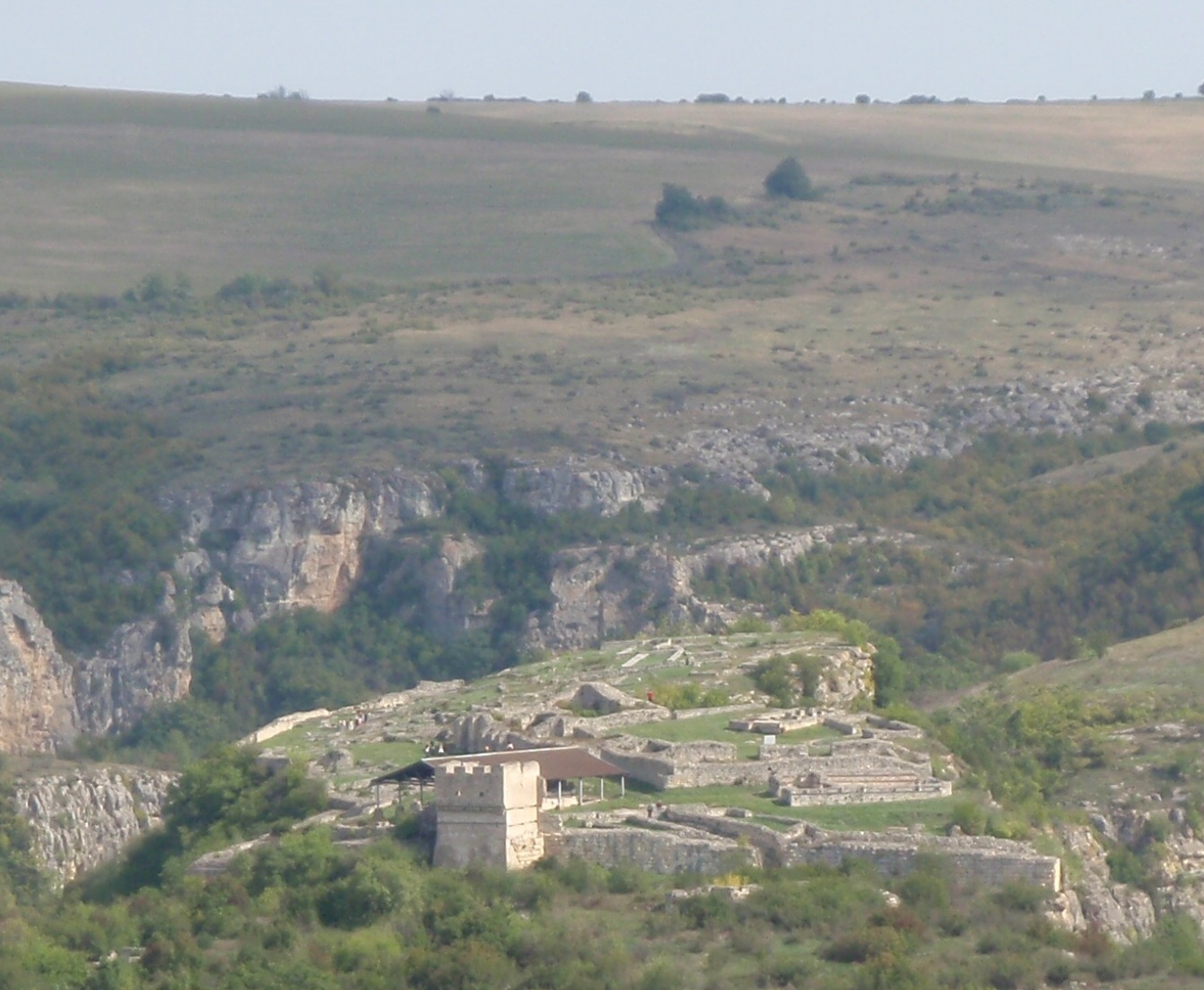
Cherven medieval fortress

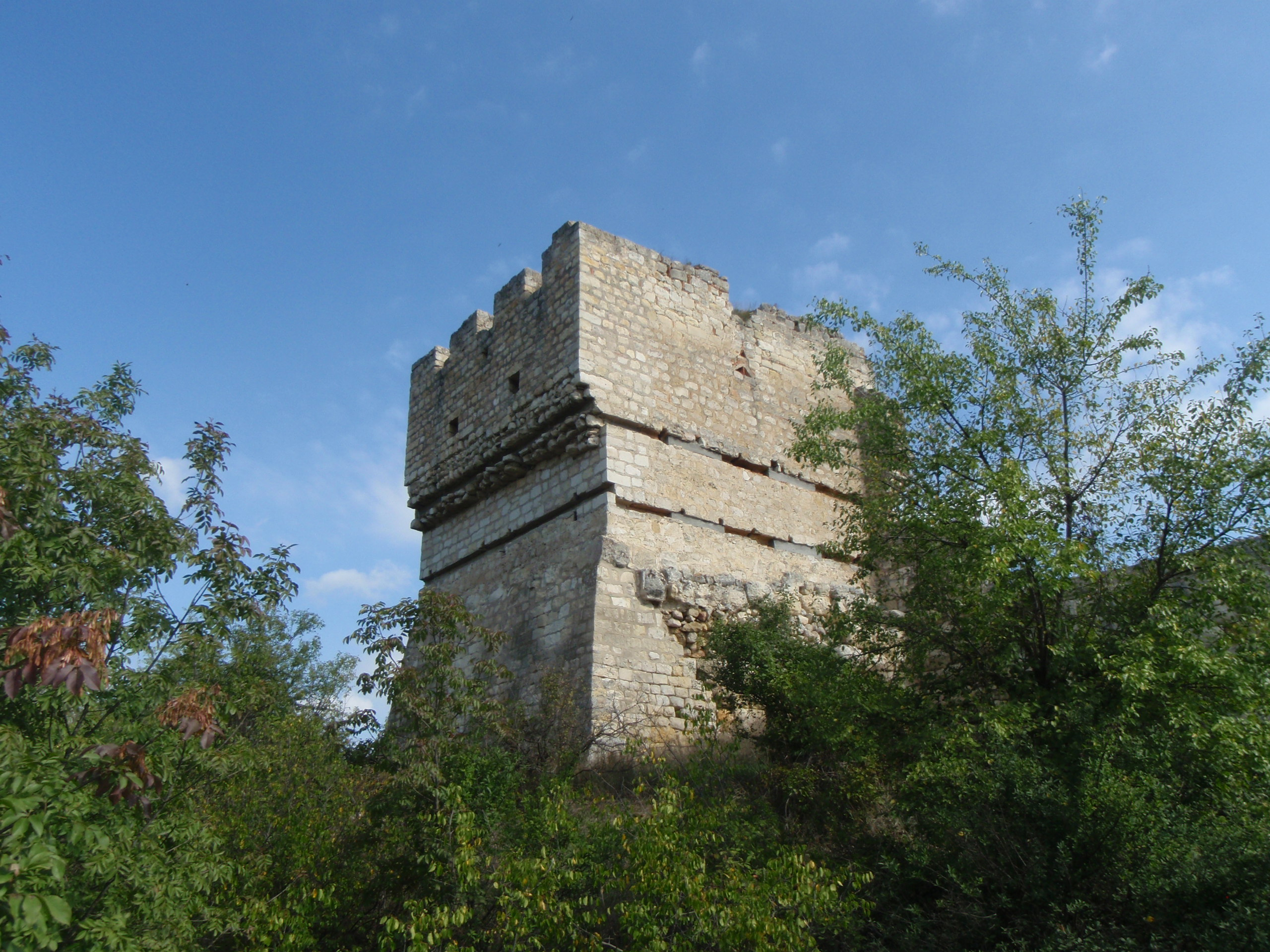
The best-preserved Cherven tower

The stronghold of Cherven (Bulgarian: Червен, "red") was one of the Second Bulgarian Empire's primary military, administrative, economic and cultural centres between the 12th and the 14th century. The ruins of the fortress are located near the village of the same name 30 to 35 kilometres (19 to 22 mi) south of Rousse, northeastern Bulgaria.

== History ==
The town was a successor to an earlier Byzantine fortress of the 6th century, but the area has been inhabited since the arrival of the Thracians. Cherven was first mentioned in the 11th century in an Old Bulgarian apocryphal chronicle. It gained importance after 1235, when it became the seat of the medieval Bulgarian Orthodox Bishopric of Cherven. It was affected by the Mongol Golden Horde raids in 1242 and was briefly conquered by Byzantine troops during the reign of Tsar Ivailo (1278–1280).

During the second half of the 14th century, the stronghold's area exceeded 1 square kilometre (0.39 sq mi) and had intensive urban development, including a fortified inner city on vast rock ground in one of the Cherni Lom river's bends, and an outer city at the foot of the rocks and on the neighbouring hills. The town had a complex fortification system and was completely built up. Cherven grew to become a centre of craftsmanship in the 14th century, with iron extraction, ironworking, goldsmithing, construction and arts being well developed. The town was an important junction of roads from the Danube to the country's interior, which also made the town a key centre of trade.

Cherven was conquered by the Ottoman Turks in 1388 during the Bulgarian-Ottoman Wars, initially retaining its administrative functions but later declining in importance. The modern village of Cherven located close to the ruins of the fortress has, as of September 2005, 302 inhabitants.

== Archaeological site ==
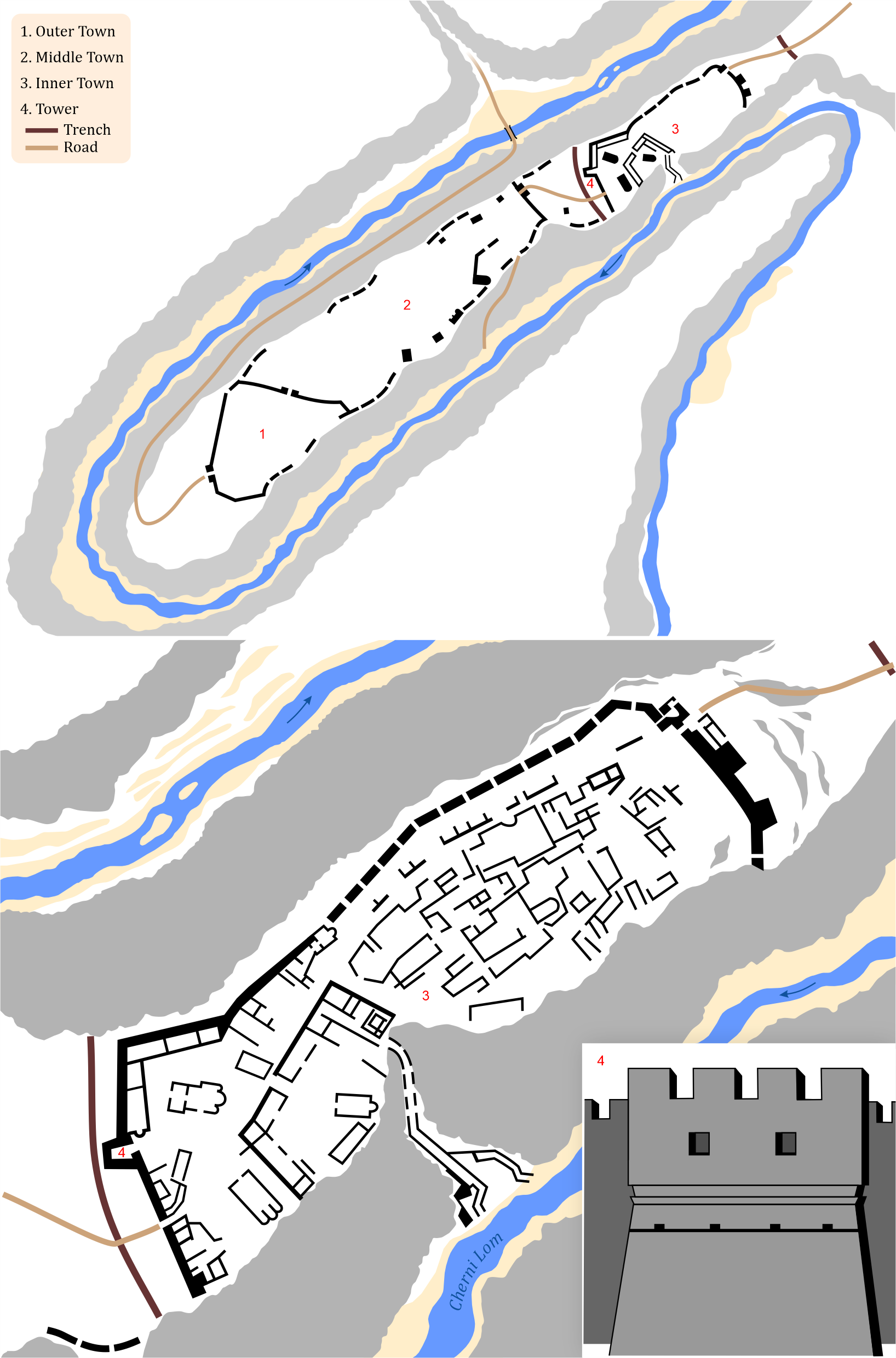
Plan of the fortress Cherven

The remains of the medieval town of Cherven are an archaeological site of great importance to the research of Bulgarian culture of the Middle Ages. The first excavations were carried out in 1910–1911 under professor Vasil Zlatarski, while regular research on the site began in 1961. Currently, archaeological work is being conducted by Stoyan Yordanov of the Rousse Regional Museum of History. Yordanov has over 30 years of experience working at Cherven, and leads excavations atop the Cherven old town site every summer.

A large feudal palace with fortified walls reaching up to 3 metres (10 ft) wide, two well-preserved underground water supply passages, 13 churches, administrative and residential buildings, workshops and streets have been excavated. The three-storey tower, 12 metres (39 ft) high, from the 14th century has also been fully preserved and was even used as a model for the reconstruction of Baldwin's Tower in Tsarevets, Veliko Tarnovo, in 1930. The site has been a national archaeological reserve since 1965 and is a popular tourist attraction.

A 14th-century church was discovered in Cherven with murals of "warrior saints".

== Legacy ==
Cherven Peak on Rugged Island in the South Shetland Islands, Antarctica is named after Cherven.
