= Rusenski Lom Nature Park =

Protected area in Bulgaria

- Bulgarian: Природен парк Русенски Лом
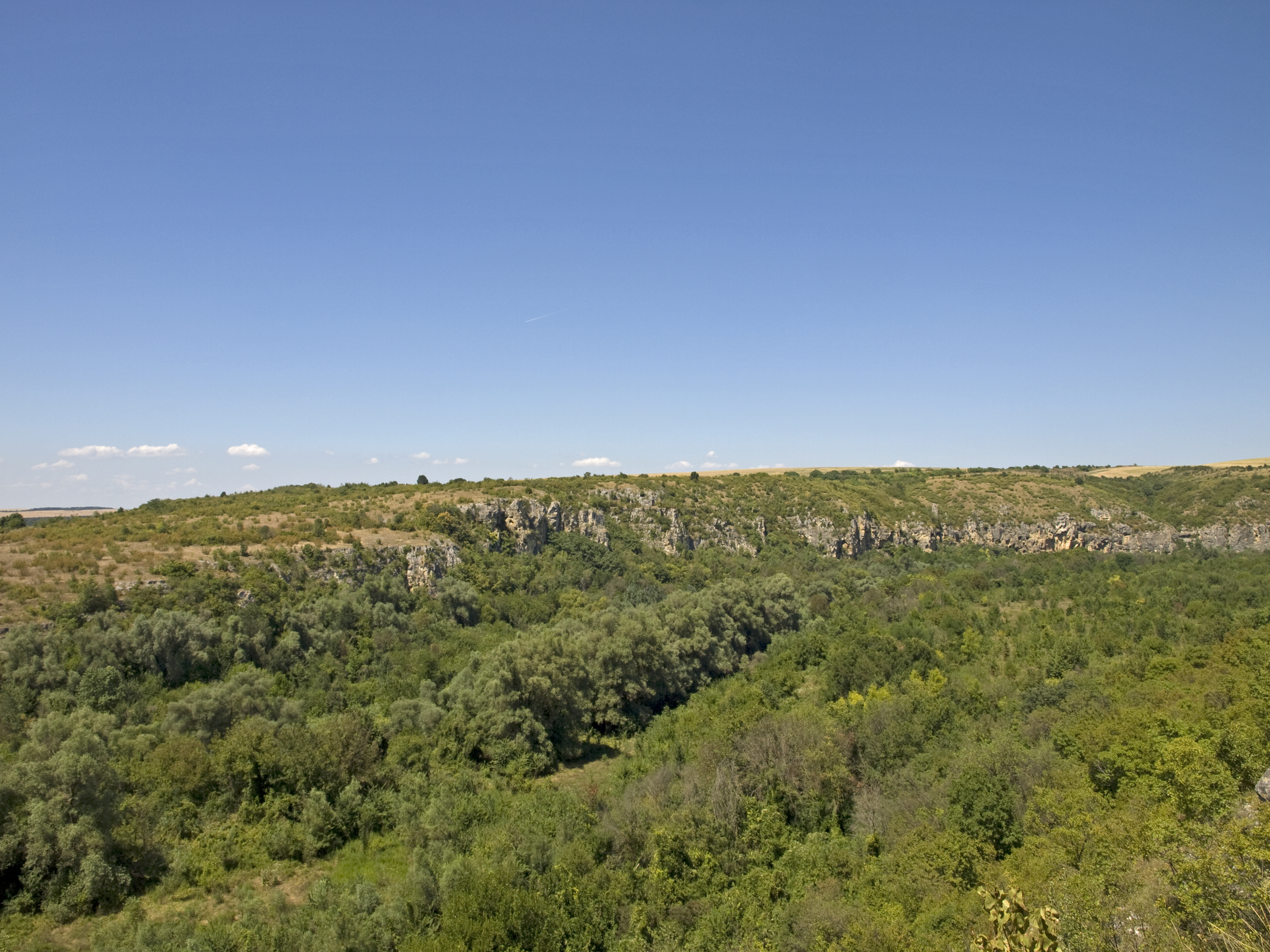
- Panorama of the Rusenski Lom canyon

- Location within Bulgaria
- Location: Ivanovo Municipality, Ruse Province, Bulgaria
- Nearest city: Ruse
- Coordinates: 43°41′45″N 26°1′43″E
- Area: 3,408 hectares (8,420 acres)
- Established: 26 February 1970
- Website: www.lomea.org

Rusenski Lom Nature Park (Bulgarian: Природен парк Русенски Лом) is a protected area in Ivanovo Municipality, Ruse Province, northern Bulgaria. The park was established on 26 February 1970, in order to protect the canyon of the Rusenski Lom, the last significant right tributary of the Danube. The park covers an area of 3,408 hectares (13.16 mi^{2}).

The area of the park was settled in the prehistory. Between the 12th and the 14th centuries, during the Second Bulgarian Empire, the area became attractive for monks and several cave monasteries were founded. As a result of this, it became a significant cultural center. After the Ottoman Empire conquered the area, they started to decay. The remains of the monasteries are now a part of the Rock-hewn Churches of Ivanovo World Heritage Site located inside the park.

The canyon is isolated, allowing for the creation of a natural environment which combines features of Mediterranean and Central European fauna and flora. Much of the area is covered by forest.

The nature park is a major tourist attraction. Major activities in the park include visiting the rock-hewn churches, rafting, and visiting caves.
