= Rock-hewn Churches of Ivanovo =

UNESCO World Heritage Site in Ruse Province, Bulgaria

Rock-Hewn Churches of Ivanovo
UNESCO World Heritage Site
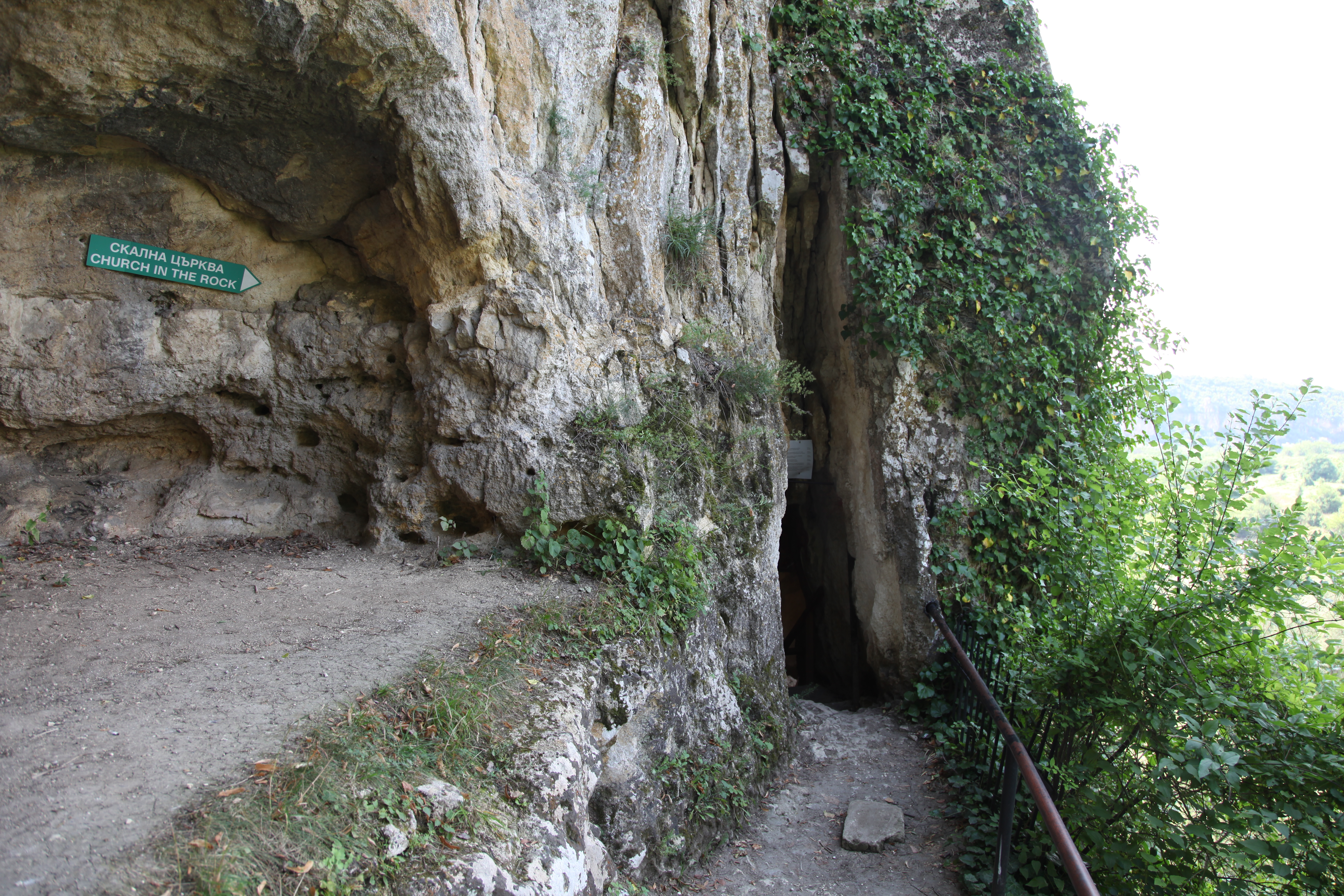

- Location within Bulgaria
- Location: Ivanovo, Ruse Province, Bulgaria
- Criteria: Cultural: (ii), (iii)
- Reference: 45
- Inscription: 1979 (3rd Session)
- Area: 171.9 ha (0.664 sq mi)
- Coordinates: 43°43′N 25°58′E

The Rock-hewn Churches of Ivanovo (Bulgarian: Ивановски скални църкви, Ivanovski skalni tsarkvi) are a group of monolithic churches, chapels and monasteries hewn out of solid rock and completely different from other monastery complexes in Bulgaria, located near the village of Ivanovo, 20 kilometers (12 mi) south of Rousse, on the high rocky banks of the Rusenski Lom, 32 meters (105 ft) above the river. The complex is noted for its beautiful and well-preserved medieval frescoes. The churches are inside Rusenski Lom Nature Park.

== History ==
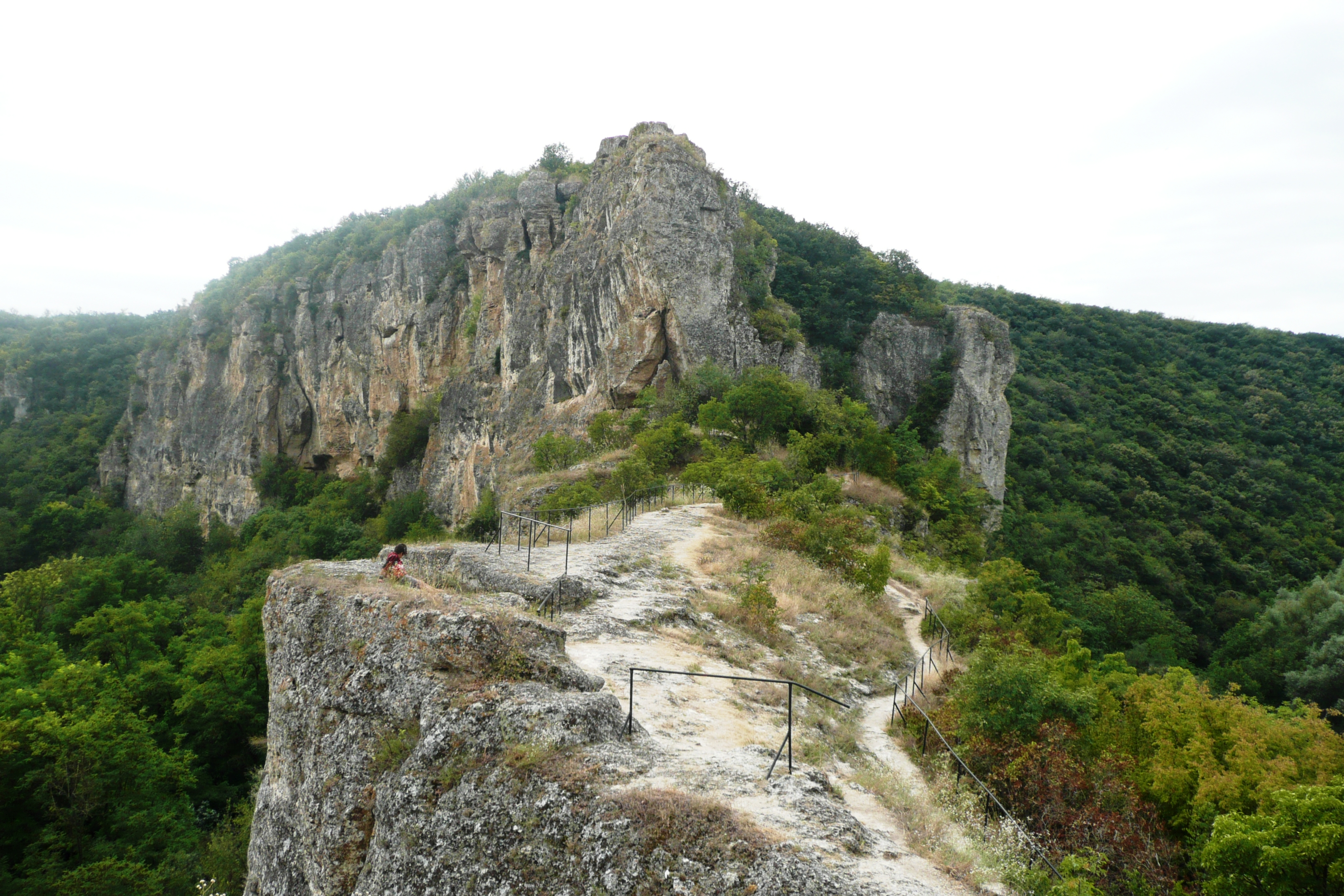
Ivanovo rocks near the church complex

The caves in the region had been inhabited by monks from the 1220s, when it was founded by the future Patriarch of Bulgaria Joachim I, to the 17th century, where they hewed cells, churches and chapels out of solid rock. At the peak of the monastery complex, the number of churches was about 40, while the other premises were around 300, most of which are not preserved today.

Second Bulgarian Empire rulers such as Ivan Alexander and Ivan Asen II frequently made donations to the complex, as evidenced by donor portraits in some of the churches. Other patrons included nobles from the capital Tarnovo and nearest big medieval town Cherven, with which the monastery complex had strong ties in the 13th and 14th century. It was a centre of hesychasm in the Bulgarian lands in the 14th century and continued to exist in the early centuries of the Ottoman rule of Bulgaria, but gradually decayed.

The Rock-hewn Churches of Ivanovo were included in the UNESCO World Heritage List in 1979.

== Preserved heritage ==
The monastery complex owes much of its fame to 13th- and 14th-century frescoes, preserved in five of the churches, which are thought of as wonderful examples of Bulgarian mediaeval art. The rock premises used by the monks include the St Archangel Michael Chapel ("The Buried Church"), the Baptistery, the Gospodev Dol Chapel, the St Theodore Church ("The Demolished Church") and the main Church, with the 14th-century murals in the latter one being arguably the most famous of all in Ivanovo and noted as some of the most representative examples of Palaeologan art.

Many century-old inscriptions have also been preserved in the monastical premises, including the famous indented inscription of the monk Ivo Gramatik from 1308–1309.

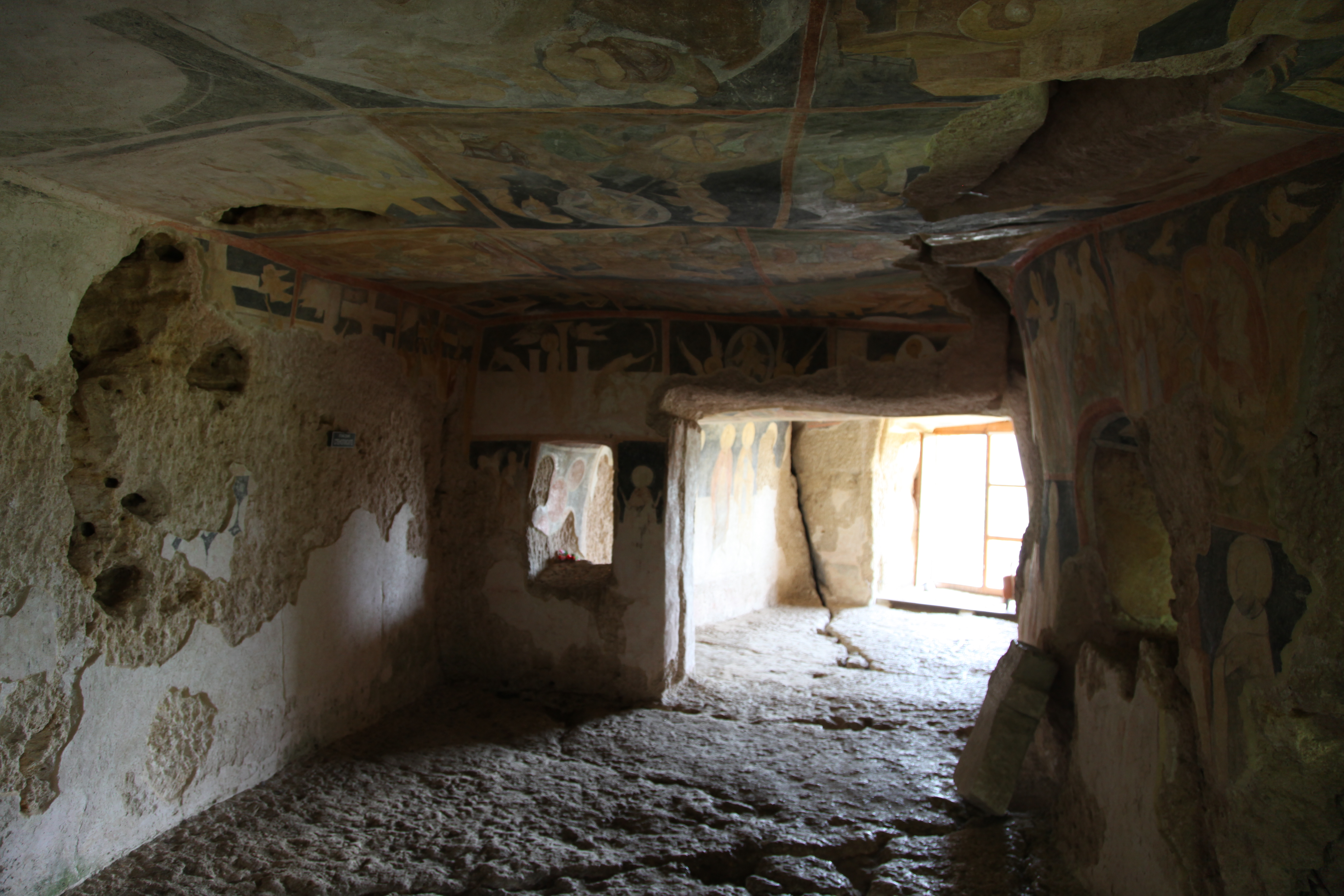

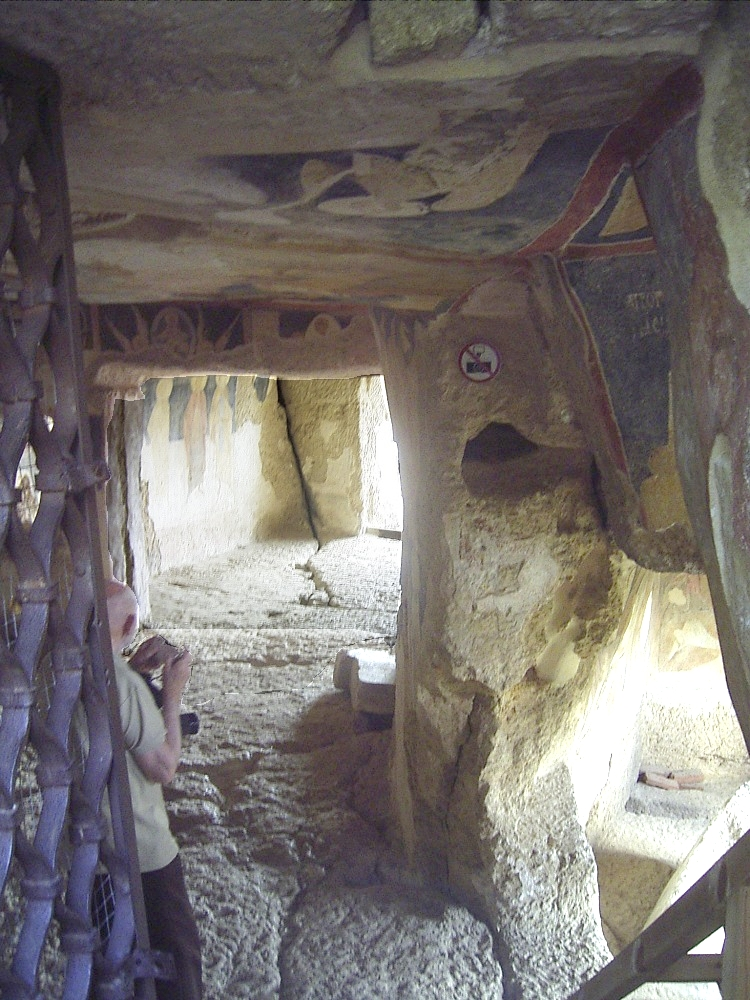

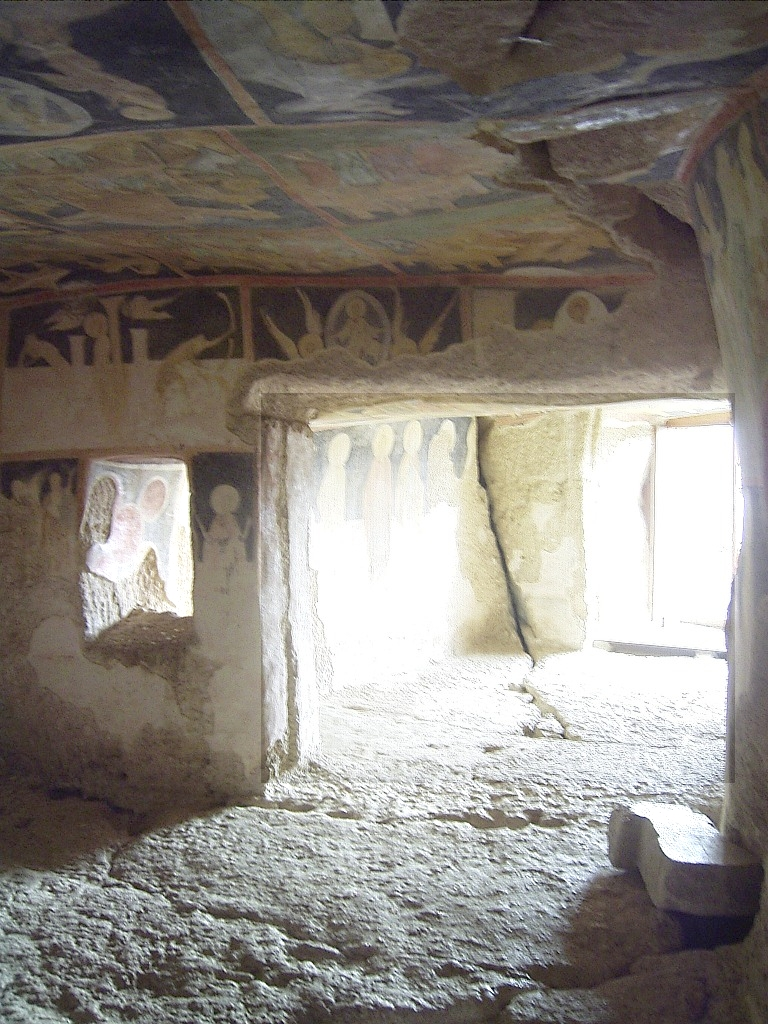

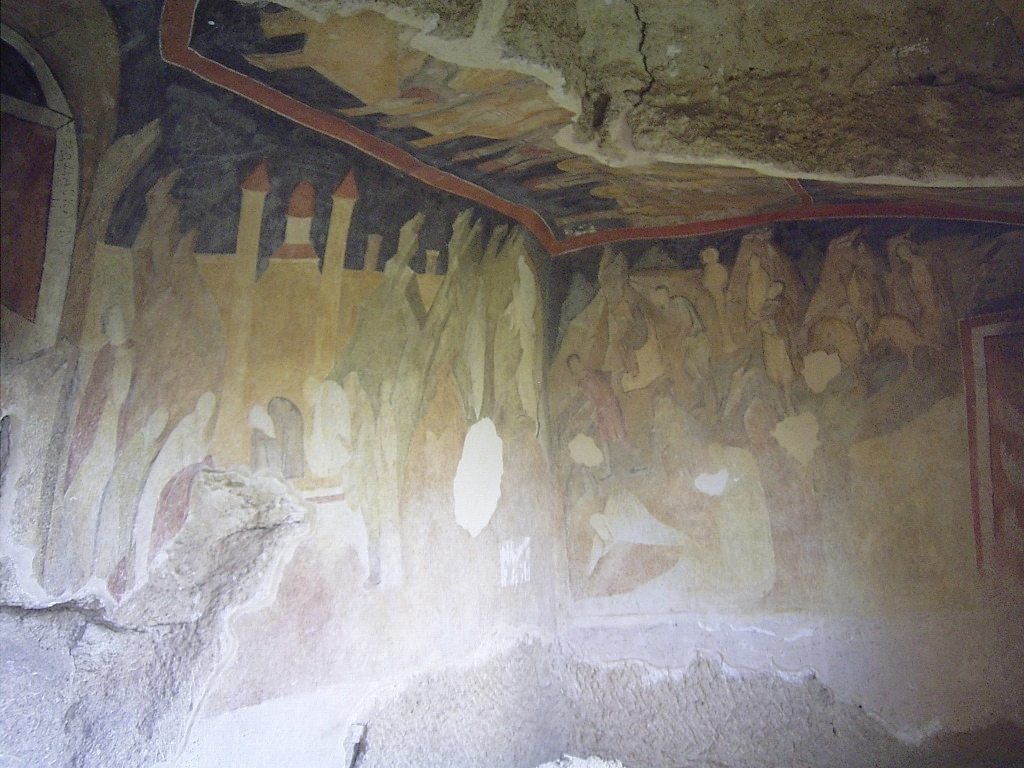

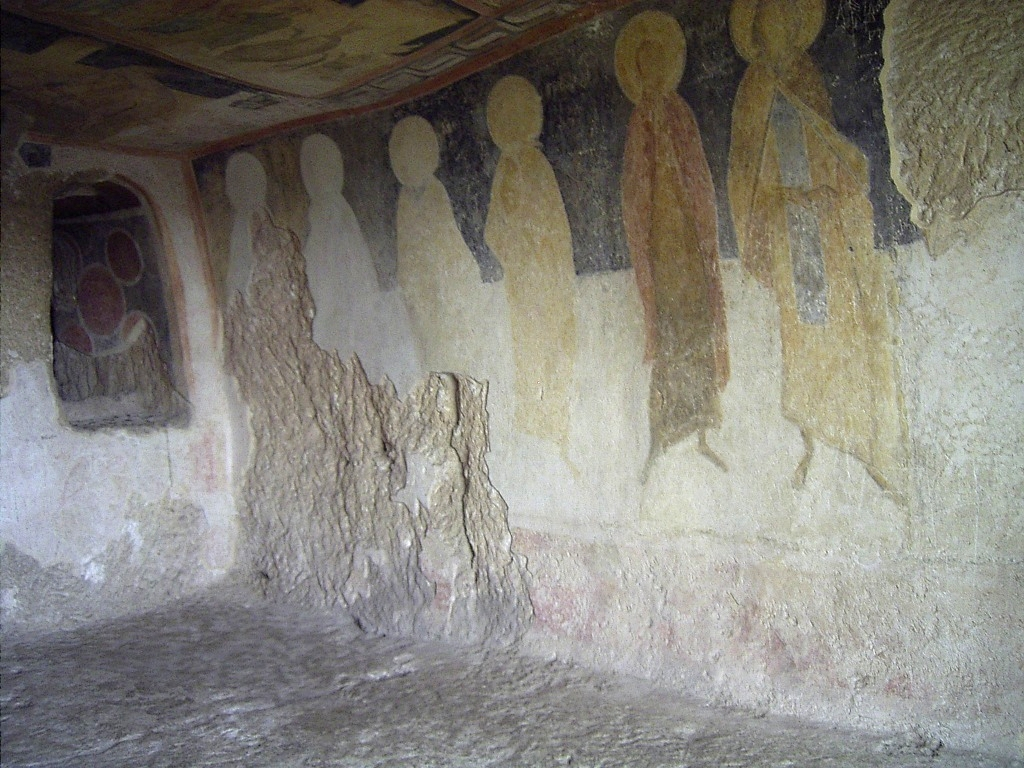

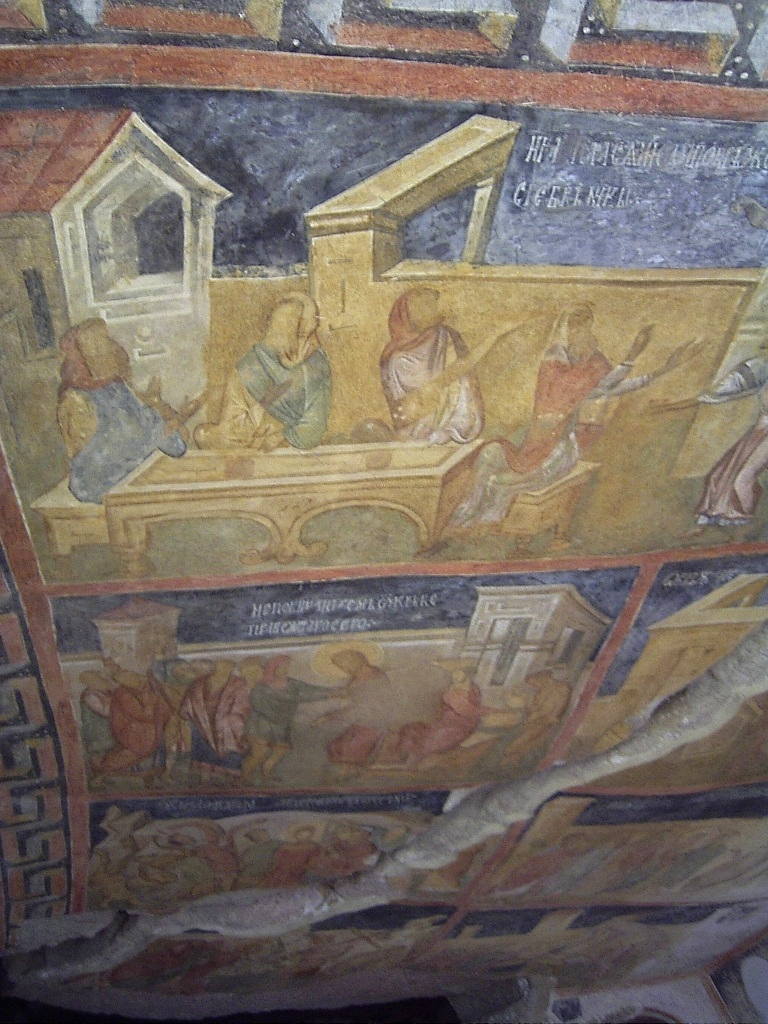

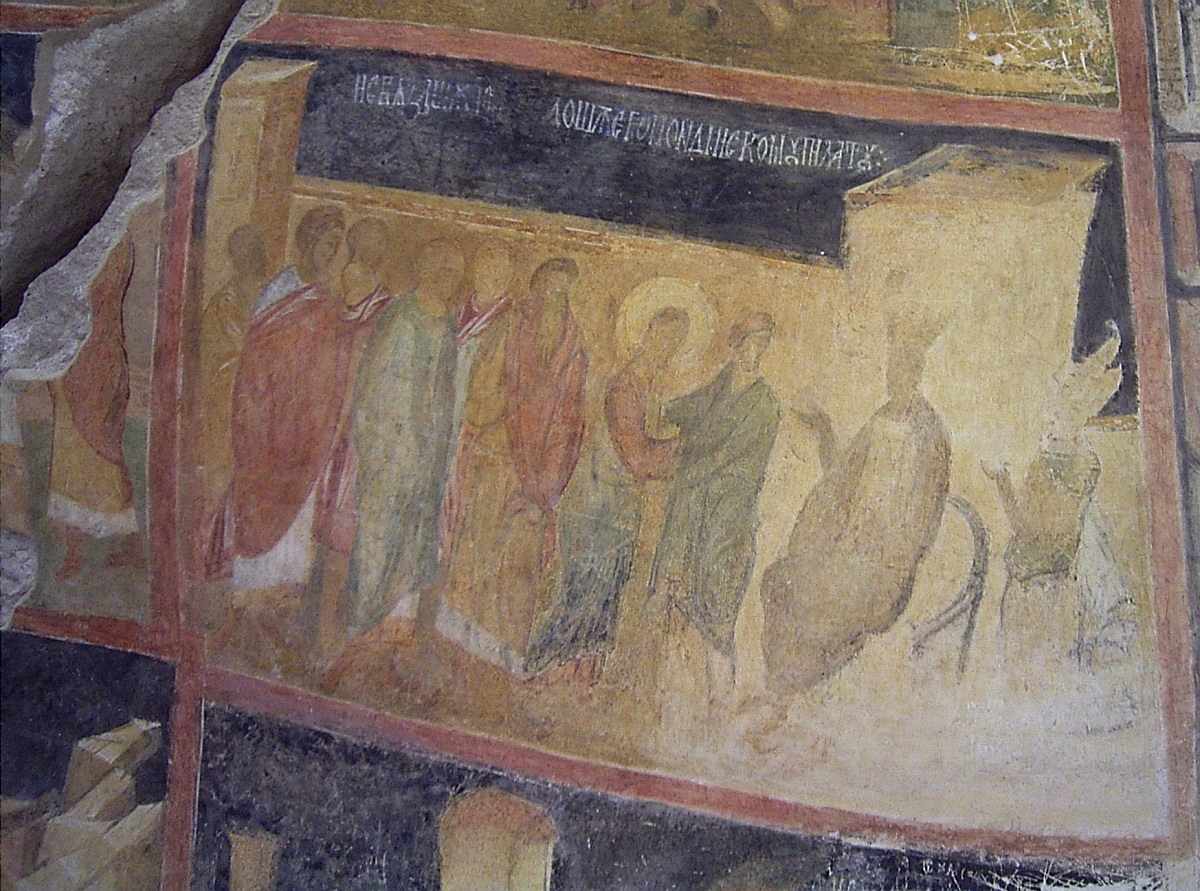

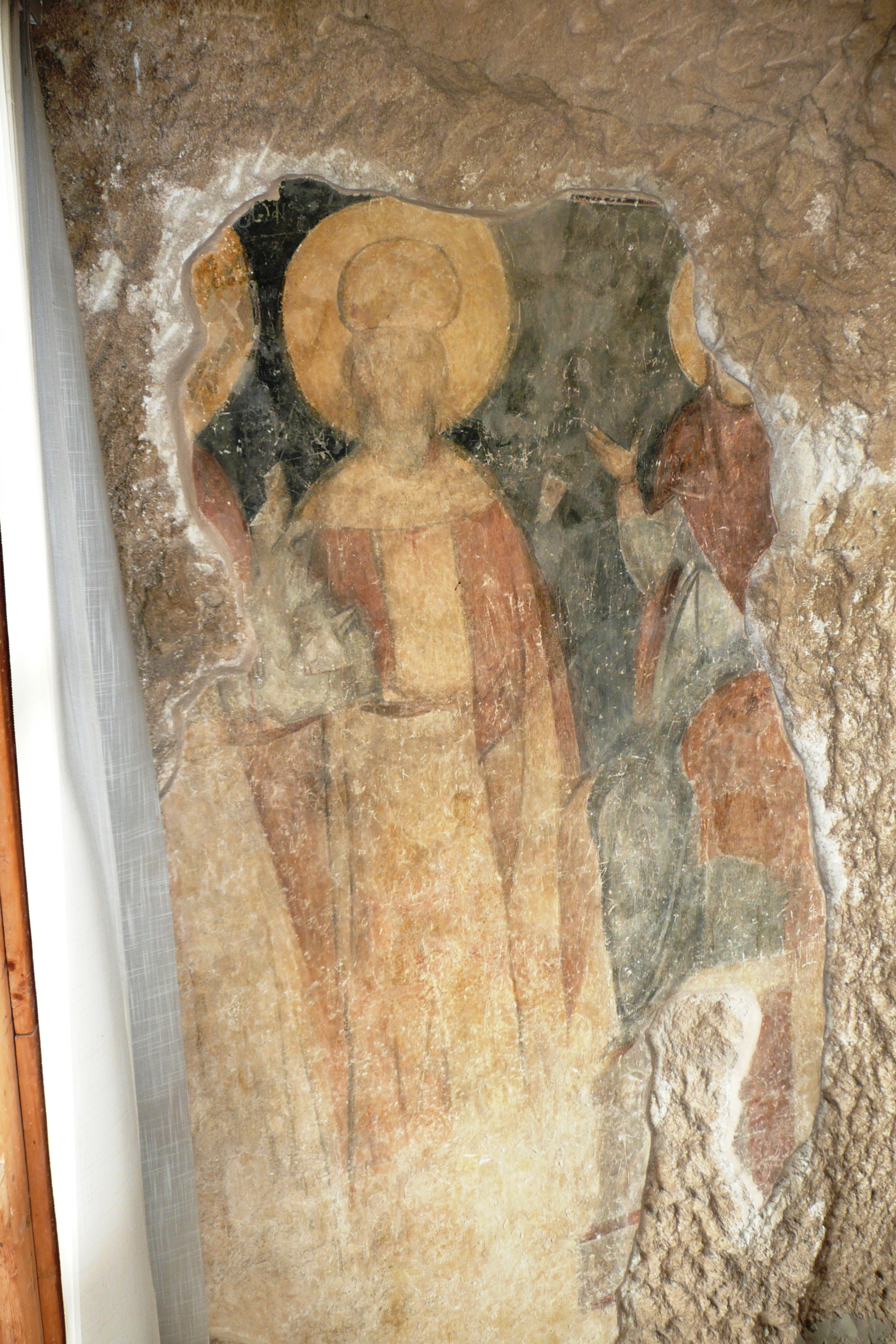
14th century mural portrait of Tsar Ivan Alexander from the Rock-hewn Churches of Ivanovo

== Burials ==
- George I of Bulgaria

== See also ==
- Aladzha Monastery
- Albotin Monastery
- Cave monastery
- Monolithic church
