= Ivanovo, Ruse Province =

Ivanovo Иваново
- Location of Ivanovo
- Coordinates: 43°42′N 25°59′E
- Country: Bulgaria
- Provinces (Oblast): Rousse

Government
  - Mayor: Danka Mateeva
- Elevation: 45 m (148 ft)

Population (2008)
  - Total: 921
- Time zone: UTC+2 (EET)
  - Summer (DST): UTC+3 (EEST)
- Postal Code: 7088
- Area code: 08116

Ivanovo (Bulgarian: Иваново, pronounced [iˈvanovo]) is a village in northeastern Bulgaria, part of Rousse Province. It is the administrative centre of Ivanovo Municipality, which lies in the central part of Rousse Province.

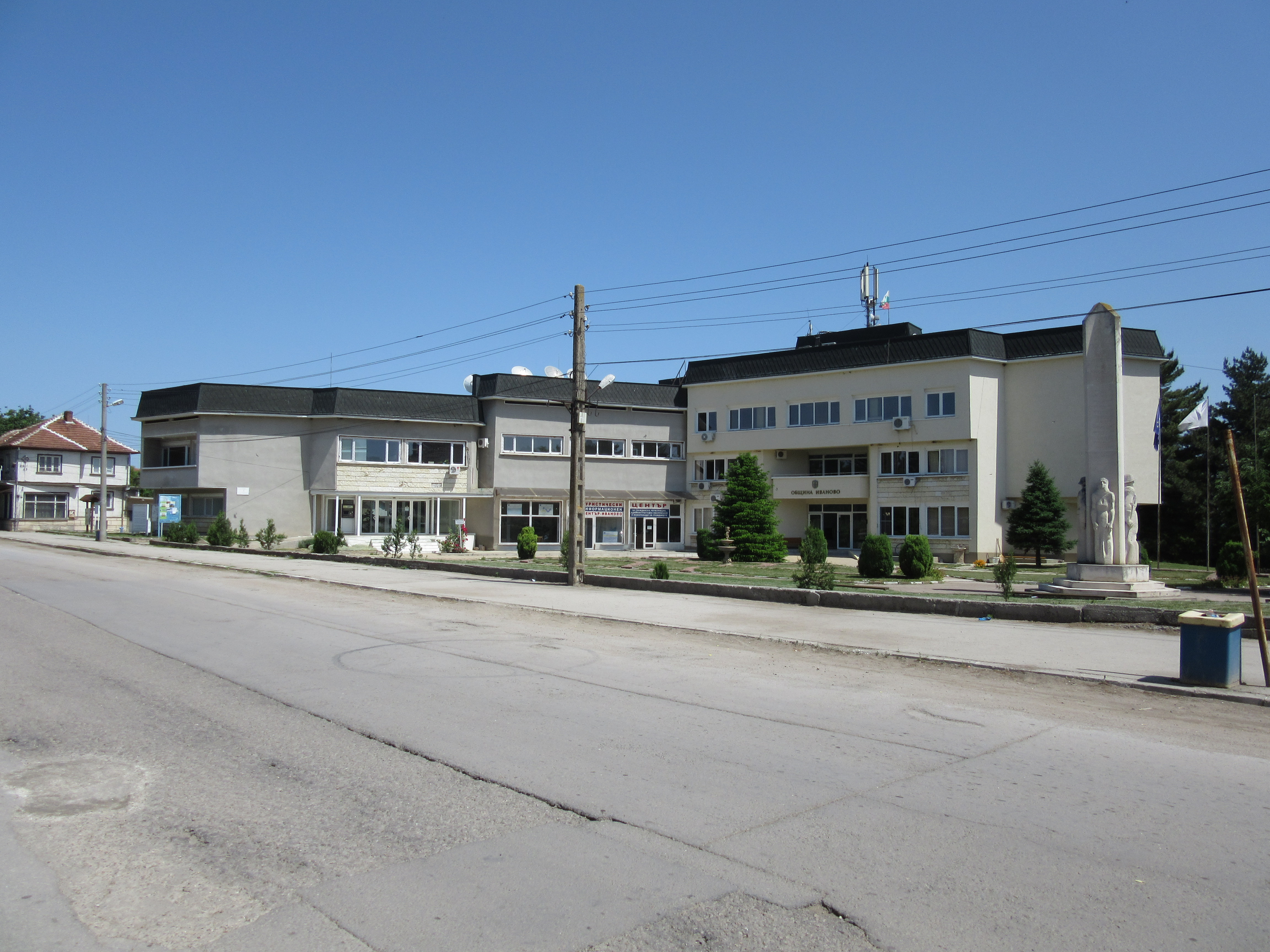
Ivanovo (Ruse Province) Municipality Hall

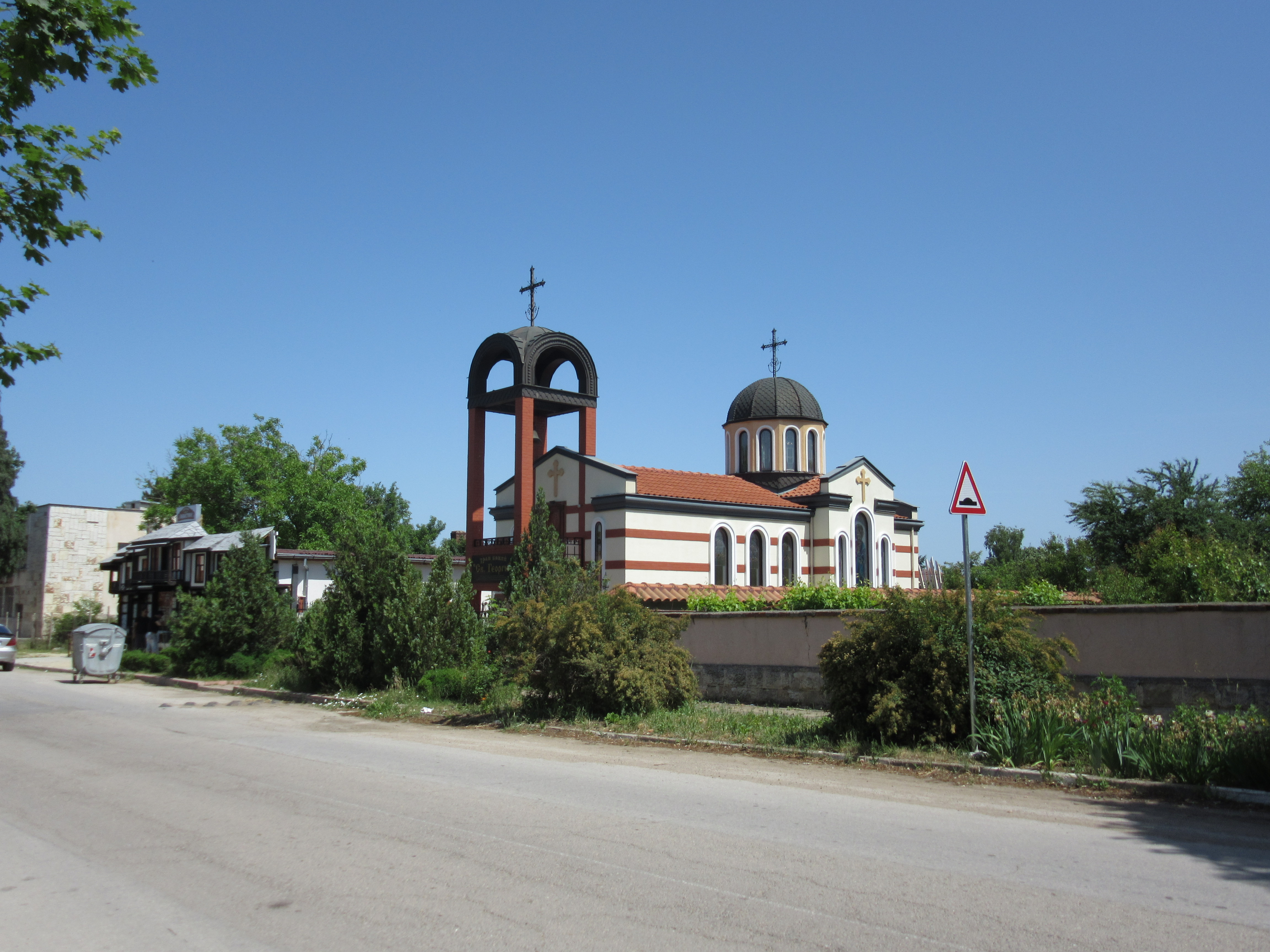
Saint George Church in Ivanovo (Ruse Province)

Ivanovo is located 20 kilometres south of the provincial capital of Rousse, in the eastern Danubian Plain. The village is famous for the Rock-hewn Churches of Ivanovo, a UNESCO World Heritage Site medieval group of monolithic Eastern Orthodox churches, chapels and cave monasteries hewn out of solid rock in the vicinity of Ivanovo. The monastical complex was active from the early 13th to the 17th century.

== Gallery ==
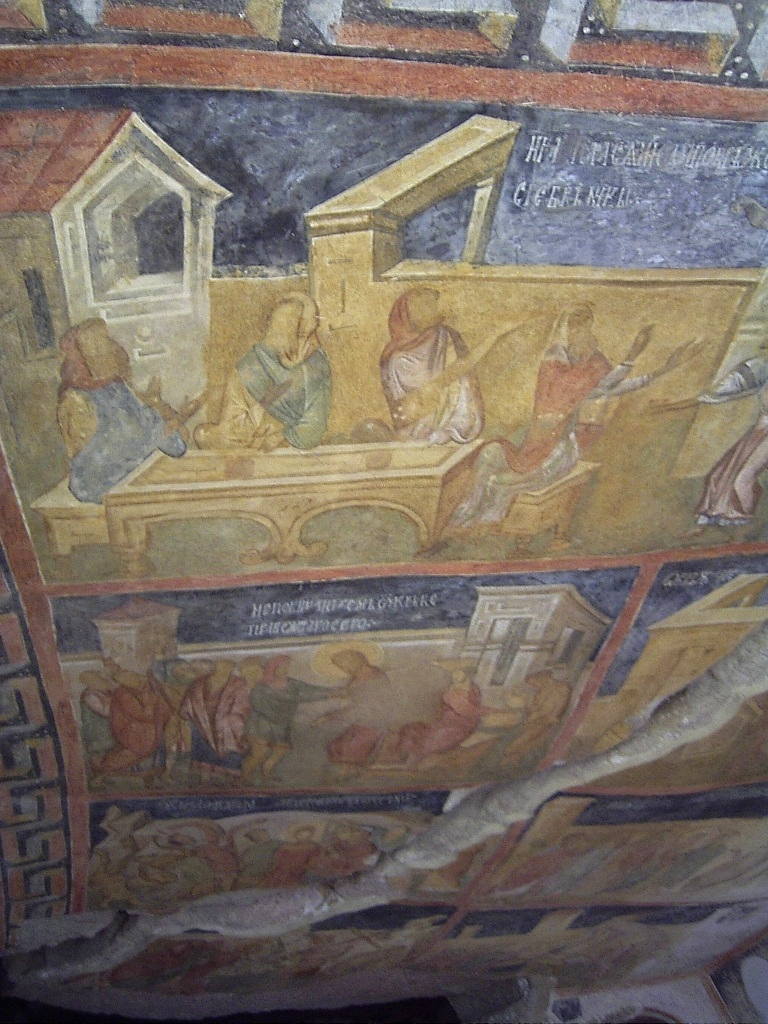
Murals in the Rock-hewn Churches of Ivanovo

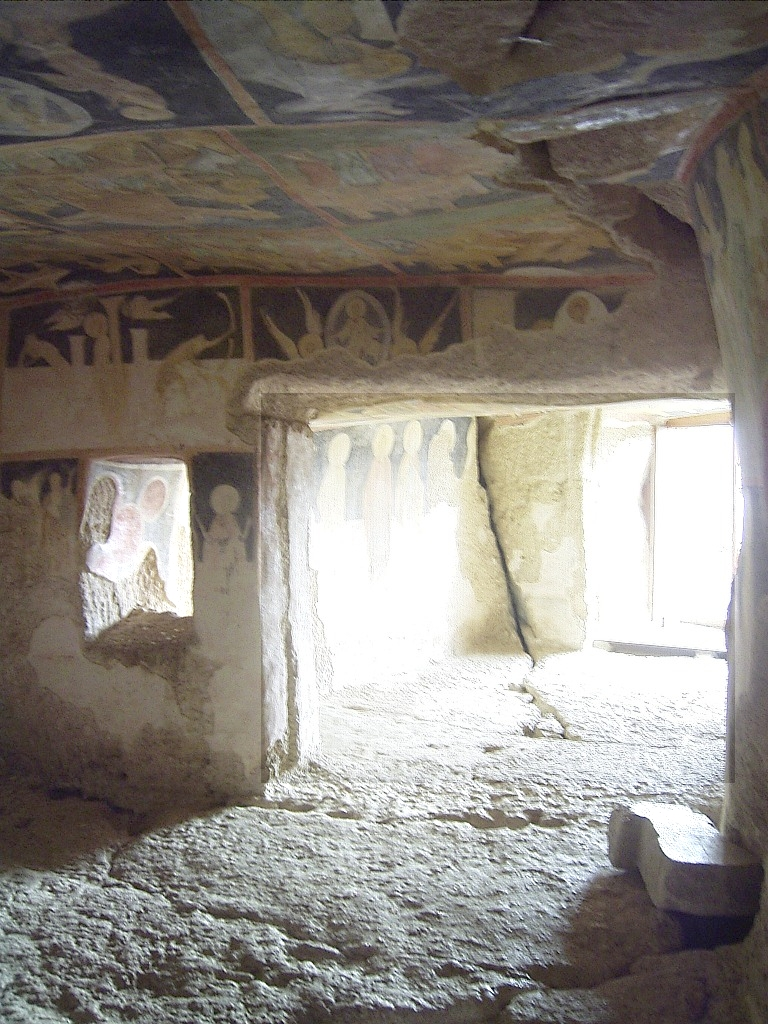
A cave church in the Rock-hewn Churches complex
