= July 8 (Eastern Orthodox liturgics) =

Day in the Eastern Orthodox liturgical calendar

Eastern Orthodox liturgical calendar
July 7	July 8	July 9
July 8 O.S. ≍ July 21 N.S. July 8 N.S ≍ June 25 O.S.

An Eastern Orthodox cross

July 8 in Eastern Orthodox liturgical calendars is a feast day and a day of commemoration of saints and martyrs. Although some Orthodox churches use the Revised Julian Calendar and others use the traditional Julian calendar, the fixed commemorations for their respective July 8 are broadly the same, no matter which calendar is used. (Note: Despite the dates being the same, the days to which they refer typically differ by 13 days. The notation Old Style or O.S. is sometimes used to indicate a date in the traditional Julian Calendar (the "Old Calendar"). The notation New Style or N.S. indicates a date in the Revised Julian calendar (the "New Calendar").)

== Saints ==
- Hieromartyr Epictetus, Priest, and Monk-martyr Astion, at Halmyris in Scythia Minor (Romania) (290)
- Great-martyr Procopius of Caesarea in Palestine, and with him (303): (Note: "In Palestine, in the reign of Diocletian, St. Procopius, martyr, who was brought from Scythopolis to Caesarea, and upon his first resolute answer was beheaded by the judge Fabian.") (Note: Name days celebrated today include: Prokopios, Prokopis, Procopius (Προκόπιος).)

- Martyrs Theodosia (his mother), tribunes Antiochus and Nicostratus, martyrs Abdias and Sabbas, and twelve women of senatorial rank, all by the sword.

- Martyr Mirdat, King of Kartli, Georgia (410)

== Pre-Schism Western saints ==
- Saints Aquila and Priscilla, a Christian missionary married couple described in the New Testament (Acts 18:3, Rom. 16:3-4) (1st century) (Note: "Husband and wife, belonging to the Jewish diaspora, who worked as tentmakers at Rome and were exiled from there with all the other Jews under Claudius. They settled in Corinth, where they received the Apostle Paul into their house (Acts 18,3). Under Nero they returned to Rome and Paul sent greetings to them. A tradition in Rome says that they were martyred there." Saint Aquila was Bishop of Heraclea, preached the word of God in Asia Minor and Achaia, and was killed by unbelievers.) (Note: "In Asia Minor, the Saints Aquila and his wife Priscilla, of whom mention is made in the Acts of the Apostles.") (see also: February 13, July 14)
- Saint Auspicius of Trier, the fourth Bishop of Trier in Germany and successor of St Maternus (c. 130)
- Saint Apollonius, Bishop of Benevento in Italy (c. 326) (Note: He went into hiding during the last persecution under Diocletian.) (Note: See also: (in Italian) Apollonio di Benevento. Wikipedia. (Italian Wikipedia).)
- Saints Sostratus, Spirus, Eraclius, Eperentius and Cecilia, martyrs of Syrmium in Pannonia (4th century)
- Saint Morwenna, patroness of Morwenstow, England (5th or 6th century) (Note: Several places are named after her, notably Morwenstow in Cornwall, where her relics are probably buried under the church floor and where she has appeared. She is often confused with St. Modwenna (July 5th), who lived two centuries later.) (see also July 5 )
- Saint Urith of Chittlehampton (Hieritha), a nun martyred by pagan English invaders at Chittlehampton in Devon (6th century?) (Note: Her shrine was in the village church there, where her relics may still be buried under the floor.)
- Saints Kilian (Chilianus), Colman and Totnan, monks from Ireland, Enlighteners of Franconia and East Thuringia, where they were martyred (c. 689) (Note: "At Wurtzburg, in Germany, St. Kilian, bishop, who was commissioned by the Roman Pontiff to preach the Gospel. After having converted many to Christ, he was put to death with his companions, Column, a priest, and Totnan, a deacon.") (Note: Kilian was Bishop of Wurzburg in Germany where he is still honoured.)
- Saint Landrada of Austrasia, foundress and first Abbess of Munsterbilsen in Belgium (c. 690)
- Saint Withburgh of East Anglia (Withburga), an anchoress at East Dereham, Norfolk, England (c. 743) (Note: Youngest daughter of King Anna of East Anglia in England. After her father had fallen in battle, she became a nun and lived as an anchoress at East Dereham in Norfolk, founding a convent there.)
- Saint Arnold of Arnoldsweiler, a charitable Greek musician at the court of Charlemagne (c. 800) (Note: Apparently of Greek descent, he was famed for his charity to the poor. He has left his name to the village, Arnold-Villiers (Arnoldsweiler) near Jülich, now in Germany.) (Note: See also: (in German) Arnold von Arnoldsweiler.)
- Blessed Edgar the Peaceful, King of Mercia and Northumbria, and upon the death of his brother Eadwig (A.D. 959), King of all England (975) (Note: A King of England who repented of a depraved youth and whose reign was marked by a strong religious revival in England.)
- Saint Grimbald, monk at St. Bertin Abbey in Saint-Omer in Flanders, invited by King Alfred the Great to help restore scholarship in England, Abbot of Winchester(901)
- Virgin-martyr Sunniva (Sunnifa) and companions, on Selje Island, Norway (10th century) (Note: By tradition, Sunniva was a princess who fled from Ireland with her brother and others. They were shipwrecked off the coast of Norway but landed on Selje Island. Here they were slain by people from the mainland and their relics were enshrined in Bergen.)

== Post-Schism Orthodox saints ==
- Saint Procopius of Ustyug, Fool-for-Christ, Wonderworker of Ustiug, Vologda (1303)
- Venerable Theophilus the Myrrh-gusher of Pantocrator Monastery on Mount Athos (1548) (Note: Name days celebrated today include: Theophilos (Θεόφιλος).)
- Righteous Procopius, Fool-for-Christ, of Ustya, Vologda (c. 1600) (Note: See: (in Russian) Прокопий Устьянский. Википедии. (Russian Wikipedia).)
- New Hieromartyr Anastasius of Saint Blaise in Hegumenitsa, Priest, of Constantinople (1743)

=== New martyrs and confessors ===
- New Hieromartyrs Alexander Popov, Theodore Raspopov, and Nikolai Bryantsev, Priests (1918)
- New Hieromartyr Procopius (Titov), Archbishop of Kherson (1937) (Note: See: (in Russian) Прокопий (Титов). Википедии. (Russian Wikipedia).) (see also: November 10 )

== Icons ==
- Miracle of the Annunciation Icon of the Mother of God at Ustiug (1290)
- Appearance of the Kazan Icon of the Most Holy Theotokos (1579)
- Reverence list of a "Kazan" Icon of the Most Holy Theotokos, at:

- Kazan (1579)
- "Yaroslavl" (1588)
- Moscow (1612)
- "Viazniky" (1624)
- Nizhnelomovskaya (1643)
- Vitebsk (1655)
- "Tobolsk" (1661)
- "Kaplunovka" (1689)
- "Tambov" (1695)
- Shlisselburg (1702)
- "Penza" (1717) (see also: August 4)
- Petersburg (1721)
- "Peschanka" / "Peschanskaya" (1754) (Note: See: (in Russian) Песчанская икона Божией Матери. Википедии. (Russian Wikipedia).)
- "Chimeev" (1770)
- "Vysochinovsky" (18th century)
- "Vyshensky" (1812)

- "Jacobshtad" Icon of the Most Holy Theotokos (17th century)
- Icon of the Most Holy Theotokos Weeping "Umileniye" ("Of Tender Feeling") of Novgorod.
- Icon of the Mother of God "Our Lady of Sitka", Alaska (1850)

== Other commemorations ==
- Translation of the relics (1779) of St. Demetrius of Basarabov, Bulgaria, to Bucharest (1685)
- Slaying of Anastasia Strogilos on the Mount of Olives (1995)
- Synaxis of All Military Saints of the Orthodox Church (2019) (Note: On Mount Athos the Synaxis of All Military Saints is celebrated on May 24th, and there is a Divine Office composed for this feast.) (see also: October 26 - Romanian Orthodox Church.)

== Icon gallery ==
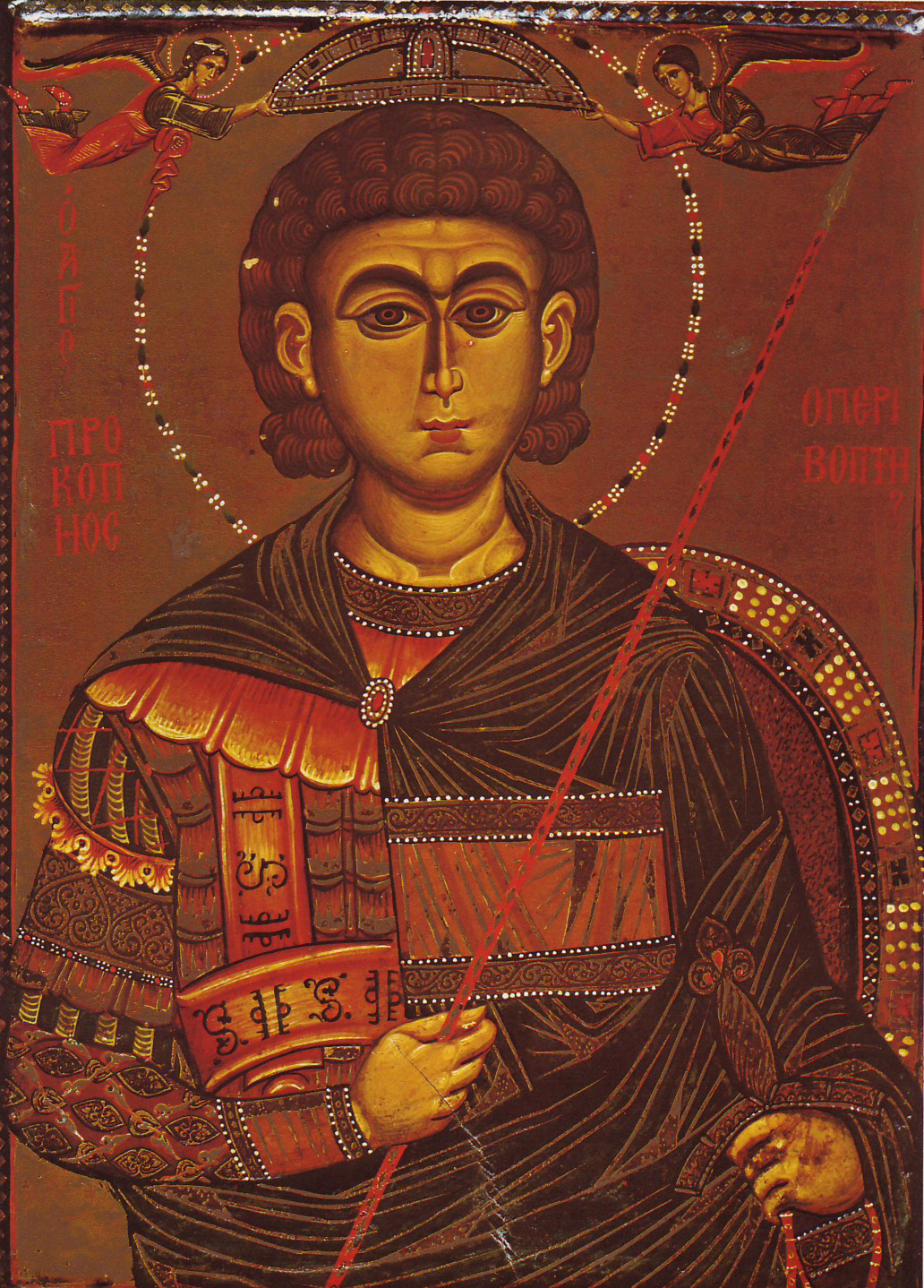
Great-martyr Procopius of Caesarea in Palestine.

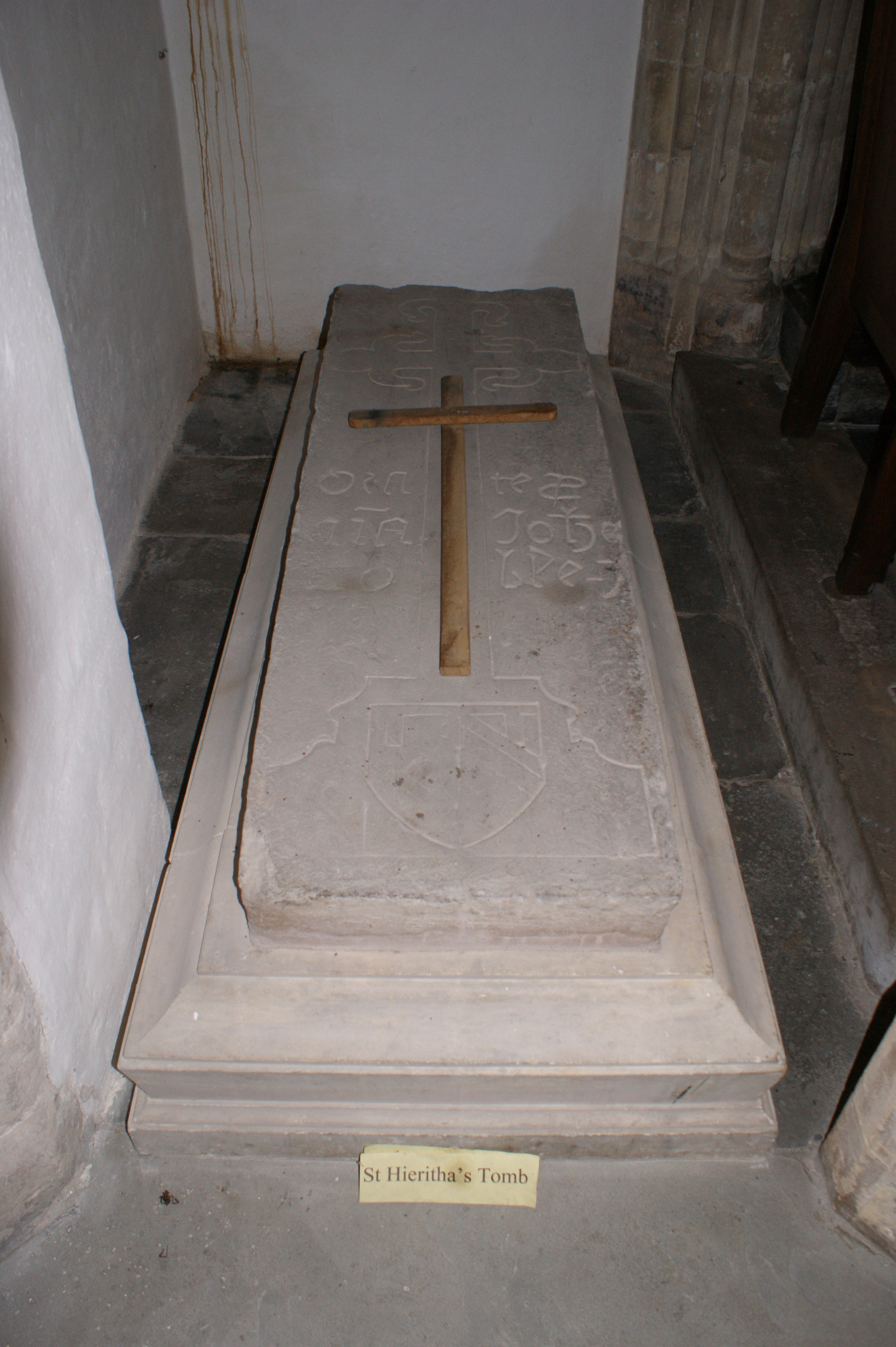
St. Urith of Chittlehampton's (Hieritha's) tomb.

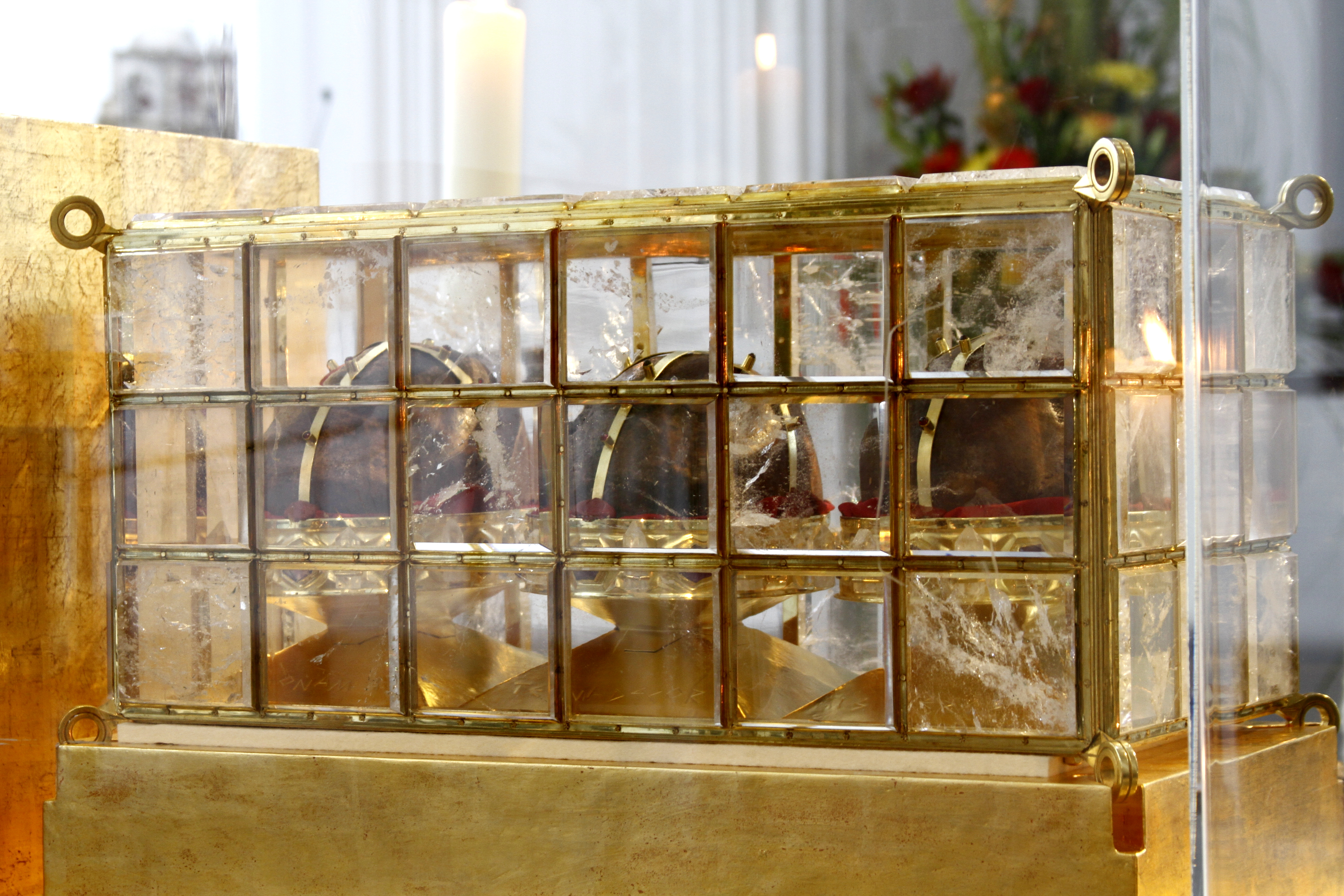
Relics of Saints Kilian, Colman and Totnan.

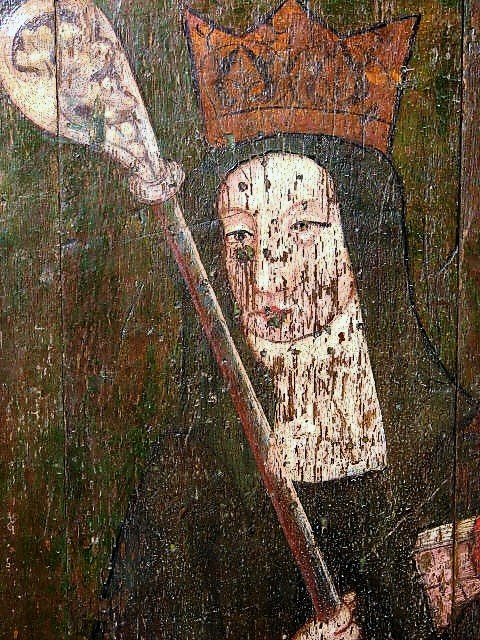
St. Withburgh of East Anglia.

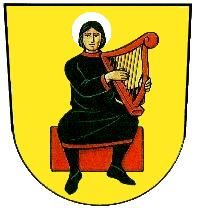
St. Arnold of Arnoldsweiler (Coat of arms of Arnoldsweiler).

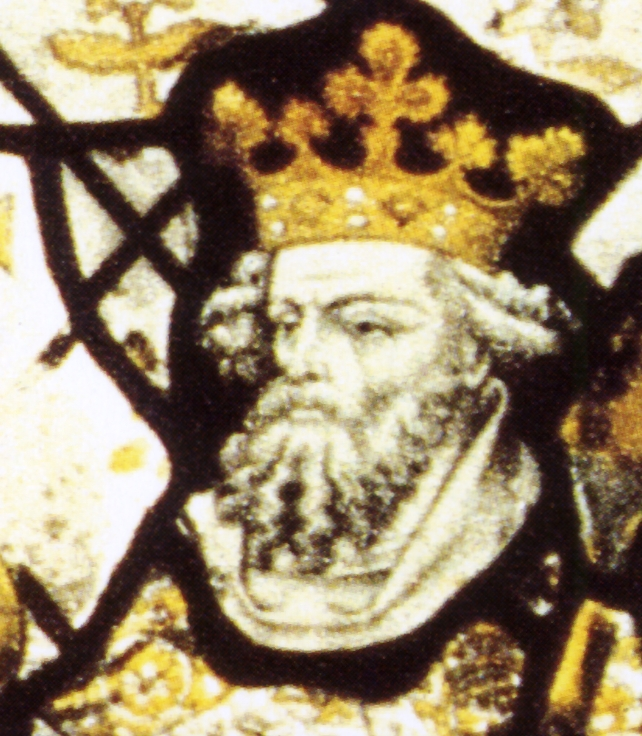
Blessed Edgar the Peaceful.

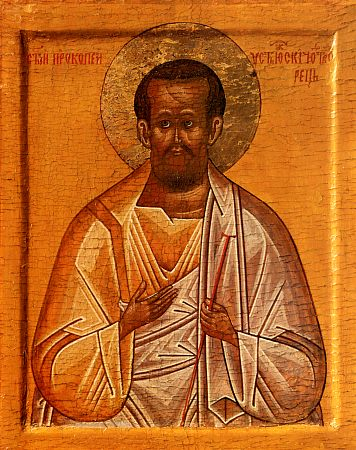
St. Procopius of Ustyug.

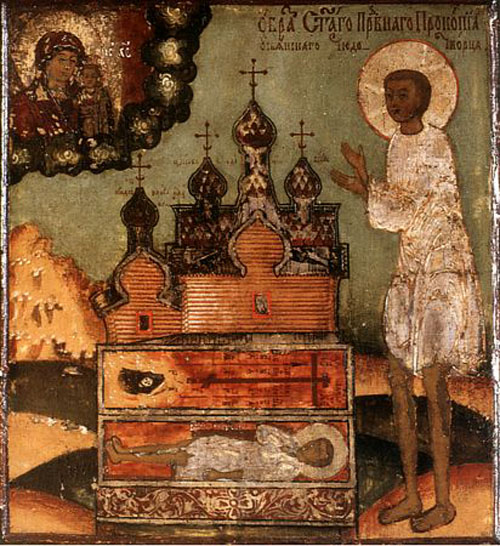
Righteous Procopius, Fool-for-Christ, of Ustya.

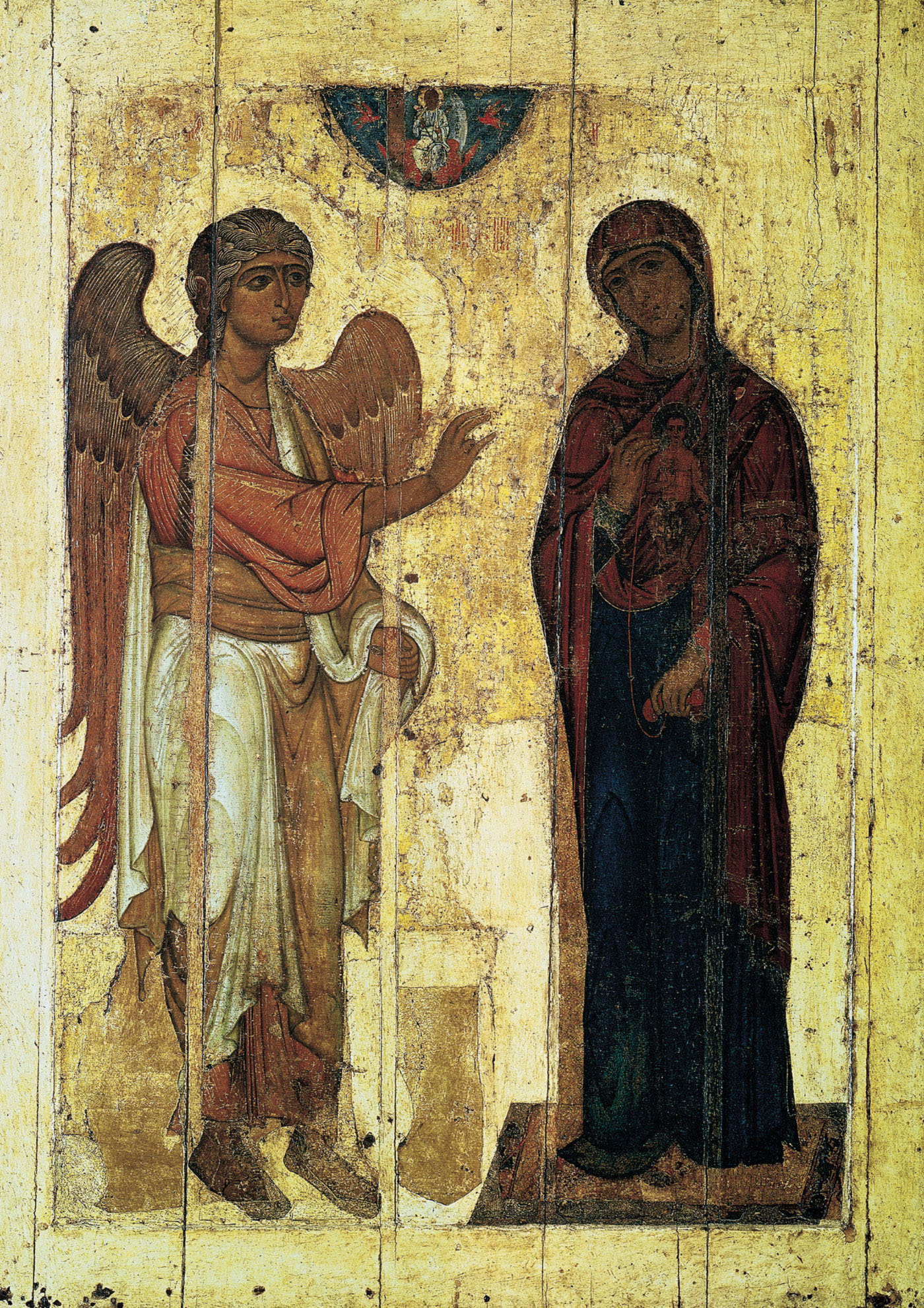
Ustyug Annunciation.

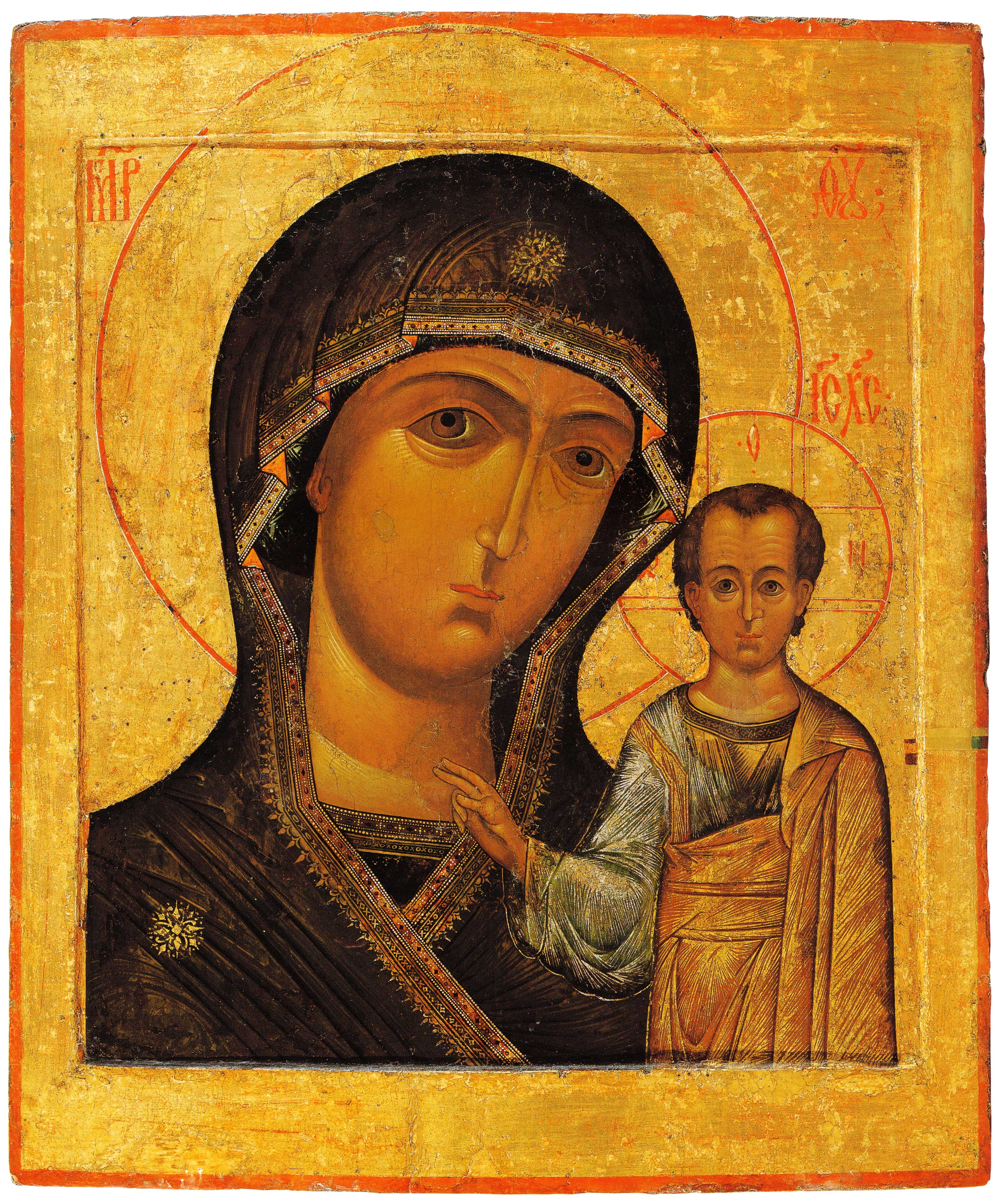
Kazan Icon of the Most Holy Theotokos, copy in the museum of Rostov Kremlin

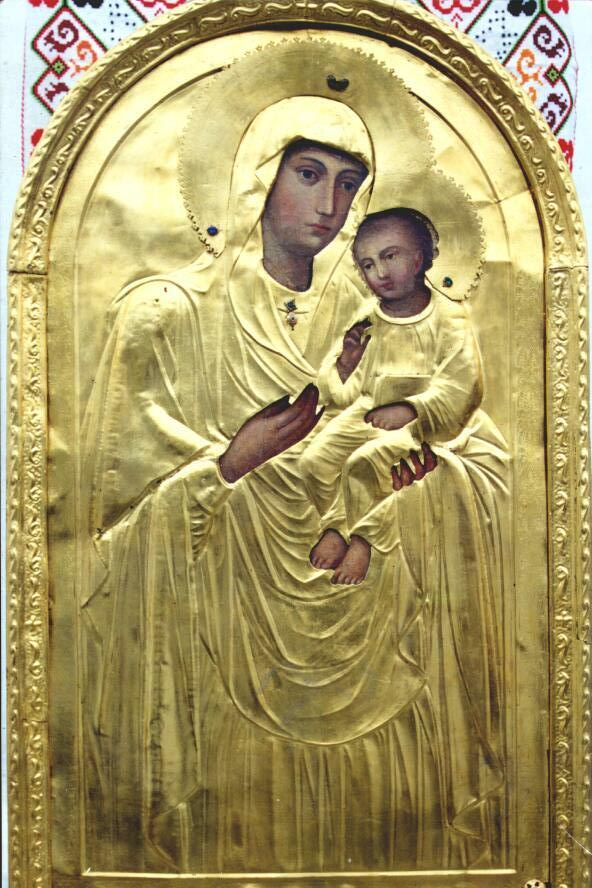
Icon of the Most Holy Theotokos Peschanskaya.

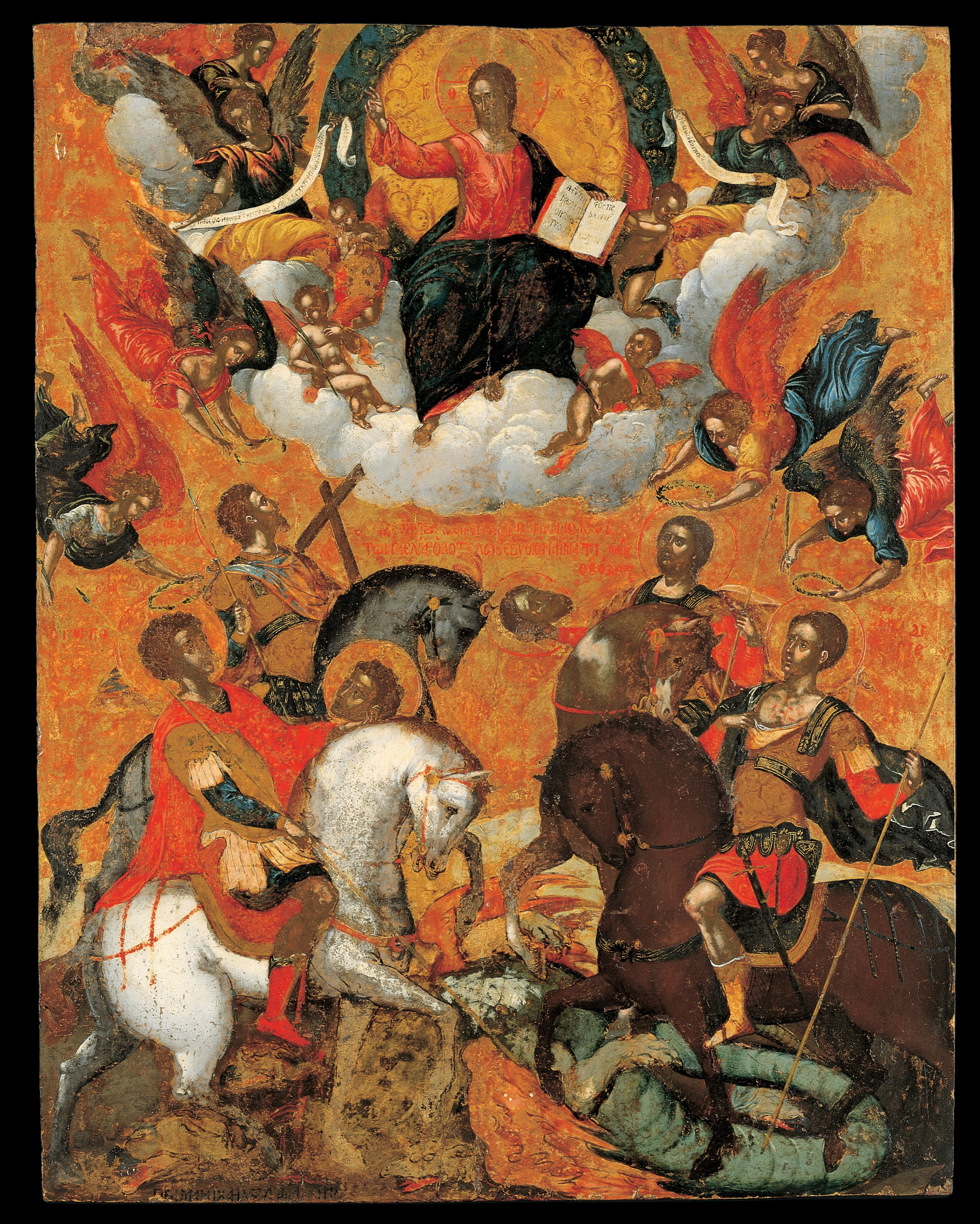
Four Military Saints by Michael Damaskinos, showing St George and St Theodore Teron on the left, and St Demetrios and St Theodore Stratelates on the right.

== Sources ==
- July 8/July 21. Orthodox Calendar (PRAVOSLAVIE.RU).
- July 21 / July 8. HOLY TRINITY RUSSIAN ORTHODOX CHURCH (A parish of the Patriarchate of Moscow).
- July 8. OCA - The Lives of the Saints.
- July 8. The Year of Our Salvation - Holy Transfiguration Monastery, Brookline, Massachusetts.
- The Autonomous Orthodox Metropolia of Western Europe and the Americas (ROCOR). St. Hilarion Calendar of Saints for the year of our Lord 2004. St. Hilarion Press (Austin, TX). p. 50.
- The Eighth Day of the Month of July. Orthodoxy in China.
- July 8. Latin Saints of the Orthodox Patriarchate of Rome.
- The Roman Martyrology. Transl. by the Archbishop of Baltimore. Last Edition, According to the Copy Printed at Rome in 1914. Revised Edition, with the Imprimatur of His Eminence Cardinal Gibbons. Baltimore: John Murphy Company, 1916. pp. 199–200.
- Rev. Richard Stanton. A Menology of England and Wales, or, Brief Memorials of the Ancient British and English Saints Arranged According to the Calendar, Together with the Martyrs of the 16th and 17th Centuries. London: Burns & Oates, 1892. pp. 324–328.

Greek Sources

- Great Synaxaristes: (in Greek) 8 ΙΟΥΛΙΟΥ. ΜΕΓΑΣ ΣΥΝΑΞΑΡΙΣΤΗΣ.
- (in Greek) Συναξαριστής. 8 Ιουλίου. ECCLESIA.GR. (H ΕΚΚΛΗΣΙΑ ΤΗΣ ΕΛΛΑΔΟΣ).
- (in Greek) ΙΟΥΛΙΟΣ. Αποστολική Διακονία της Εκκλησίας της Ελλάδος (Apostoliki Diakonia of the Church of Greece).
- (in Greek) 08/07/2018. Ορθόδοξος Συναξαριστής.

Russian Sources

- (in Russian) 21 июля (8 июля). Православная Энциклопедия под редакцией Патриарха Московского и всея Руси Кирилла (электронная версия). (Orthodox Encyclopedia - Pravenc.ru).
- (in Russian) 8 июля по старому стилю / 21 июля по новому стилю. Русская Православная Церковь - Православный церковный календарь на 2018 год.
- (in Russian) 8 июля (ст.ст.) 21 июля 2014 (нов. ст.). Русская Православная Церковь Отдел внешних церковных связей. (DECR).
