= Audible =

Audible may refer to:

- Audible (service), an online audiobook store
- Audible (American football), a tactic used by quarterbacks
- Audible (film), a short documentary film featuring a deaf high school football player
- Audible finish or rushed finish, see Glossary of professional wrestling terms#R
- Audible frequency
- Audible range

== See also ==
- The Audible Doctor (born 1984), record producer and rapper
- Audible Life Stream, the esoteric essence of God
- Audible Minority, a record album
- Audible line, a road safety feature
- Audible ringing tone, in telecommunication
- Audio (disambiguation)
- Hear (disambiguation)
- Hearing (disambiguation)
