= Basarbovo Monastery =

Bulgarian Orthodox cave monastery

Coordinates: 43°46′00″N 25°57′53″E

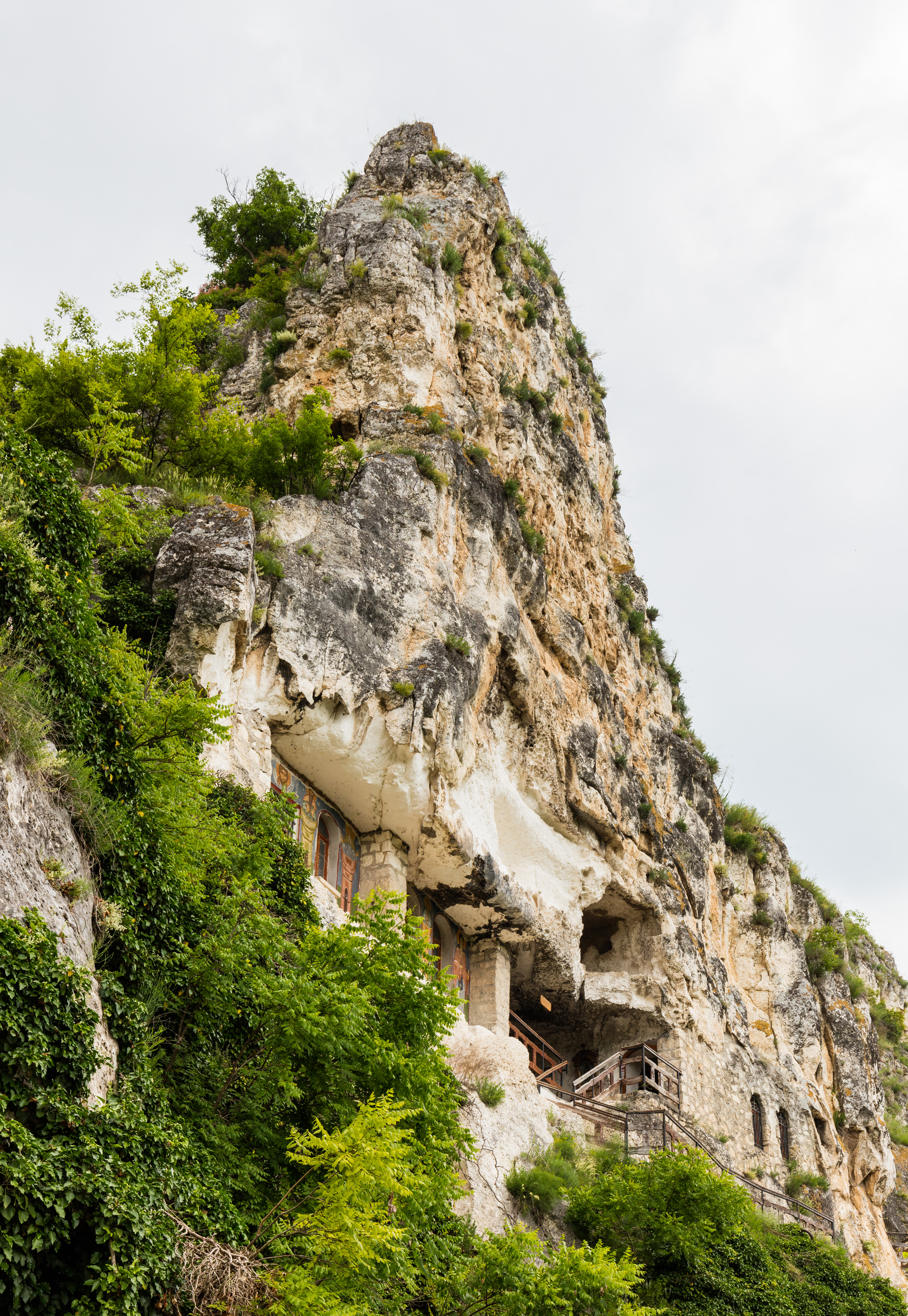
Outside view.

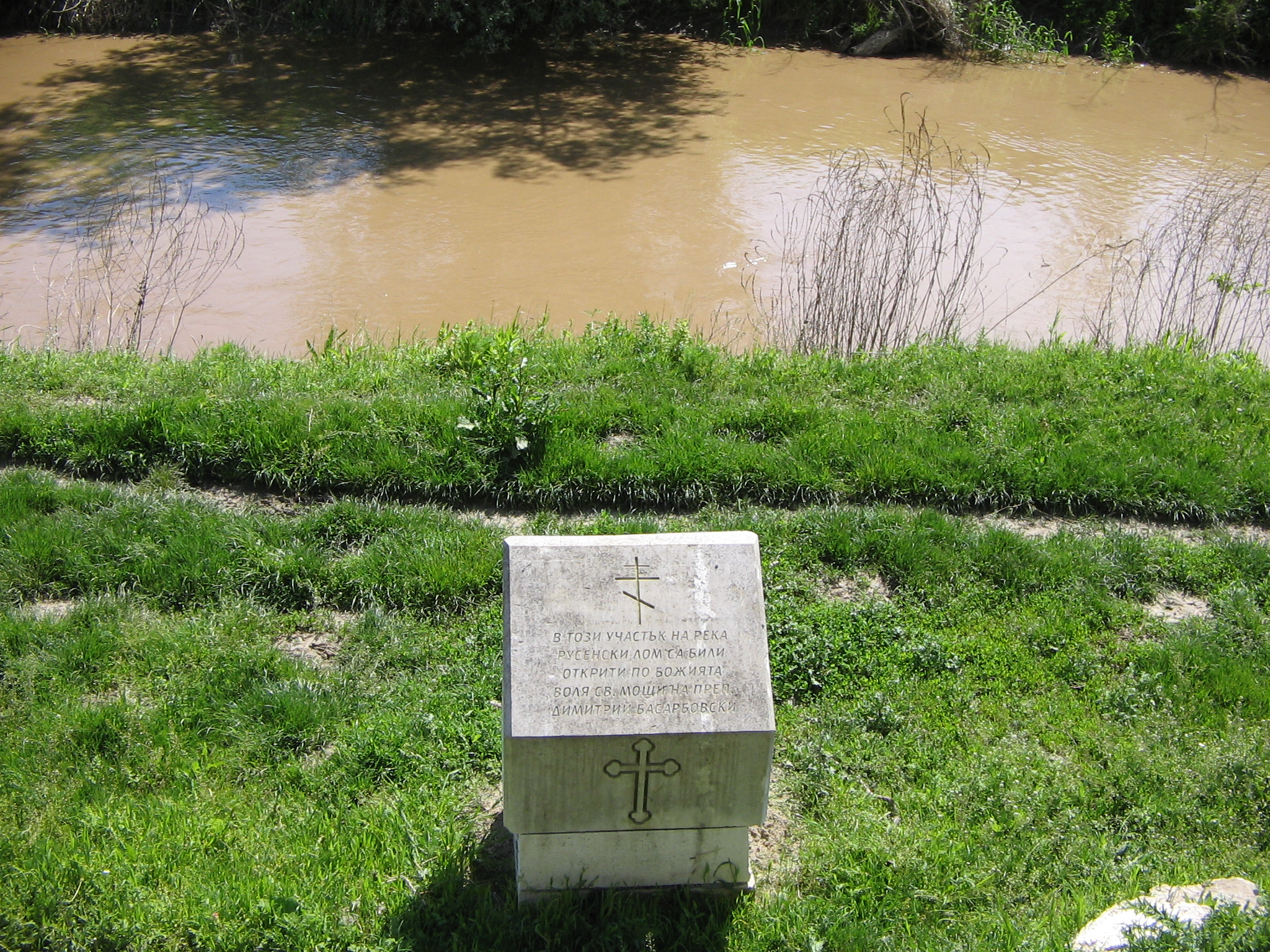
In this section of the river Rusenski Lom, according to God's will, were discovered the relics of Reverend Dimitar Basarbovski

Basarbovo Monastery (Bulgarian: Басарбовски манастир) – the Monastery of Saint Dimitar Basarbowski – is a Bulgarian Orthodox cave monastery near the city of Ruse in north-eastern Bulgaria. It has the same name as the nearby village of Basarbovo and lies about 35 metres above the Rusenski Lom river, south of the Danube.

Although founded during the Second Bulgarian Empire, the oldest written mention of the monastery dates back to the 15th century in an Ottoman tax register. The monastery became famous in the 17th century after the death of St. Dimitar Basarbovski (see Romanian and Bulgarian articles here and here), whom St Paisiy Hilendarski talks about in the book Istoriya Slavyanobolgarskaya. St. Dimitar Basarbovski was a shepherd and led an ascetic life among the cliffs of the monastery. He died in 1685. He was buried in the village church, but during the Russo-Turkish War of 1768-1774, General Pyotr Saltykov decided to transfer his relics to Russia. The road passed through Romania. At that time, that region was suffering through a plague epidemic. The legend says that when the saint's relics entered Bucharest, people stopped dying from the plague. The residents of the town asked the General to leave the saint's body there. Today his relics are located in Bucharest in the Sts. Constantine and Helena Church. In 1937, Father Hrisant settled in Basarbovo Monastery and revived it. The monastery celebrates its patron on October 26, St. Dimitar's Day.

It is the only active cave monastery in the modern history of Bulgaria. It was named a historical landmark in 1978.
