= Hear (disambiguation) =

To hear is to detect sound.

Hear or HEAR may also refer to:

- Hear (Diesel album), 2002
- Hear!, a 1992 album by Trixter
- H.E.A.R. (Hearing Education and Awareness for Rockers), a non-profit organization
- Hawaiian Ecosystems at Risk project (HEAR)
- El Arish International Airport, Egypt, ICAO airport code HEAR
- HEAR, a Lebanese-Canadian film director and music producer

== See also ==
- Hearing (disambiguation)
- Here (disambiguation)
- Hear, hear, an expression representing a listener's agreement
