= Lumi (band) =

Lebanese krautrock band

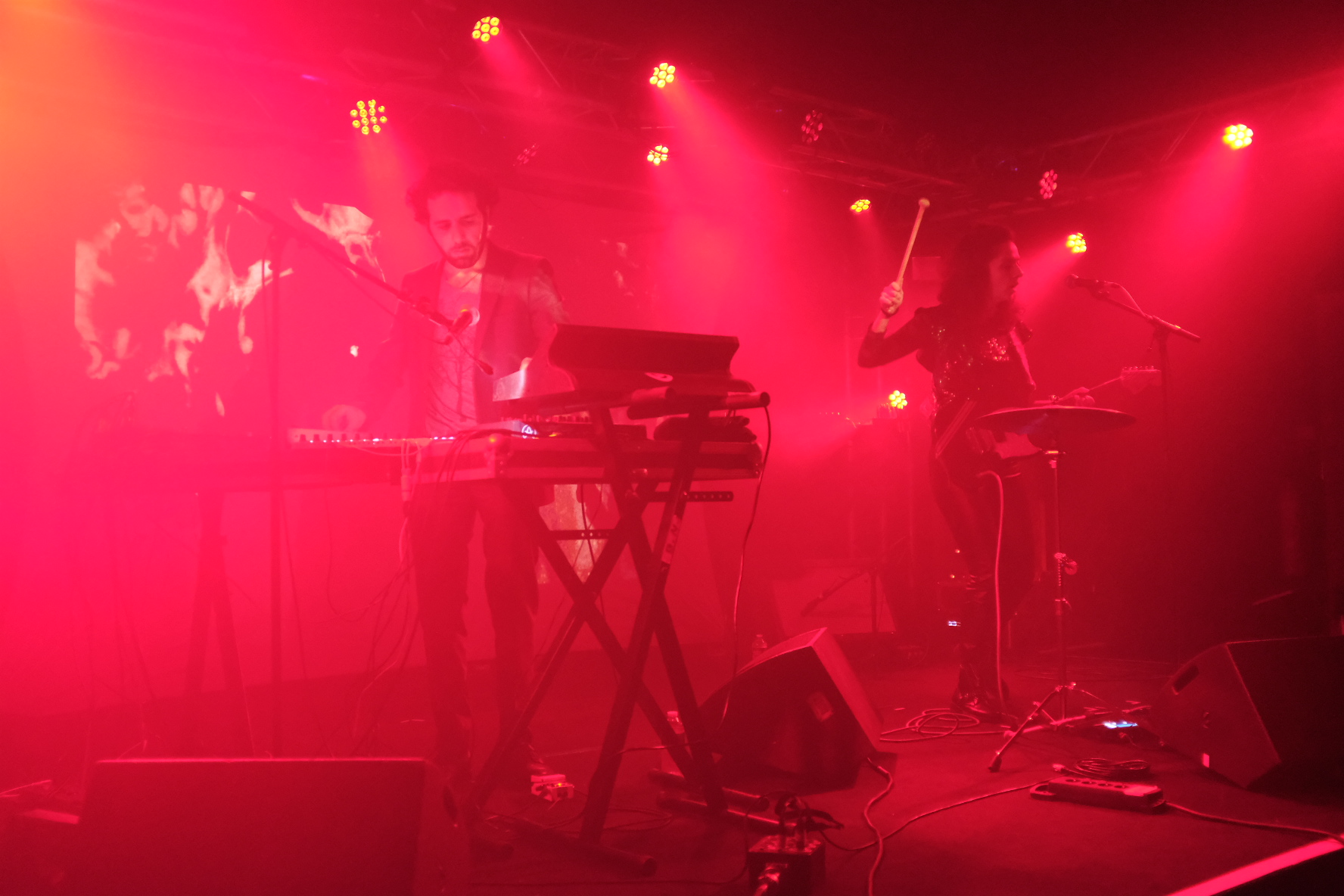
- Lumi in concert at La Boule noire in Paris (November 23rd, 2017)

Background information
- Origin: Beirut, Lebanon
- Genres: Pop, Electro, Rock, Glam Punk, Krautrock
- Years active: 2006–present
- Labels: EMI Arabia, Studio Keeward
- Members: Marc Codsi; Mayaline Hage

Lumi is a Lebanese krautrock band composed of Marc Codsi and Mayaline Hage. The band was formed in 2006, and has released two full-length studio albums.

== History ==
The band's style is a mixture of electro and rock and gained rapid attention in Beirut. After a few concerts in Beirut nightclubs like The Basement and B018, they released a self-produced EP. In 2006 during the Israeli invasion of Lebanon they wrote the song "Not Our War" and at the end of that summer they shot a video for their track "Don't F with my cat" with director Sary Sehnaoui (Hear).

In 2007 they signed with EMI Arabia, which led them to record their first album in Düsseldorf with producer Andi Thomas from Mouse on Mars. The album Two Tears in Water was released in June 2008. Following a crisis in the music industry shortly after their record deal, the band took a long hiatus.

In 2017, they released their second full-length album, The Night Was A Liar, through the Studio Keeward artist-in-residence program. The album was recorded at Montreal's Thee Mighty Hotel 2 Tango Studio with producer Radwan Moumneh (Jerusalem in my Heart), with SUUNS' Liam O'Neill on drums and Jessica Moss on violin.

They have toured extensively in Lebanon, Paris, London and Berlin.

== Discography ==
- Untitled, EP (2007), self-released
- Two Tears in Water (2008), EMI/Virgin Music
- The Night Was A Liar (2017), Studio Keeward
