= Audio =

Audio most commonly refers to sound, as it is transmitted in signal form. It may also refer to:

== Sound ==
- Audio signal, an electrical representation of sound
- Audio frequency, a frequency in the audio spectrum
- Digital audio, representation of sound in a form processed and/or stored by computers or digital electronics
- Audio, audible content (media) in audio production and publishing
- Semantic audio, extraction of symbols or meaning from audio
- Stereophonic audio, method of sound reproduction that creates an illusion of multi-directional audible perspective
- Audio equipment

== Entertainment ==
- AUDIO (group), an American R&B band of 5 brothers formerly known as TNT Boyz and as B5
- Audio (album), an album by the Blue Man Group
- Audio (magazine), a magazine published from 1947 to 2000
- Audio (musician), British drum and bass artist
- "Audio" (song), a song by LSD
- "Audios", a song by Black Eyed Peas from Elevation

== Computing ==
- HTML audio, identified by the <audio> tag

== See also ==
- Acoustic (disambiguation)
- Audible (disambiguation)
- Audiobook
- Radio broadcasting
- Sound recording and reproduction
- Sound reinforcement
