= Basarbovo =

Basarbovo Басарбово
- Village
- Location of Basarbovo
- Coordinates: 43°46′27″N 25°57′03″E
- Country: Bulgaria
- Province (Oblast): Ruse
- Municipality: Ruse

Government
  - Mayor: Nikolay Kolev (GERB)

Area
  - Total: 26.499 km^{2} (10.231 sq mi)
- Elevation: 81 m (266 ft)

Population (2018)
  - Total: 1 416
  - Density: 0.038/km^{2} (0.098/sq mi)
- Postal code: 7071
- Area code: 082

Basarbovo (Bulgarian: Басарбово) is a village in Northeast Bulgaria, in the Municipality of Ruse. As of 2018, the population is 1 416.

== Geography ==
Basarbovo is near Ruse. It is surrounded by hills on all sides, resulting in a softer climate than the nearby city. The river Rusenski Lom passes through it. As a result, a canyon is formed, similar to the one in the nearby Rusenski Lom Nature Park. This is one of the oldest climbing sites in Bulgaria.

In geological history, the territory of Basarbovo was once covered by Black Sea, resulting in limestone formations.

== History ==
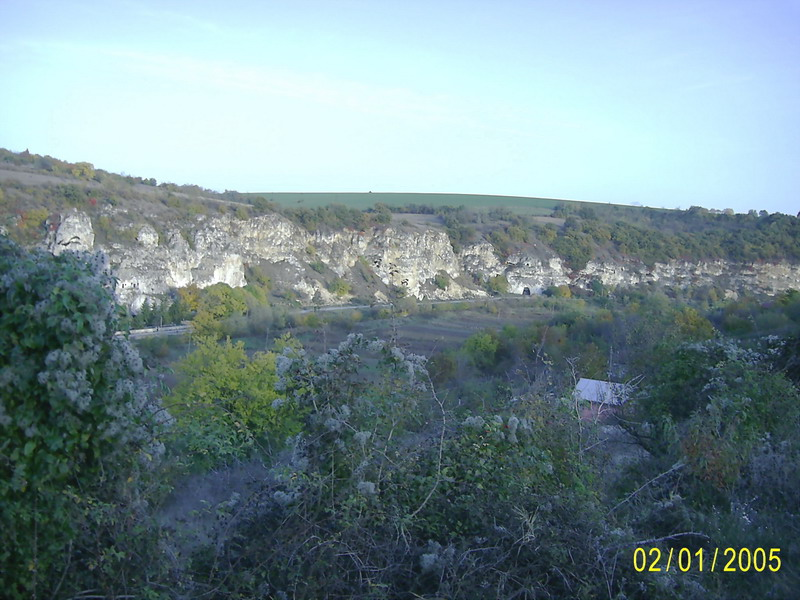
Basarbovo

It is believed that the area is inhabited since the antiquity. There are a number of Thracian votive tiles discovered, the oldest one dated to the 3rd-2nd century BC depicting a horseman. Due to this it is believed that the site has been a place of worship long before the establishment of Basarbovo Monastery.

Its earliest mention is from 1431 in an Ottoman tax register. According to it, there were 14 households in the village with predominantly ethnic Bulgarian population.

During the Ottoman rule in Bulgaria, the village was located on the hill northwest of its current position. After it was burnt down several times, in 1803 the settlement moved to its current position.

=== Name ===
In its earliest mentions, the village is indicated as Monastery Basaraba (Bulgarian: Манастир "Басараба"), evolving later on in Basarbovo.

It is hypothesized that it is called after Basarab I of Wallachia, as it may have been in his land. Another theory is that it was founded by settlers from Bessarabia, although this is disputed as there is evidence for the village being founded by settlers from the Balkan village Dryanovo.

== Main sights ==
=== Basarbovo Monastery ===
Basarbovo Monastery is located in walking distance from Basarbovo. It was founded during the Second Bulgarian Empire (XII-XIV cent.), but the oldest written mention of it dates to 1431 in an Ottoman tax register. It is the only active cave monastery in the modern history of Bulgaria. It was named a historical landmark in 1978.

== Others ==
Basarbovo Ridge in Antarctica is named after the village.
