= Arnold of Arnoldsweiler =

Catholic saint and musician in the 8th century

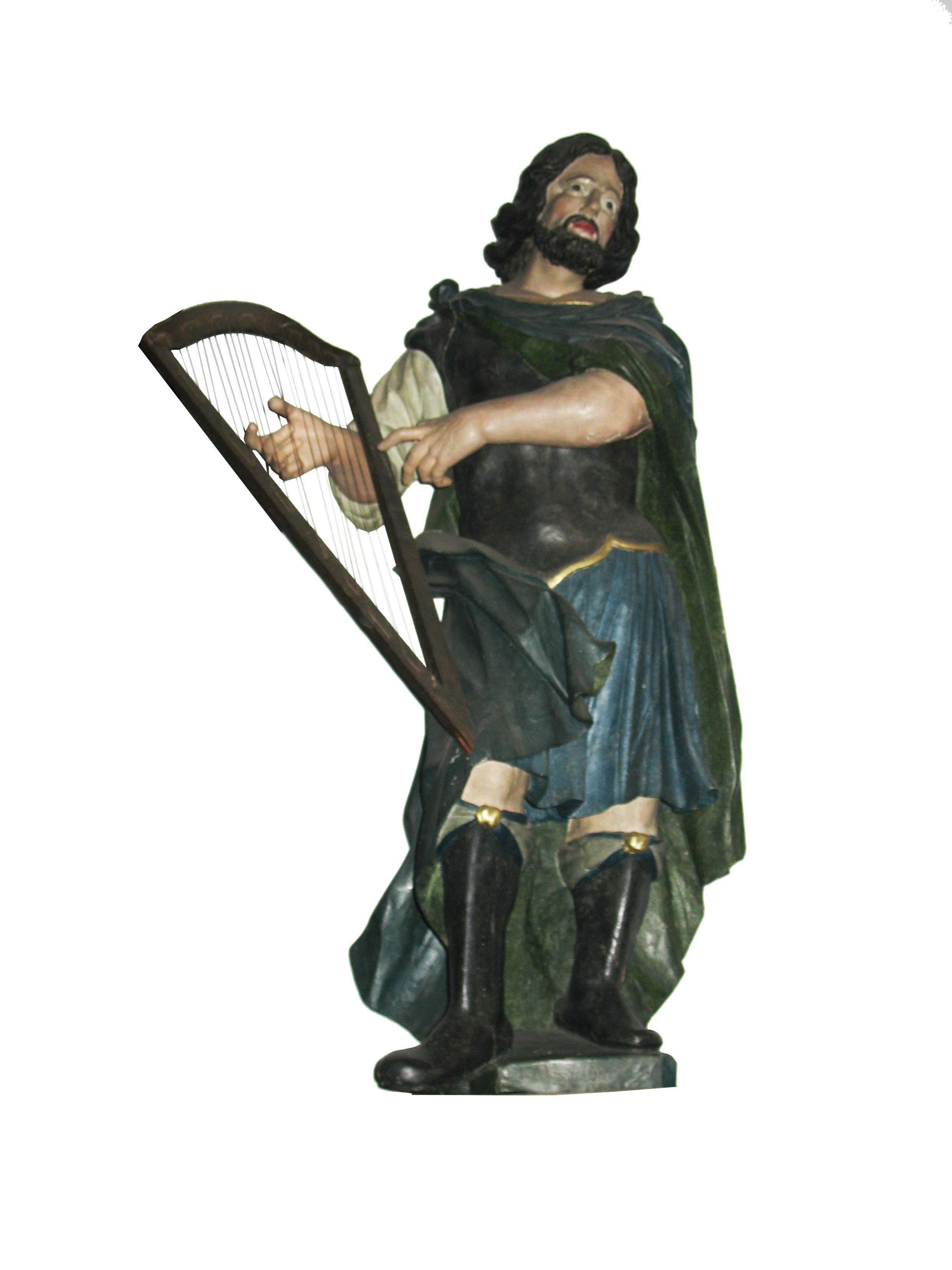
- Figure of Saint Arnold (18th c.) in Arnoldsweiler.
- Born: 8th century Graecia or Graetia or Raetia
- Died: 8th century Ginnizweiler=Arnoldsweiler
- Venerated in: Roman Catholic Church, Orthodox Church, True Orthodox Church
- Canonized: 1886 by Pope Leo XIII
- Major shrine: St. Arnold's Chapel in Arnoldsweiler
- Feast: 18 July
- Attributes: As a musician with a harp
- Patronage: musicians, organists, makers of musical instruments. Good and gentle death.

Arnold of Arnoldsweiler (German: Arnold von Arnoldsweiler) (died c. 800 in Ginnizweiler, today Düren-Arnoldsweiler) is a saint of the Roman Catholic Church, Orthodox Church and True Orthodox Church and was a musician (harpist and singer) at the court of Emperor Charles the Great, known as Charlemagne. His feast day is 18 July.

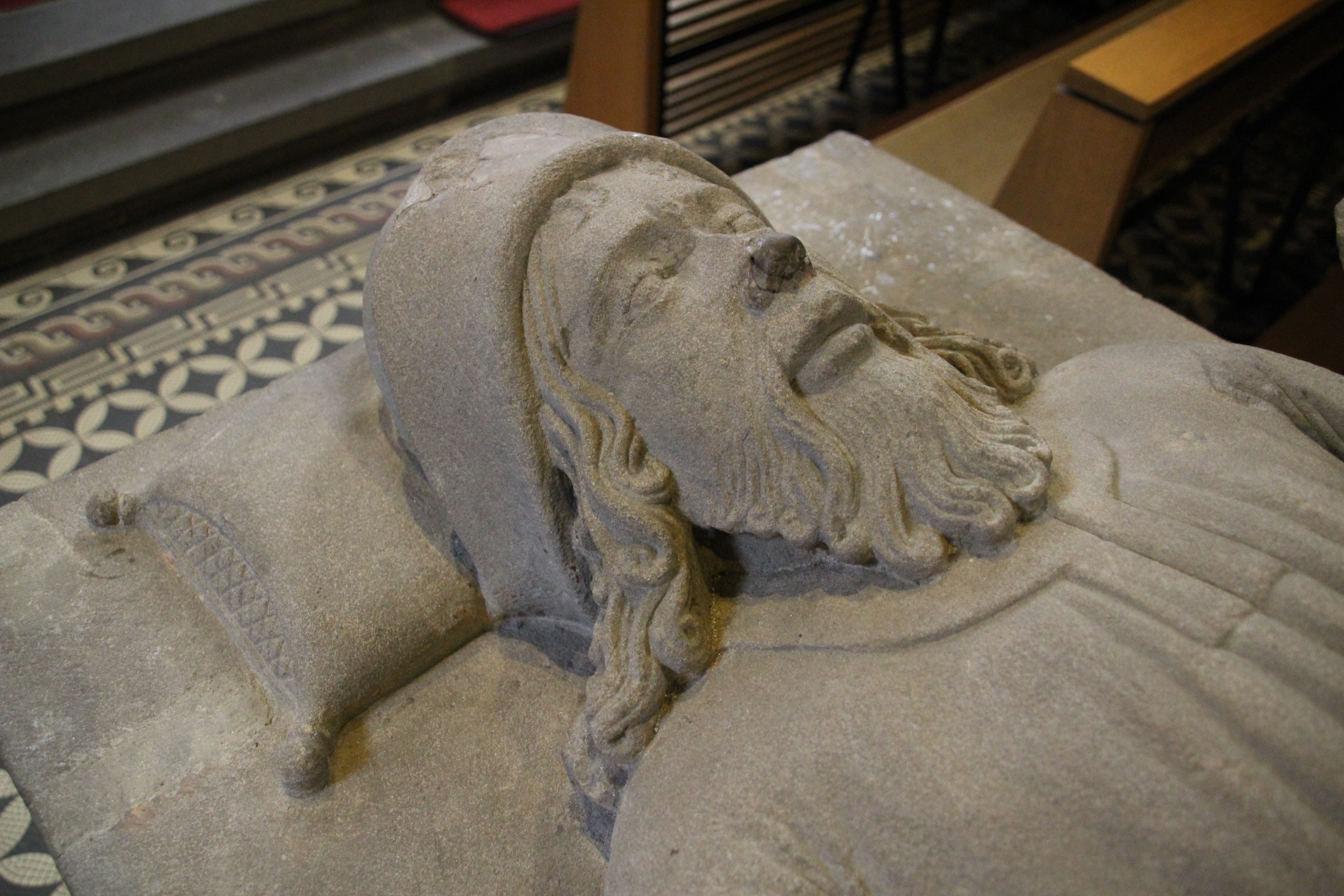
partial view of the sarcophagus with the saint's oldest image

== Biography ==
Neither his exact year of birth nor his birthplace are known. Some sources maintain he came from Greece (Latin: Graecia); others suggest that in the oldest extant copy of the Latin Vita Sancti Arnoldi Confessoris a spelling mistake occurred: rather than Greece, the Latin name for the Austrian town of Graz (Graetia) was implied. Jacob Schmid, who had published an extensive collection of saint legends in the 18th century, including the Legend of Arnoldus, also questioned Arnold's Greek origins and suggested instead that he came from Raetia, an ancient Roman province reaching from the north of present-day Italy to the south of present-day Switzerland.

Arnold died probably around 800 in Ginizuuilere (=Ginizwilere=Ginnizweiler, later renamed Arnoldsweiler), where he was buried. His grave is still revered there today in St. Arnold's Chapel. In an imprint of the Acta Sanctorum of the Bollandists from 1725, the death of Arnold was assumed to have occurred at the beginning of the 9th century; in Stadler's Complete Lexikon of Saints of 1840 it is restated that he died around 800. Arnold Steffens in 1886 sets the death date to 843, similar to the Bollandists. Rudolf Wyrsch in 1994 again places it around 800. The 21st century scholar Wilhelm Arnolds professes the year of St. Arnold's death to be 793.

== Recognition ==
Between 922 and 1168, his death and burial place was renamed after his name into Arnoldsweiler (wilre sancti Arnoldi), which today forms a district of Düren. Arnold has been revered as a people's saint at least since that time and is considered the patron saint of musicians, organists, and makers of musical instruments, and to pray for a good and gentle death. In addition to a document from 1339, there only is an express earliest mention of his person in the transcript of his Vita, so only about 500 years after his death. Because of this, at times even the legitimacy of his veneration as a saint was doubted. In 1886, Pope Leo XIII recognized the cult for the Archdiocese of Cologne and confirmed the then about 1000 years old tradition. In 1914, the festival on Saint Arnold's Day, 18 July, was classified as a memorial day. Since 1987 it has been recognized as optional memorial for the Roman Catholic Diocese of Aachen. He is recognised by the Orthodox Church as saint.

== Life and legends ==
The Vita Sancti Arnoldi Confessoris was not only copied, but also translated and retold. As little documentary evidence exists in writing, it cannot be determined with certainty how far Saint Arnold's biography is based on real facts, or if with the passage of time it was interlaced with legends.

=== The ride around the Bürgewald ===
Arnold accompanied Emperor Charlemagne and his entourage on hunts in the Bürgewald (a forest area north of Düren between Aachen and Cologne, bordered by the rivers Rur and Erft). One day the king decided to hold a banquet in the forest. Arnold saw the poverty of the villagers when they approached to ask for firewood, stating that the forest was royal property and they did not dare to take anything from the forest floor.

Arnold challenged the emperor in a bet to give him as much forest land as he could circle on horseback while the banquet lasted. The wish was granted to him. The crafty Arnold arranged for fresh horses in the surrounding villages and managed to circumnavigate the entire forest before the meal was over.

Charlemagne was fond of Arnold and forgave him the ruse, which exploited his by nature generous disposition. He gave Arnold a ring to testify that the forest henceforth belonged to him. Arnold distributed the Bürgewald territory amongst the surrounding villages. This good deed of his led to his being worshiped as a saint. For centuries, the forest was used by the adjacent villages.

In one extension of the legend one of the horses was exhausted and a maid refused to give it water. The horse then scraped the ground with its hoof and a spring of water arose that still bears the name Arnolduspötzsche (Arnoldusquelle/Saint Arnold Fountain) today. The woman refusing to share water is said to have been from the village of Huchem-Stammeln (today in the municipality of Niederzier). This village was excluded from the right to use the forest and its name is missing from the stone tablet in Saint Arnold's Chapel, where 15 of the villages grateful to Saint Arnold are listed.

=== The pilgrimage to Santiago de Compostela ===
Arnold's documented pilgrimage to the tomb of the apostle James the Great in Santiago de Compostela, Spain is embellished by another tale:

In southern France the aged Arnold came to an area where it had not rained for weeks and the residents were starving. Arnold decided to stop and help alleviate the misery of the people. His own strength began to subside, and, feeling close to death, he wished to die in his homeland. He prayed to God for a sign he received in a dream. Arnold then threw the ring Charlemagne had given him into the Garonne. The reappearance of the ring would alert him to his imminent death. On his journey home north to the Rhineland, he rested for a time at a pious widow's house. One day he gave alms to the poor in the village and they brought their benefactor a fish from the market that had swallowed a ring. Arnold recognized his ring, thanked God for the miracle and resumed his journey home. He reached the village Ginnizweiler and died soon afterwards.

== Patron saint to Arnold Janssen ==
Saint Arnold of Arnoldsweiler is the patron saint of Father Arnold Janssen, the founder of the Steyl missionaries (Societas Verbi Divini). Arnold Janssen was canonized on 5 October 2003. The Mission House St. Arnold was founded by the Steyl missionaries in 1928 in Neuenkirchen (Steinfurt district). The nearby train station of Neuenkirchen was renamed in 1931 to St. Arnold station and the surrounding quarter became officially known as St. Arnold.
