= Sary Sehnaoui =

Lebanese-Canadian film director and music producer

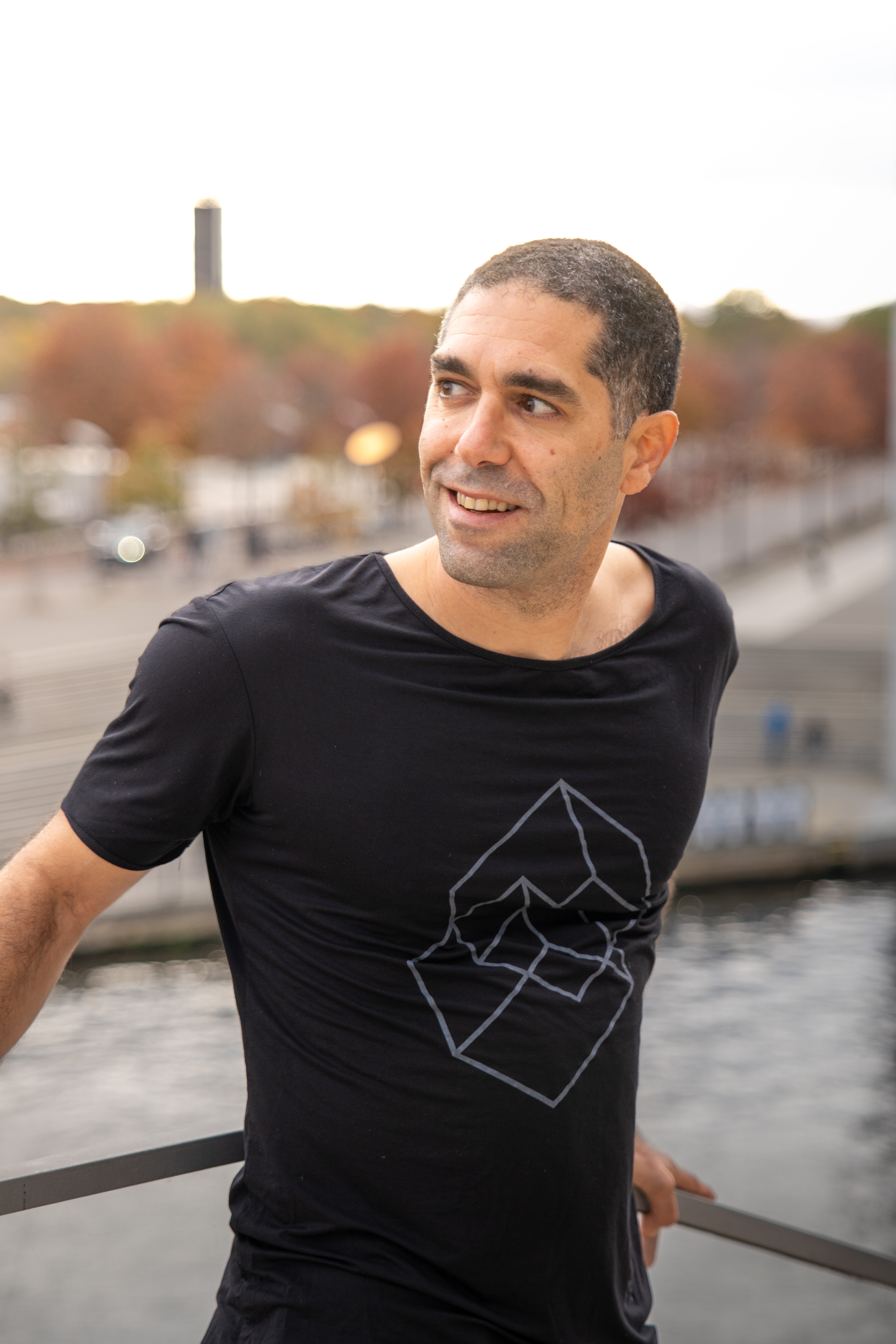
- HEAR in 2025

Background information
- Born: Sary Gabriel Sehnaoui Beirut, Lebanon
- Genres: electronic music; house; techno
- Occupations: filmmaker; DJ; record producer; composer
- Instrument: oud
- Works: The Basement, Beirut
- Years active: 2002–present
- Label: Naissance Musik
- Member of: Dream Scoring; Quarter Tones

Sary Gabriel Sehnaoui, known professionally as HEAR, is a Lebanese-Canadian film director, DJ, and electronic music producer based in Berlin.

Sehnaoui directed the 2009 short video The Basement, Beirut, which has been discussed in academic writing on post-war Lebanese youth culture. As a musician, he has recorded with Move D and San Proper, and founded the Berlin electronic music label Naissance Musik in 2016. His collaborative projects include Dream Scoring with Hakim Murphy and Quarter Tones with Henrik Raabe of the Wareika band.

== Early life and education ==
Sehnaoui was born in Beirut and studied fine arts in Canada, specialising in audiovisual production. He began DJ-ing in 2002, initially as a hobby, and adopted the name HEAR in 2003, moving progressively into music production. He later settled in Berlin.

== Film work ==
In 2005-2006, Sehnaoui directed music videos for tracks by Lebanese electro-rock band Lumi, "Concert at the Basement" and "Don't F*** With My Cat".

In 2009, Sehnaoui directed The Basement, Beirut, a short video commercial shown in the Viral Video Award programme at Interfilm Berlin. The video is discussed in the edited volume Arab Youth: Social Mobilisation in Times of Risk, which describes a couple leaving The Basement nightclub, finding a devastated Beirut outside and returning downstairs to continue drinking and dancing, above the closing line "It's safer underground". The book treats it as an example of escapism and hedonism in post-war Lebanon.

== Music career ==
Sehnaoui has performed internationally and across clubs and festivals in Berlin, Beirut and Montreal, such as Piknic Électronik, Igloofest, and MUTEK in 2013.

In 2013, HEAR released the album Sonic Limbo on Archipel Musique and the Distant Voices EP with German producer Move D, also on Archipel Musique. Resident Advisor linked the EP's atmospheric sound to his work as a film director.

In 2017, HEAR and Dutch producer San Proper released the EP Elephantoms on Naissance Musik, accompanied by a vinyl distribution. The track "The Groin" was accompanied by a video directed by Lebanese filmmaker Hany Tamba.

=== Naissance Musik ===
In 2016, Sehnaoui founded the electronic music label Naissance Musik. In 2019, Naissance Musik held two showcases in Germany and its first visit to Beirut, accompanied by local DJs and the German trio Wareika.

Following the Beirut port explosion, Sehnaoui organised the #TalkAboutBeirut initiative through the label at Club der Visionaere in Berlin, bringing artistic awareness to the situation, with a live oud performance by Henrik Raabe.

=== Dream Scoring ===
Dream Scoring is a collaboration between HEAR and Chicago producer Hakim Murphy, which released Images of a Myth on Naissance Musik in 2016.

=== Quarter Tones ===
Quarter Tones is a duo of HEAR and Henrik Raabe of Wareika, combining electronic production with Arabic motives and the oud sound. For Silk Road Chronicles (Vol. 1), released on Naissance Musik in 2024, the pair worked with Lebanese luthier Fadi Matta on an oud capable of musically leading modular synthesizers, with work taking place across Beirut, Bingen and Berlin.

== Musical style ==
HEAR's work incorporates electronic, house, techno, experimental and cinematic elements. A 2019 article in HuffPost Greece on the meeting of Arabic and Western electronic music noted him combining the oud with Arabic vocals. His work with Move D was characterised by Resident Advisor through atmospheric and cinematic soundscapes, while Igloo Magazine described Dream Scoring's music as deep, warm, analogue and organic.

The combination of electronic music and Arabic musical traditions later became central to Quarter Tones, particularly through the use of the oud alongside modular synthesisers.

== Selected discography ==
=== As HEAR ===
- Sonic Limbo album (2013, Archipel Musique)
- Distant Voices EP with Move D (2013, Archipel)
- Elephantoms EP with San Proper (2017, Naissance Musik)
- Interconnections EP (2022, Naissance Musik)

=== As Dream Scoring ===
- Images of a Myth with Hakim Murphy (2016, Naissance Musik)
- Cinematic Panoramas EP with Hakim Murphy (2022, Synapsis Records)

=== As Quarter Tones ===
- Silk Road Chronicles (Vol. 1) with Henrik Raabe (2024, Naissance Musik)
