= Hearing (disambiguation) =

Hearing is the ability to perceive sounds through an organ, such as an ear, by detecting vibrations.

Hearing or The Hearing may also refer to:

- Hearing (law), a formal examination of a case before a judge or other decision-making body
  - Preliminary hearing
  - United States congressional hearing
- "The Hearing", an episode of Dynasty (1981 TV series) season 2
- "The Hearing", a two-part episode of Dynasty (1981 TV series) season 4
- Hearing (film), a 2026 film by Lê Bảo
- The Hearing (film), a 2024 Filipino film

== See also ==
- Hear (disambiguation)
- Deaf culture
- Hearing loss
- Occasional hearing, attending worship services or preaching by ministers of denominations other than one's own
