= Here =

Here may refer to:

== Music ==
- Here (Adrian Belew album), 1994
- Here (Alicia Keys album), 2016
- Here (Cal Tjader album), 1979
- Here (Edward Sharpe album), 2012
- Here (Idina Menzel album), 2004
- Here (Merzbow album), 2008
- Here (Nicolay album), 2006
- Here (Leo Sayer album), 1979
- Here (Teenage Fanclub album), 2016
- "Here" (Alessia Cara song), 2015
- "Here" (The Grace song), 2008
- "Here" (Rascal Flatts song), 2008
- "Here" (Tom Grennan song), 2023
- "Here" (1954 song), song with music by Harold Grant and lyrics by Dorcas Cochran
- Here (Cartoon song), 2016
- "Here (In Your Arms)", 2006 song by Hellogoodbye
- "Here", a 1971 song by America from their eponymous debut album
- "Here", a 2014 song by Christine and the Queens from Chaleur humaine
- "Here", a 2018 song by David Byrne from American Utopia
- "Here", a 1995 song by Luscious Jackson from Natural Ingredients
- "Here", a 1992 song by Pavement from Slanted and Enchanted
- "Here", a 2018 song by Sasha Alex Sloan from Sad Girl

== Film and television ==
- Here (2003 film) (Tu), a Croatian film directed by Zrinko Ogresta
- Here (2009 film), a Singaporean film directed by Tzu Nyen Ho
- Here (2011 film), an American drama directed by Braden King
- Here (2023 film), a Belgian film directed by Bas Devos
- Here (2024 film), an American drama directed by Robert Zemeckis
- Here TV (formerly "here!"), a TV network
- "Here" (2019), first episode of Green Eggs and Ham (TV series)

== Food ==
- Here (grape), another name for the French wine grape Fer
  - Gros Verdot, another French wine grape that is also known as Hère
  - Béquignol noir, another French wine grape that is also known as Here's

== Other ==
- Here, an Old English name for an invading army or raiding party containing more than thirty-five men
- Here (comics), published in the magazine RAW
- "Here", a poem by Philip Larkin
- Here (play), by Michael Frayn
- Here, Prozor, a village in Bosnia and Herzegovina
- HERE Arts Center, New York City off-off-Broadway organization
- Hotel Employees and Restaurant Employees Union, a US labor union representing workers of the hospitality industry
- Here Technologies, a mapping company
  - Here WeGo (formerly Here Maps), a mobile app and map website by Here Technologies
- Here (sculpture), a 2013 artwork by Thomson & Craighead

== See also ==
- Deixis
- Hear (disambiguation)
- Hera, a Greek goddess whose name is sometimes spelled Hērē
- Here document
- Here and Now (disambiguation)
- Metaphysics of presence
