= Procopius of Scythopolis =

4th-century Christian martyr

Saint Procopius of Scythopolis
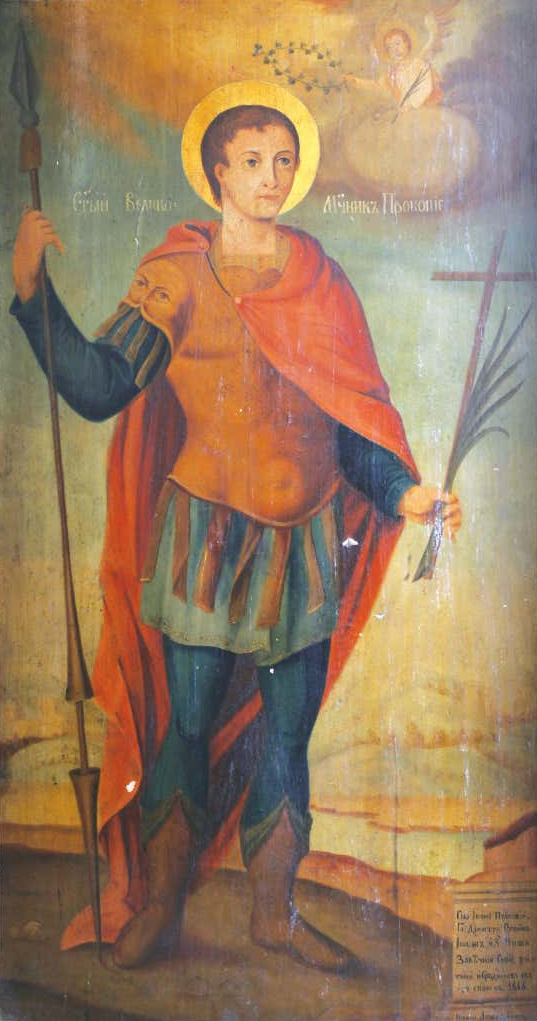
- Icon of Saint Procopius, 1816; Niš, Serbia

Great Martyr
- Born: 3rd century Jerusalem
- Died: 7 July 303; Caesarea Maritima
- Venerated in: Roman Catholicism; Eastern Orthodoxy; Oriental Orthodoxy; Lutheranism; Anglicanism
- Feast: 8 July; 22 November Eastern Orthodox

Procopius of Scythopolis (Greek: Προκόπιος ὁ Σκυθοπολίτης; died 7 July 303) was a 4th century martyr who is venerated as a saint. He was a reader and exorcist in the church at Scythopolis; he also was famous as an ascetic and erudite theologian. Eusebius of Caesarea wrote of his martyrdom, which occurred during the persecution of Roman Emperor Diocletian, and stated that "he was born at Jerusalem, but had gone to live in Scythopolis, where he held three ecclesiastical offices. He was reader and interpreter in the Syriac language, and cured those possessed of evil spirits." Eusebius wrote that Procopius was sent with his companions from Scythopolis to Caesarea Maritima, where he was decapitated.

== Accounts ==
Eusebius's account of Procopius's martyrdom also exists in medieval Syriac, Georgian, and Latin translations. Later legendary and contradictory accounts claimed that he was either a soldier saint, ascetic, a Persian, or prince of Alexandria. One myth claimed that he slew around 6,000 barbarian invaders simply by showing them the cross. In another account, clearly borrowed from the life of the Apostle St. Paul of Tarsus, Neanias (as was his original name) was a persecutor of Christians. The Roman Emperor Diocletian appointed him duke of Alexandria but on the way from Antioch, Neanias experienced a vision and declared himself a Christian. He was betrayed by his mother and was imprisoned, tortured and beheaded but not before having another vision and receiving his new name Procopius.

== Veneration ==
In Western Europe, Procopius was first enumerated in the calendar of saints by St. Bede, whose Martyrology listed the saint under 8 July. His name and date were added to the Roman Martyrology.

In Scythopolis a chapel was dedicated in his honor. In Caesarea Maritima Roman Emperor Zeno erected a church dedicated in his honor in AD 484. His relics were translated to the Church of Saint Michael in Antioch, Syria. In Constantinople 4 churches were dedicated in his honor. He is the patron saint of Prokuplje, Serbia.

In the Eastern Orthodox Church, he is remembered in the marriage dismissal.

== See also ==
- Cyril of Scythopolis
