= Arnoldsweiler =

- Ortsteil of Düren
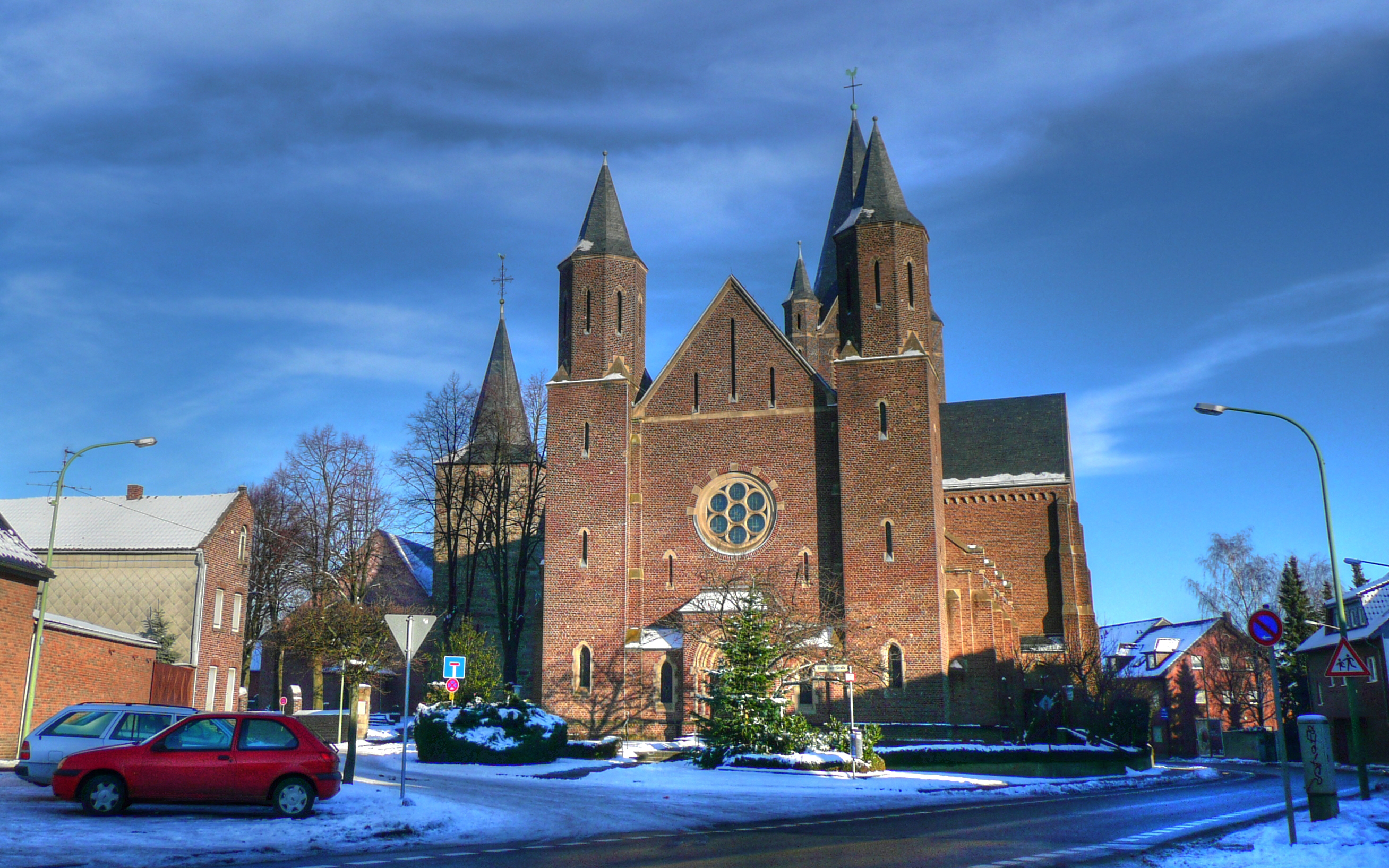
- Church of Saint Arnold

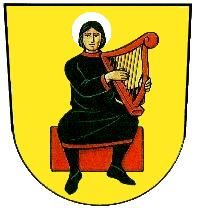
- Coat of arms
- Interactive map of Arnoldsweiler
- Location within Germany Location within North Rhine-Westphalia
- Coordinates: 50°50′17″N 6°29′27″E
- Country: Germany
- State: North Rhine-Westphalia
- District: Düren
- Town: Düren

Area
  - Total: 9.51 km^{2} (3.67 sq mi)
- Elevation: 118 m (387 ft)

Population (2017-12-31)
  - Total: 3,185
  - Density: 335/km^{2} (867/sq mi)
- Time zone: UTC+01:00 (CET)
  - Summer (DST): UTC+02:00 (CEST)
- Postal codes: 52353
- Dialling codes: 02421

Arnoldsweiler is a village in Nordrhein-Westfalen, Germany. It is part of the town Düren, situated between Cologne and Aachen. Its population was 3,185 in 2017.

== History ==
The village is named after the late 8th century AD Saint Arnold of Arnoldsweiler, a charitable Greek musician at the court of Charlemagne.
