= Targovishte Province =

Province in northeastern Bulgaria

Coordinates: 43°15′N 26°30′E

Targovishte Province Област Търговище
- Province
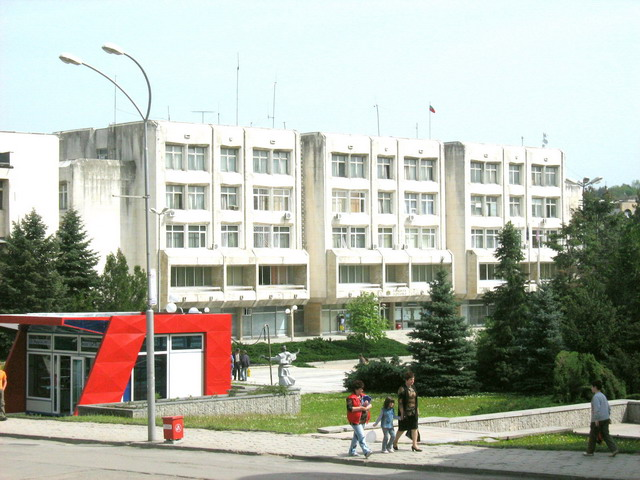
- Popovo City Hall

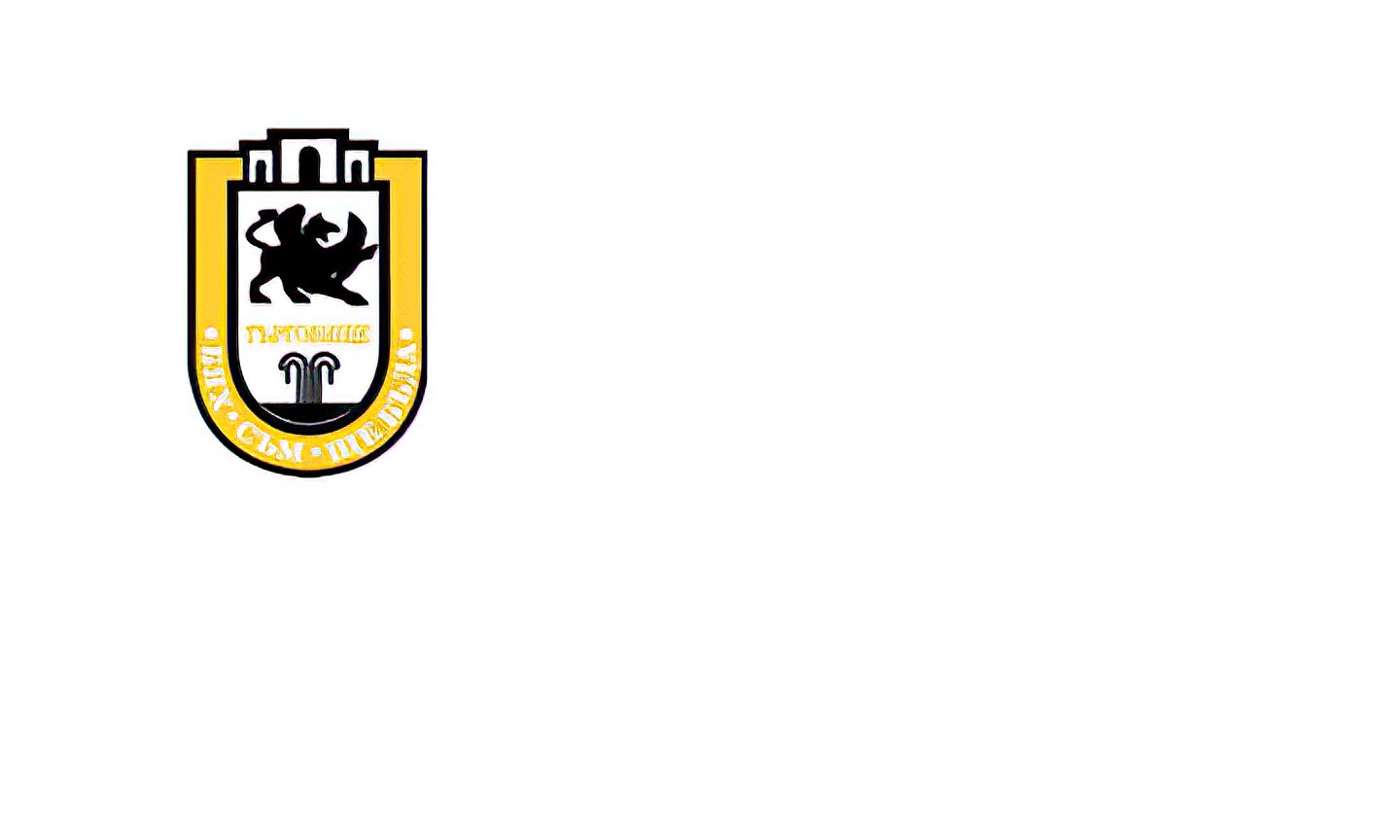
- Flag

- Location of Targovishte Province in Bulgaria
- Country: Bulgaria
- Capital: Targovishte
- Municipalities: 5

Area
  - Total: 2,558.5 km^{2} (987.8 sq mi)

Population (December 2022)
  - Total: 96,201
  - Density: 37.601/km^{2} (97.385/sq mi)
- Time zone: UTC+2 (EET)
  - Summer (DST): UTC+3 (EEST)
- License plate: T
- Website: tg.government.bg

Targovishte Province (Bulgarian: Област Търговище, transliterated Oblast Tǎrgovište, former name Targovishte okrug) is a province in northeastern Bulgaria, named after its main city - Targovishte. As of December 2009, it had a population of 129,675.

== Municipalities ==
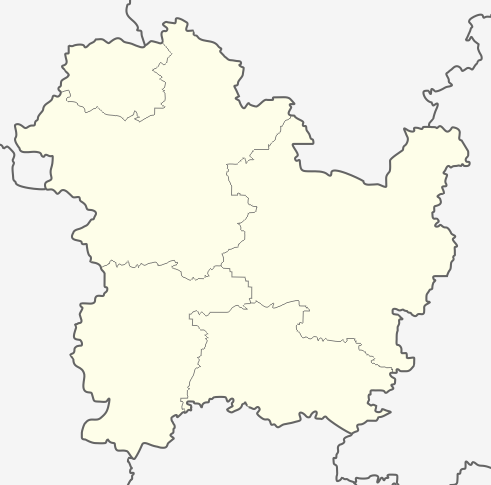

The Targovishte Province contains 5 municipalities (singular: община, obshtina - plural: общини, obshtini). The following table shows the names of each municipality in English and Cyrillic, the main town (in bold) or village, and the population of each as of December 2009.

Municipality	Cyrillic	Area (km^{2})	Pop.	Town/Village	Pop.
Targovishte	Търговище	872	60,497	**Targovishte**	37,375
Popovo	Попово	833	31,479	**Popovo**	15,548
Omurtag	Омуртаг	401	24,256	**Omurtag**	8,725
Antonovo	Антоново	472	6,507	**Antonovo**	1,453
Opaka	Опака	156	6,936	**Opaka**	2,873

== Demographics ==
Historical population
Year	Pop.	±%
1946	184,641	—
1956	172,401	−6.6%
1965	177,668	+3.1%
1975	178,656	+0.6%
1985	171,311	−4.1%
1992	156,006	−8.9%
2001	141,844	−9.1%
2011	120,818	−14.8%
2021	98,144	−18.8%
Source: pop-stat.mashke.org

The Targovishte province had a population of 137,689 according to a 2001 census, of which 49.2% were male and 50.8% were female.

As of the end of 2009, the population of the province, announced by the Bulgarian National Statistical Institute, numbered 129,675 of which 24.1% are inhabitants aged over 60 years.

=== Ethnic groups ===
Ethnic groups in Targovishte Province (2011 census)
Ethnic group	Percentage
Bulgarians	54.6%
Turks	35.8%
Romani	7.3%
others and indefinable	2.3%

Total population (2011 census): 120,818

Ethnic groups (2011 census): Identified themselves: 106,800 persons:

- Bulgarians: 58,371 (54.65%)
- Turks: 38,231 (35.80%)
- Romani: 7,767 (7.27%)
- Others and indefinable: 2,431 (2.28%)

A further 14,000 persons in Targovishte Province did not declare their ethnic group at the 2011 census.

=== Religion ===
Religions in Targovishte Province (2001 census)
Religious group	Percentage
Orthodox Christian	54.6%
Muslim	42.7%
Roman Catholic Christian	0.2%
Protestant Christian	0.1%
others and indefinable	2.4%

Religious adherence in the province according to 2001 census:

Census 2001
religious adherence	population	%
Orthodox Christians	75,236	54.64%
Muslims	58,838	42.73%
Roman Catholics	271	0.20%
Protestants	84	0.07%
Other	527	0.38%
Religion not mentioned	2,733	1.98%
**total**	**137,689**	100%

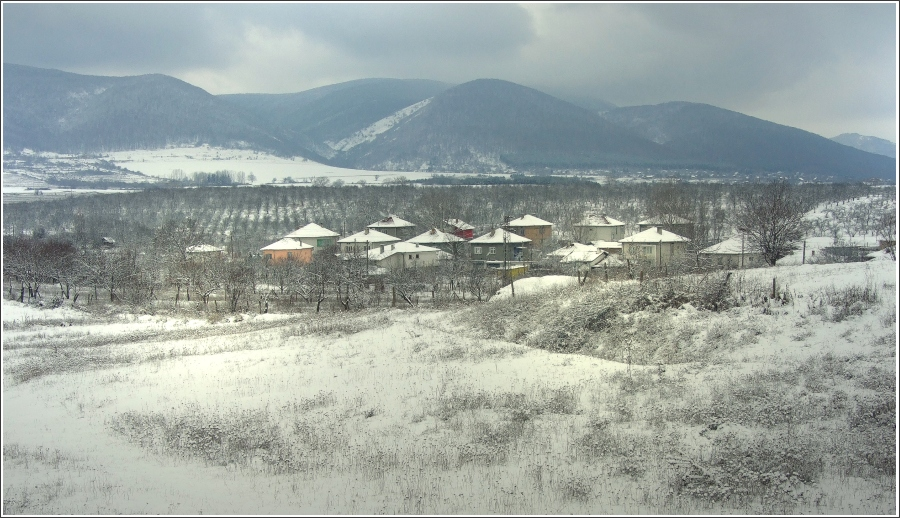
Winter view of Razboyna village with the Preslav Mountains in the background

== Technical Infrastructure ==
The length of the road network is 1,171.3 km, 77.6 km of which are first class roads. There are two railway stations on the major railway line Sofia- Gorna Oryahovitsa - Varna.

Targovishte Airport is located 13 km (8.1 mi) from the city of Targovishte. However, it is not being used because of a lack of financial resources.

== Towns and villages ==
The place names in bold have the status of town (in Bulgarian: град, transliterated as grad). Other localities have the status of village (in Bulgarian: село, transliterated as selo). The names of localities are transliterated in Latin alphabet followed in parentheses by the original name in Bulgarian Cyrillic script (which links to the corresponding Bulgarian Wikipedia article).

=== Antonovo municipality ===
The Antonovo municipality has one town (in bold) and 56 villages:

- **Antonovo** (Антоново)
- Bankovets (Банковец)
- Bogomolsko (Богомолско)
- Bukak (Букак)
- Velikovtsi (Великовци)
- Velyovo (Вельово)
- Glashatay (Глашатай)
- Golyamo Dolyane (Голямо Доляне)
- Gorna Zlatitsa (Горна Златица)
- Devino (Девино)
- Dlazhka polyana (Длъжка поляна)
- Dobrotitsa (Добротица)
- Dolna Zlatitsa (Долна Златица)
- Dabravitsa (Дъбравица)
- Izvorovo (Изворово)
- Kapishte (Капище)
- Kitino (Китино)
- Konop (Коноп)
- Kraypole (Крайполе)
- Krusholak (Крушолак)
- Kapinets (Къпинец)
- Kyosevtsi (Кьосевци)
- Lyubichevo (Любичево)
- Malka Cherkovna (Малка Черковна)
- Malogradets (Малоградец)
- Manushevtsi (Манушевци)
- Mechovo (Мечово)
- Milino (Милино)
- Moravitsa (Моравица)
- Moravka (Моравка)
- Orach (Орач)
- Pirinets (Пиринец)
- Poroyno (Поройно)
- Prisoyna (Присойна)
- Pchelno (Пчелно)
- Ravno selo (Равно село)
- Razdeltsi (Разделци)
- Svirchovo (Свирчово)
- Svoboditsa (Свободица)
- Semertsi (Семерци)
- Slanchovets (Слънчовец)
- Stara rechka (Стара речка)
- Starchishte (Старчище)
- Stevrek (Стеврек)
- Stoynovo (Стойново)
- Stroynovtsi (Стройновци)
- Taymishte (Таймище)
- Tihovets (Тиховец)
- Treskavets (Трескавец)
- Halvadzhiysko (Халваджийско)
- Chekantsi (Чеканци)
- Cherna voda (Черна вода)
- Cherni bryag (Черни бряг)
- Shishkovitsa (Шишковица)
- Yazovets (Язовец)
- Yarebichno (Яребично)
- Yastrebino (Ястребино)

=== Omurtag municipality ===
The Omurtag municipality has one town (in bold) and 41 villages:

- Belomortsi (Беломорци)
- Balgaranovo (Българаново)
- Velikdenche (Великденче)
- Velichka (Величка)
- Verentsi (Веренци)
- Veselets (Веселец)
- Visok (Висок)
- Vrani kon (Врани кон)
- Golyamo Tsarkvishte (Голямо Църквище)
- Gorna Hubavka (Горна Хубавка)
- Gorno Kozarevo (Горно Козарево)
- Gorno Novkovo (Горно Новково)
- Gorsko selo (Горско село)
- Dolna Hubavka (Долна Хубавка)
- Dolno Kozarevo (Долно Козарево)
- Dolno Novkovo (Долно Новково)
- Zelena morava (Зелена морава)
- Zmeyno (Змейно)
- Zvezditsa (Звездица)
- Iliyno (Илийно)
- Kamburovo (Камбурово)
- Kestenovo (Кестеново)
- Kozma Prezviter (Козма Презвитер)
- Krasnoseltsi (Красноселци)
- Mogilets (Могилец)
- Obitel (Обител)
- **Omurtag** (Омуртаг)
- Panayot Hitovo (Панайот Хитово)
- Panichino (Паничино)
- Petrino (Петрино)
- Plastina (Плъстина)
- Ptichevo (Птичево)
- Padarino (Пъдарино)
- Parvan (Първан)
- Rositsa (Росица)
- Ratlina (Рътлина)
- Stanets (Станец)
- Tapchileshtovo (Тъпчилещово)
- Tsarevtsi (Царевци)
- Tserovishte (Церовище)
- Chernokaptsi (Чернокапци)

=== Opaka municipality ===
The Opaka municipality has one town (in bold) and 5 villages:

- Golyamo Gradishte (Голямо Градище)
- Gorsko Ablanovo (Горско Абланово)
- Garchinovo (Гърчиново)
- Krepcha (Крепча)
- Lyublen (Люблен)
- **Opaka** (Опака)

=== Popovo municipality ===
The Popovo municipality has one town (in bold) and 34 villages:

- Aprilovo (Априлово)
- Baba Tonka (Баба Тонка)
- Berkovski (Берковски)
- Braknitsa (Бракница)
- Voditsa (Водица)
- Gagovo (Гагово)
- Gloginka (Глогинка)
- Goritsa (Горица)
- Dolets (Долец)
- Dolna Kabda (Долна Кабда)
- Drinovo (Дриново)
- Elenovo (Еленово)
- Zavetno (Заветно)
- Zarevo (Зараево)
- Zahari Stoyanovo (Захари Стояново)
- Zvezda (Звезда)
- Ivancha (Иванча)
- Kardam (Кардам)
- Kovachevets (Ковачевец)
- Kozitsa (Козица)
- Konak (Конак)
- Lomtsi (Ломци)
- Manastiritsa (Манастирица)
- Marchino (Марчино)
- Medovina (Медовина)
- Osikovo (Осиково)
- Palamartsa (Паламарца)
- Pomoshtitsa (Помощица)
- **Popovo** (Попово)
- Posabina (Посабина)
- Sadina (Садина)
- Svetlen (Светлен)
- Slavyanovo (Славяново)
- Trastika (Тръстика)
- Tsar Asen (Цар Асен)

=== Targovishte municipality ===
The Targovishte municipality has one town (in bold) and 51 villages:

- Aleksandrovo (Александрово)
- Alvanovo (Алваново)
- Bayachevo (Баячево)
- Bistra (Бистра)
- Bojurka (Божурка)
- Bratovo (Братово)
- Buhovtsi (Буховци)
- Buynovo (Буйново)
- Cherkovna (Черковна)
- Dalgach (Дългач)
- Davidovo (Давидово)
- Draganovets (Драгановец)
- Dralfa (Дралфа)
- Golyamo Sokolovo (Голямо Соколово)
- Golyamo novo (Голямо Ново)
- Gorna Kabda (Горна Кабда)
- Koprets (Копрец)
- Koshnichari (Кошничари)
- Kralevo (Кралево)
- Krashno (Кръшно)
- Lilyak (Лиляк)
- Lovets (Ловец)
- Makariopolsko (Макариополско)
- Makovo (Маково)
- Miladinovtsi (Миладиновци)
- Mirovets (Мировец)
- Momino (Момино)
- Nadarevo (Надарево)
- Osen (Осен)
- Ostrets (Острец)
- Ovcharovo (Овчарово)
- Paydushko (Пайдушко)
- Pevets (Певец)
- Podgoritsa (Подгорица)
- Preselets (Преселец)
- Presian (Пресиян)
- Presyak (Пресяк)
- Probuda (Пробуда)
- Prolaz (Пролаз)
- Ralitsa (Ралица)
- Razboyna (Разбойна)
- Rosina (Росина)
- Ruets (Руец)
- Saedinenie (Съединение)
- Strazha (Стража)
- **Targovishte** (Търговище)
- Tarnovtsa (Търновца)
- Tsvetnitsa (Цветница)
- Tvardintsi (Твърдинци)
- Vardun (Вардун)
- Vasil Levski (Васил Левски)
- Zdravets (Здравец)

== See also ==
- Provinces of Bulgaria
- List of villages in Targovishte Province
