= II-51 road (Bulgaria) =

Road in Bulgaria

Republic Road I-51
- Републикански път I-51

Route information
- Length: 98.2 km (61.0 mi)

Major junctions
- From: Km 51.8 of I-5, Byala
- To: Km 95.5 of I-2

Location
- Country: Bulgaria
- Towns: Byala, Popovo, Loznitsa

Highway system
- Highways in Bulgaria

Republican Road II-51 (Bulgarian: Републикански път II-51) is a second-class road in northeastern Bulgaria, running through Ruse, Targovishte and Razgrad Provinces. Its length is 98.2 km.

== Route description ==
The road starts at Km 51.8 of the first class I-5 road in the northern outskirts of the town of Byala, passes through the town's center and heads east through the eastern section of the Danubian Plain. It ascends the low watershed between the rivers Yantra and Rusenski Lom, and at the village of Koprivets it enters the valley of the Baniski Lom, a left tributary of the Cherni Lom. From there the road ascend the valley of the river Kayadzhik, a left tributary of the Baniski Lom, in direction southeast, and at the village of Lom Cherkovna turns east and enters Targovishte Province.

It bypasses the Popovo Heights from the southwest and south, goes through the villages of Voditsa and Kovachevets and through the valley of the Popovski Lom reaches the town of Popovo. The II-51 bypasses the town from the south and continues in direction southeast, passing through the village of Svetlen and crossing the river Cherni Lom, after which it turns east. At Golyamo Novo it passes through a low watershed and descend to the valley of Kerizbunas of the Golyama Kamchiya basin, reaching the village of Dralfa, where it forms and intersection with the terminus of the second class II-74 road and in 3 km enters Razgrad Province. There, the road passes through the village of Chudomir and the northern outskirts of the town of Loznitsa and in 5 km from there enters again Targovishte Province. It passes north of the village of Mirovets and south of Presyak and 2.1 km northeast of the latter reaches its terminus at Km 95.5 of the first class I-2 road.
