= II-74 road (Bulgaria) =

Road in Bulgaria

Republic Road I-74
- Републикански път I-74

Route information
- Length: 38 km (24 mi)

Major junctions
- From: Km 138.5 of I-7
- To: Km 70.8 of II-51

Location
- Country: Bulgaria
- Towns: Veliki Preslav, Targovishte

Highway system
- Highways in Bulgaria

Republican Road II-74 (Bulgarian: Републикански път II-74) is a second-class road in northeastern Bulgaria, running through Shumen and Targovishte Provinces. Its length is 38 km.

== Route description ==
The road begins at Km 138.5 of the first class I-7 road southeast of the town of Veliki Preslav and heads in direction west–northwest. It runs through the town center and the villages of Mostich and Imrenchevo, and enters Targovishte Province. There, it passes through the villages of Kralevo, Pevets and Ruets and reaches the town of Targovishte. In the town's western outskirts there is an intersection with the first class I-4 road at the latter's Km 231.2. The road then turns northwest, passing through the village of Zdravets and reaching its terminus southeast of the village of Dralfa at Km 70.8 of the second class II-51 road.
