= Targovishte Airport =

Targovishte Airport Летище Търговище
- IATA: TGV; ICAO: LBTG

Summary
- Airport type: Public
- Owner: State ownership
- Serves: Buhovtsi, Bulgaria
- Location: Buhovtsi, Bulgaria
- Opened: 1969
- Closed: 10 November 1999
- Elevation AMSL: 203 m (666 ft)
- Coordinates: 43°18′24.4″N 26°42′0.4″E

Map
- Location within Bulgaria

Runways
Direction	Length		Surface
Direction	m	ft	Surface
11/29	2,149	7,050	Asphalt
- Source: Landings.com

Targovishte Airport (IATA: TGV, ICAO: LBTG), also known Buhovtsi Airfield, is located near the village of Buhovtsi, 13 km from the city of Targovishte. Its unique location gives a chance for service of an area covering three regions including Targovishte, Shumen and Razgrad Provinces. It is currently inoperational because of the lack of financial resources.

== See also ==
- Targovishte Province at Wikipedia
- List of airports in Bulgaria
