= Bozhurka =

- Village
- Bozhurka
- Location within Bulgaria
- Coordinates: 43.183197°N 26.447364°E
- Country: Bulgaria
- Province: Targovishte
- Municipality: Targovishte Municipality

Area
  - Total: 8.346 km^{2} (3.222 sq mi)
- Elevation: 498 m (1,634 ft)

Population
  - Total: 288
- Postal code: 7765
- Area code: 06068

Bozhurka is a village in Northern Bulgaria. The village is in Targovishte Municipality, Targovishte Province. Аccording to the numbers provided by the 2020 Bulgarian census, Bozhurka currently has a population of 288 people with a permanent address registered in the settlement.

== Geography ==
Bozhurka village is in Municipality Targovishte, 25 kilometers southeast away from Targovishte.

The elevation of the village ranges between 500 and 699 meters with an average elevation of 498m above sea level.

The village's climate is continental and has a great environment for tobacco production and sheep breeding, animal husbandry in general. Despite that, there are many abandoned agricultural facilities in the village.

== Buildings and infrastructure ==
- The local community hall and library "Probuda" was built in 1936 and is still active.
- There is a kindergarten in the village.

Some of the children from the village study in Targovishte's IV Elementary school "Ivan Vazov"

== Ethnicity ==
According to the Bulgarian population census in 2011.

	Number	%
Total	289	100.00
Bulgarians	0	0
Turks	274	94.80
Romani	13	4.49
Others	0	0
Do not define themselves	0	0
Unanswered	0	0
