= Bratovo =

Bratovo may refer to:

- In Bulgaria (written in Cyrillic as Братово):
  - Bratovo, Burgas Province - a town in Burgas municipality, Burgas Province
  - Bratovo, Targovishte Province - a village in Targovishte municipality, Targovishte Province
