= Buynovo, Targovishte Province =

Buynovo
- Village
- Buynovo
- Location within Bulgaria
- Coordinates: 43.376846°N 26.756399°E
- Country: Bulgaria
- Province: Targovishte
- Municipality: Targovishte

Area
  - Total: 20.004 km^{2} (7.724 sq mi)
- Elevation: 353 m (1,158 ft)

Population
  - Total: 644
- Postal code: 7753
- Area code: 06066

Buynovo is a village in Northern Bulgaria. The village is in Targovishte Municipality, Targovishte Province. Аccording to the numbers provided by the 2020 Bulgarian census, Buynovo currently has a population of 644 people with a permanent address registered in the settlement.

== Geography ==
Buynovo village is in Municipality Targovishte. There is a water dam with the same name "Yazovir Buynovo" located in the same municipality. It stems from the river banks of the Beli Lom and Rusenski Lom rivers.

The elevation of the village ranges between 300 and 499 meters with an average elevation of 353 meters above sea level. The village's climate is continental.

== Buildings and infrastructure ==
- The local community hall and library "Razvitie" is still acting.
- There is a ritual hall in the village.

== Ethnicity ==
According to the Bulgarian population census in 2011.

| | Number | Percentage(in %) |
| Total | 465 | 100.00 |
| Bulgarians | 15 | 3.22 |
| Turks | 121 | 26.02 |
| Romani | 284 | 61.07 |
| Others | 0 | 0 |
| Do not define themselves | 17 | 3.65 |
| Unanswered | 28 | 6.02 |
