= Golyamo Novo =

- Village
- Golyamo Novo
- Location within Bulgaria
- Coordinates: 43.335552°N 26.371302°E
- Country: Bulgaria
- Province: Targovishte
- Municipality: Targovishte Municipality

Area
  - Total: 20.956 km^{2} (8.091 sq mi)
- Elevation: 262 m (860 ft)

Population
  - Total: 1,239
- Postal code: 7789
- Area code: 060642

Golyamo Novo is a village in Northern Bulgaria. The village is in Targovishte Municipality, Targovishte Province. Аccording to the numbers provided by the 2020 Bulgarian census, Golyamo Novo currently has a population of 1239 people with a permanent address registered in the settlement.

== Geography ==
Golyamo Novo village is in Municipality Targovishte. The elevation of the village ranges between 200 and 499 meters with an average elevation of 262 meters above sea level. The village's climate is continental.

== Buildings and infrastructure ==
The roads in the village are in good condition. There is an elementary school, a grocery store, and a pharmacy.

Other active buildings in the village are.

- Elementary school "G. S. Rakovski"
- The local community hall and library "Probuda" is still acting
- Kindergarten "Shtastlivo Detstvo”

== Ethnicity ==
According to the Bulgarian population census in 2011.

	Number	Percentage(in %)
Total	919	100.00
Bulgarians	193	21.00
Turks	254	27.63
Romani	415	45.15
Others	0	0
Do not define themselves	0	0
Unanswered	41	4.46
