= Dormition of the Theotokos Church, Targovishte =

Church building in Targoviste, Bulgaria

Dormition of the Theotokos Church Църква Св. Успение Богородично (in Bulgarian)
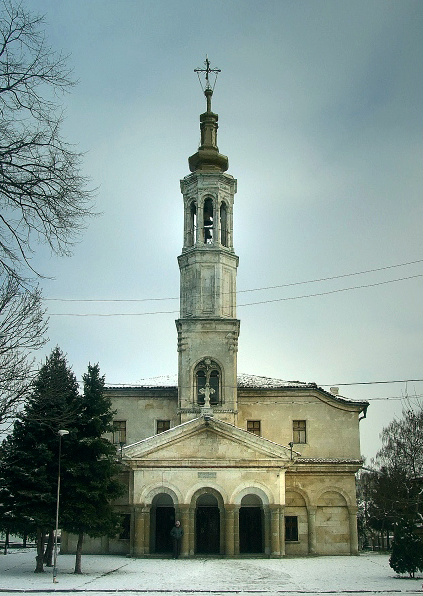

Religion
- Affiliation: Eastern Orthodox
- Province: Targovishte Province
- Ecclesiastical or organisational status: Church

Location
- Location: Targovishte, Bulgaria
- Interactive map of Dormition of the Theotokos Church; Църква Св. Успение Богородично (in Bulgarian)
- Coordinates: 43°14′34″N 26°34′8″E

Architecture
- Architects: Usta Dimitar, Paul Forlani
- Style: Bulgarian National Revival
- Completed: 1851
- Height (max): 30 m

Dormition of the Theotokos Church (Bulgarian: Църква Св. Успение Богородично / Tsŭrkva Sv. Uspenie Bogorodichno) is an Eastern Orthodox church building in Targovishte. It is one of the finest examples of the middle and late Bulgarian National Revival church architecture.

The building is situated in the Varosha Quarter - the old town in Targovishte. The church was built in the period 1847–1851 by Usta Dimitar from the Tryavna School. Initially the bell tower was a wooden structure next to the building. The three-naved church is built from stone on 510 sq.m. In 1860, the interior decoration, including the chancel-screen, was made, again by artists from the Tryavna School. In the very beginning of the 20th century the present elegant bell tower was added by Gencho Novakov, on a design by the Italian Paul Forlani.

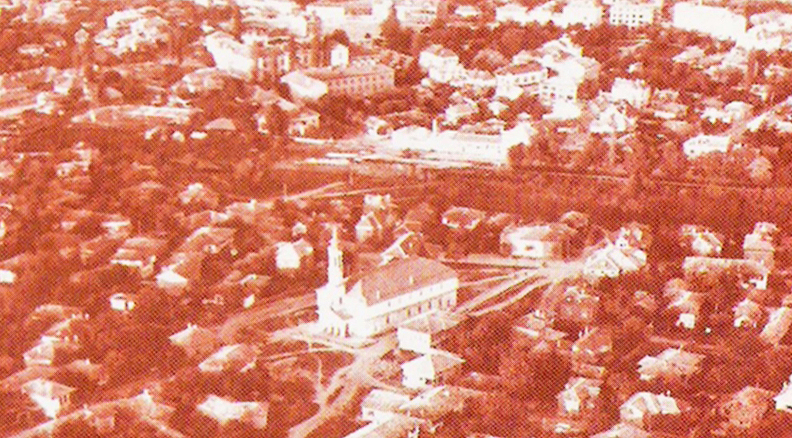
Areal view of Targovishte from the middle of 20th century with the church at the center

== Gallery ==
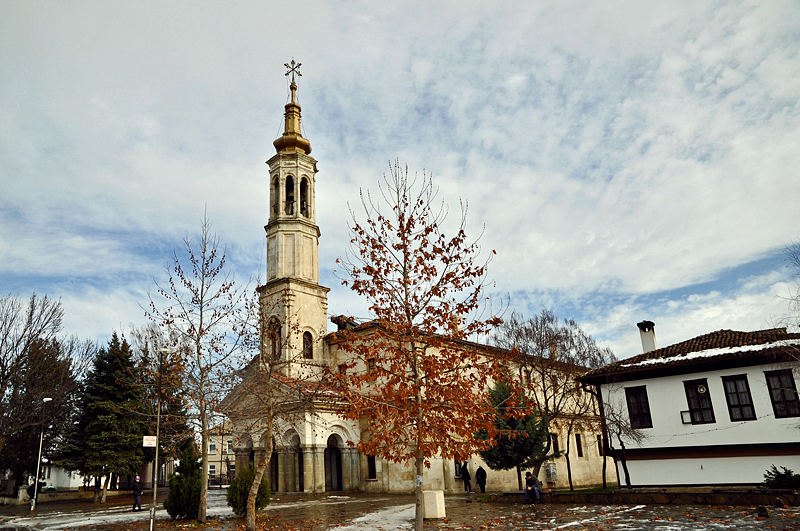

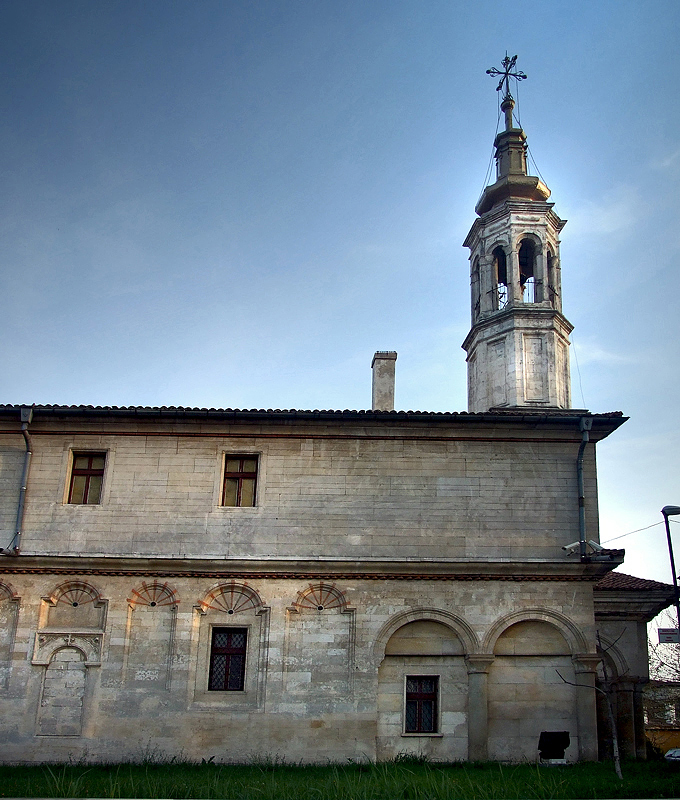

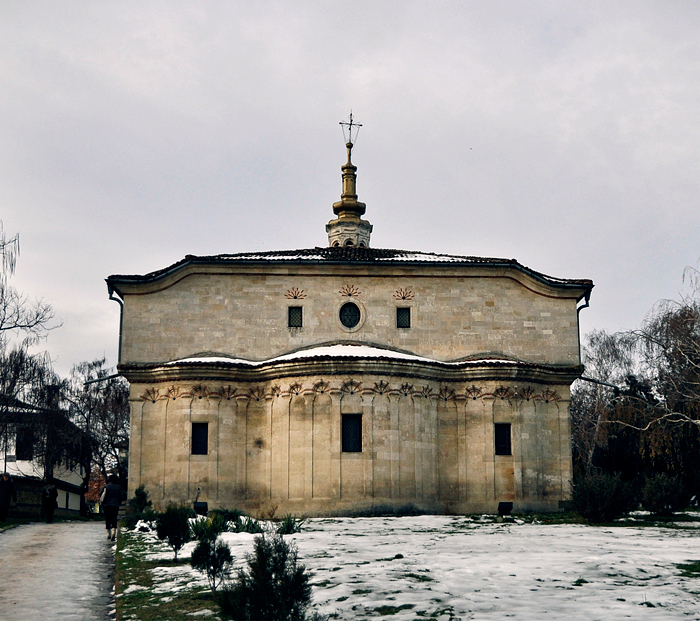

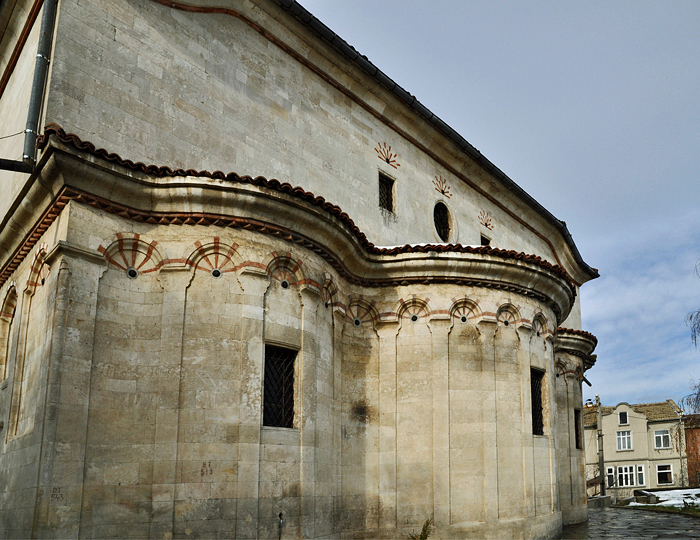

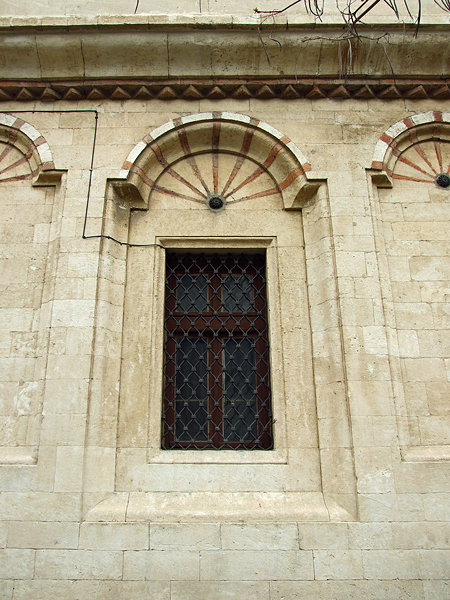

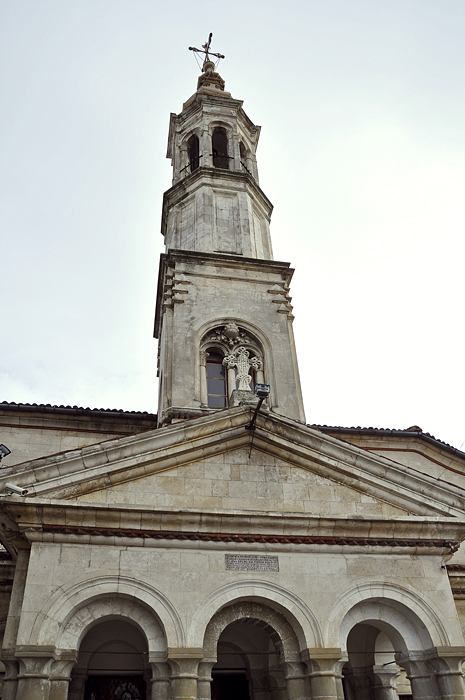

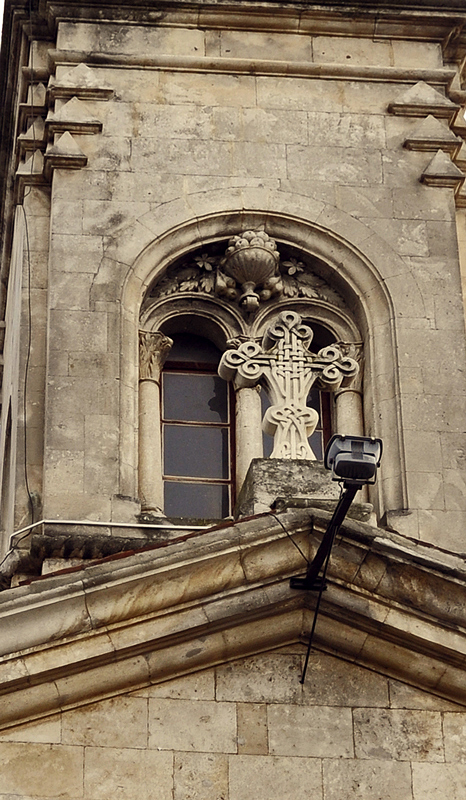

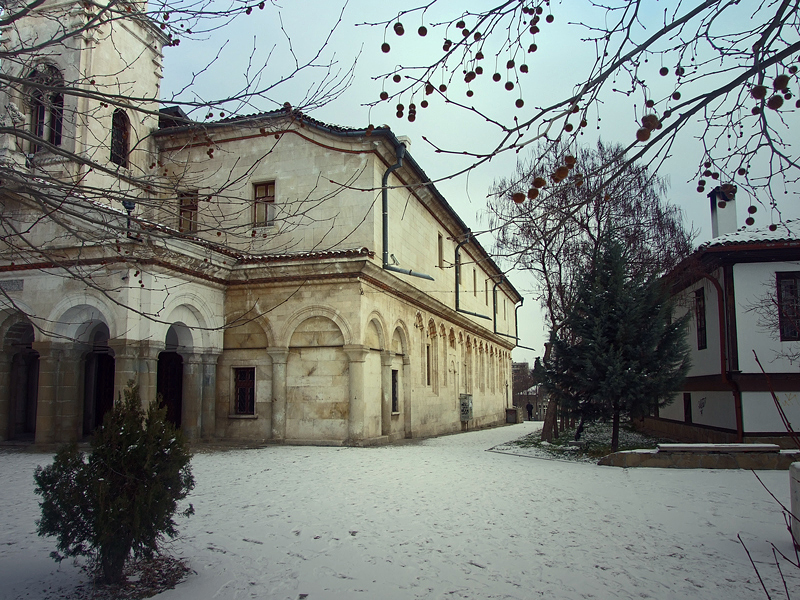
