= Tumbalovo =

Tumbalovo Тумбалово
- Village
- Interactive map of Tumbalovo
- Coordinates: 42°52′N 25°06′E
- Country: Bulgaria
- Province: Gabrovo Province
- Municipality: Sevlievo
- Time zone: UTC+2 (EET)
  - Summer (DST): UTC+3 (EEST)

Tumbalovo is a village in Northern Bulgaria. It is located in the municipality of Sevlievo, Gabrovo region.

== Geography ==
Village Tumbalovo village is located in a mountainous area with extensive views. Located 26 km. from Sevlievo. The village is in poor condition. There are warped trees and fallen noise along the way. Winter temperatures are low and the summer is very hot (sometimes). It passes through the village Rositsa River. In this village attend summer many Bulgarians to stretch tents or simply to bathe in the depths of the river or both. The village offers a mowed field for tents fee. Although the plight of the village people go to enjoy the fresh air, fresh water and most - no peace among mountain.
