= Targovishte =

Targovishte Търговище
- City
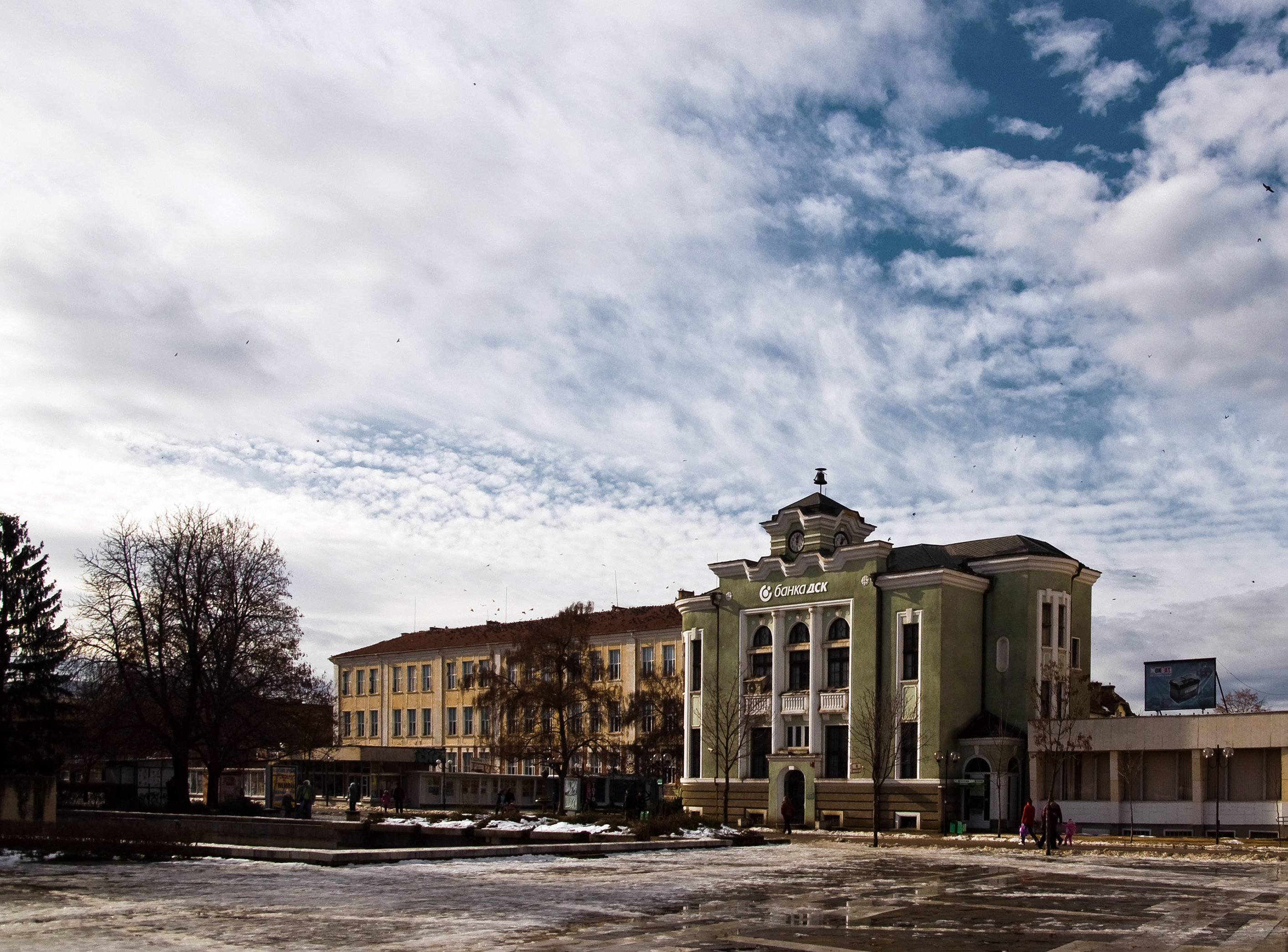

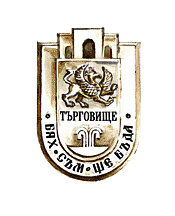
- Coat of arms

- Location of Targovishte
- Coordinates: 43°15′N 26°35′E
- Country: Bulgaria
- Province (Oblast): Targovishte
- Municipality: Targovishte

Government
  - Mayor: Darin Dimitrov (GERB)

Area
  - City: 87.427 km^{2} (33.756 sq mi)
- Elevation: 170 m (560 ft)

Population (2021)
  - City: 34,793
  - Density: 397.97/km^{2} (1,030.7/sq mi)
  - Urban: 53,041
- Time zone: UTC+2 (EET)
  - Summer (DST): UTC+3 (EEST)
- Postal Code: 7700
- Area code: 0601
- License Plate: T
- Website: Official website

Targovishte (Bulgarian: Търговище, also transliterated Tǎrgovište, pronounced [tɐrˈɡɔviʃtɛ], Turkish: Eski Cuma) is a city in Bulgaria, the administrative and economic capital of Targovishte Province.

It is situated at the northern foot of the low mountain of Preslav on both banks of the Vrana River. The town is 335 kilometres (208 miles) north-east of the capital Sofia and about 125 km (78 mi) west of the city of Varna and the Bulgarian Black Sea Coast. Targovishte is known as an old market settlement.

== Name ==
The name comes from the Slavic root targ ("trade") + the Slavic placename suffix -ishte, "market town" (a calque of the Ottoman Turkish Eski Cuma, "old Friday", though the Turkish name may be derived from the earlier Bulgarian Sborishte "gathering place"). The name is etymologically and semantically the same as that of the city Târgoviște in Romania, the town of Trgovište in Serbia, and the village of Trhovište in Slovakia.

== City ==
Archaeological studies prove that in these places there were people in the Copper-Stone Age (Chalcolithic) – between the 5th and the 4th millennium BC. In the city's vicinity are the remains of Thracian settlements (5th–3rd century BC), a Roman settlement (2nd–4th century AD), and a fortress from the early Byzantine period (5th–6th century). A Bulgarian settlement was founded in the 10th century during the First Bulgarian Empire, however due to its proximity to the capital Preslav, it did not develop until the 12th century. In the 12th century, due to its location on a main road from the new capital Veliko Turnovo, a fortress by the name "Сборище" (Sborishte) was built.

In the 18th and 19th centuries it became a famous market for animals and craft products called Eski Cuma ("old bazaar" in Turkish). A monastical school was opened in the 18th century and a secular one, called the Slaveykov School and situated in the old Varosha Quarter was established in 1846, with Petko Slaveykov being a teacher there; a chitalishte was also built. Industrial development began after the Second World War. Factories producing car batteries and machines for the food industry were opened; later, furniture and textile industries developed. One of Bulgaria's largest wine production factories is located there. Targovishte is home to one of the largest glass factories in Europe. The investment in the factory was $380,000,000 and employs 1,500 people.

The town is a cultural centre. In 2000, ruins of an Ancient Roman town called Missionis (Мисионис) were unearthed near Targovishte. The town art gallery named after the eminent Bulgarian artist Nikola Marinov, who was born here, has a considerable collection of his works.

The local football team is called PFC Svetkavitsa ("lightning") and plays in the B PFG. The city is also noted for its shooting sports traditions. There is also a drama theatre and a puppet theatre.

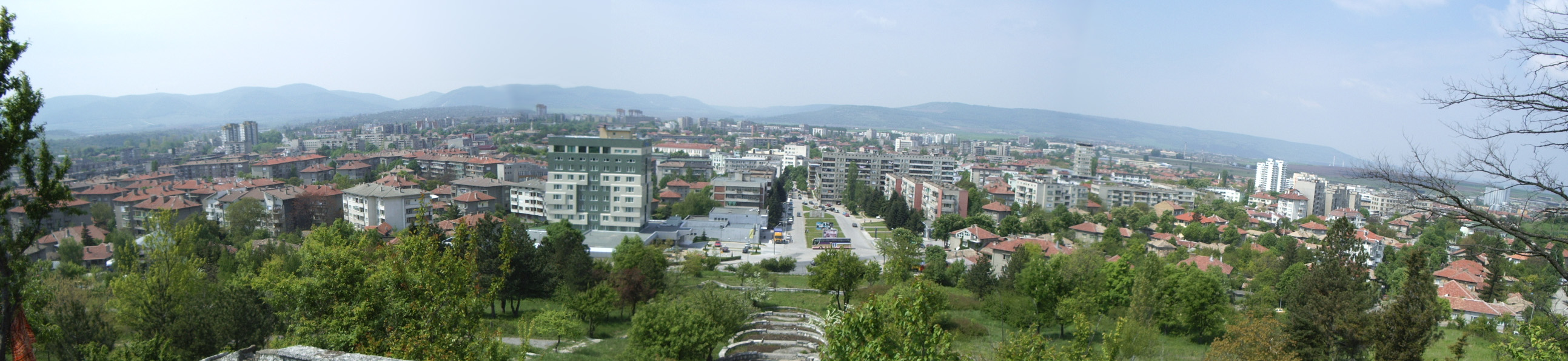
A panoramic view of the city

== Population ==
In January 2012, Targovishte was inhabited by 37,341 people within the city limits, while the Targovishte Municipality with the legally affiliated adjacent villages had 56,868 inhabitants. The number of the residents of the city (not the municipality) reached its peak in the period 1980-1990 when exceeded 45,000 with a highest rate in 1989 numbering 47,798. The following table presents the change of the population after 1887.

Targovishte
| Year | 1887 | 1910 | 1934 | 1946 | 1956 | 1965 | 1975 | 1985 | 1992 | 2001 | 2005 | 2009 | 2011 | 2021 |
| Population | 8,519 | 9,388 | 10,343 | 10,561 | 14,193 | 25,588 | 38,875 | 46,043 | 42,988 | 40,659 | 38,390 | 37,375 | 37,611 | 34,793 |
| | Highest number 47,798 in 1989 | | | | | | | | | | | | | |
Sources: National Statistical Institute, citypopulation.de, pop-stat.mashke.org, Bulgarian Academy of Sciences

=== Ethnic, linguistic and religious composition ===
According to the latest 2011 census data, the individuals declared their ethnic identity were distributed as follows:

- Bulgarians: 27,825 (79.4%)
- Turks: 6,222 (17.8%)
- Roma: 633 (1.8%)
- Others: 138 (0.4%)
- Indefinable: 235 (0.7%)
  - Undeclared: 2,558 (4.2%)

Total: 37,611

The ethnic composition of Targovishte Municipality is 33,229 Bulgarians, 14,883 Turks and 3,902 Roma among others.

== Municipality ==
Targovishte is the administrative centre for the Targovishte Municipality, one of five municipalities of the Targovishte Province. In addition to Targovishte, which has the status of town (in Bulgarian: град, transliterated as grad), the municipality contains 51 other localities with the status of village (in Bulgarian: село, transliterated as selo).

The following list shows the names of localities transliterated in Latin alphabet, followed in parentheses by the name in the Bulgarian Cyrillic alphabet (which links to the corresponding Bulgarian Wikipedia article).

- Aleksandrovo (Александрово)
- Alvanovo (Алваново)
- Bayachevo (Баячево)
- Bistra (Бистра)
- Bojurka (Божурка)
- Bratovo (Братово)
- Buhovtsi (Буховци)
- Buynovo (Буйново)
- Cherkovna (Черковна)
- Dalgach (Дългач)
- Davidovo (Давидово)
- Draganovets (Драгановец)
- Dralfa (Дралфа)
- Golyamo Sokolovo (Голямо Соколово)
- Golyamo novo (Голямо Ново)
- Gorna Kabda (Горна Кабда)
- Koprets (Копрец)

- Koshnichari (Кошничари)
- Kralevo (Кралево)
- Krashno (Кръшно)
- Lilyak (Лиляк)
- Lovets (Ловец)
- Makariopolsko (Макариополско)
- Makovo (Маково)
- Miladinovtsi (Миладиновци)
- Mirovets (Мировец)
- Momino (Момино)
- Nadarevo (Надарево)
- Osen (Осен)
- Ostrets (Острец)
- Ovcharovo (Овчарово)
- Paydushko (Пайдушко)
- Pevets (Певец)
- Podgoritsa (Подгорица)

- Preselets (Преселец)
- Presian (Пресиян)
- Presyak (Пресяк)
- Probuda (Пробуда)
- Prolaz (Пролаз)
- Ralitsa (Ралица)
- Razboyna (Разбойна)
- Rosina (Росина)
- Ruets (Руец)
- Saedinenie (Съединение)
- Strazha (Стража)
- Tarnovtsa (Търновца)
- Tsvetnitsa (Цветница)
- Tvardintsi (Твърдинци)
- Vardun (Вардун)
- Vasil Levski (Васил Левски)
- Zdravets (Здравец)

== Honour ==
Targovishte Glacier on Greenwich Island in the South Shetland Islands, Antarctica is named after Targovishte.

== Religion ==
=== Churches ===
- Sv. Uspenie Bogorodichno Church (Dormition of the Theotokos Church)
- St. John of Rila Church

== Schools ==
- Sveti Sedmochislenitsi High School
- Profesor Nikola Marinov High School
- Mitropolit Andrey High School
- Hristo Botev Comprehensive School
- P.R.Slaveykov Comprehensive School
- John Atanasov Vocational School
- Nikola Simov Vocational(Sport) School
- St. John of Rila School for children with hearing problems

== Sport ==
- The Stadion Dimitar Burkov is the home ground of the football team PFK Svetkavitsa 1922.
- The Targovishte Speedway Stadium hosted important motorcycle speedway events, including qualifying rounds of the Speedway World Championship in 1980, 1982, 1985, 1986 and 1987 and a qualifying round of the 1979 Speedway World Pairs Championship. As of 2024, the stadium is not used and is in a state of disrepair but is still situated off ul. "Stefan Karadzha", adjacent to the Central Targovishte Cemetery (on the south side).

== Notable people ==
- Andrey, Metropolitan of New York
- Nikola Marinov (artist)
- Nikola Simov (revolutionary)
- 100 Kila (musician)
- Yordan Kamdzhalov (conductor)
- Dr.Hristo Hristov (financist)
- Rosen Vladimirov, former National Assemblyman for Targovishte
- Tunalı Hilmi, Turkish politician

== International relations ==
=== Twin towns – sister cities ===
Targovishte is twinned with:

- Bolhrad, Ukraine
- Cottbus, Germany
- Kozani, Greece
- Santa Maria da Feira, Portugal
- Smolensk, Russia
- Suresnes, France
- Târgovişte, Romania
- Waterloo, United States
- Utrecht, The Netherlands

== Gallery ==
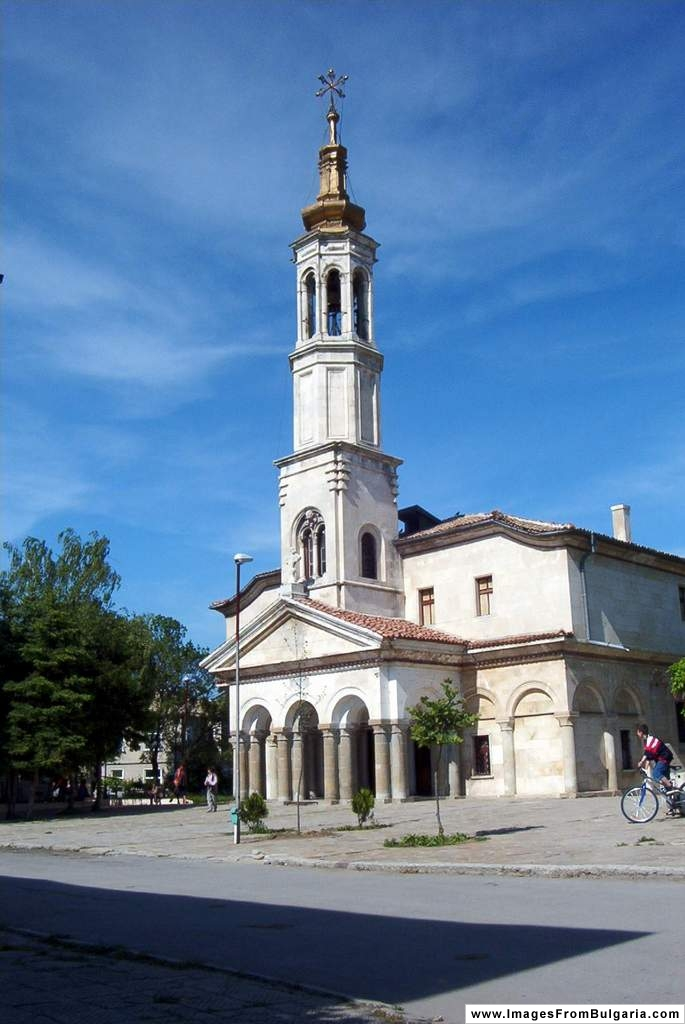
Church of the Dormition of the Holy Mother (1851)

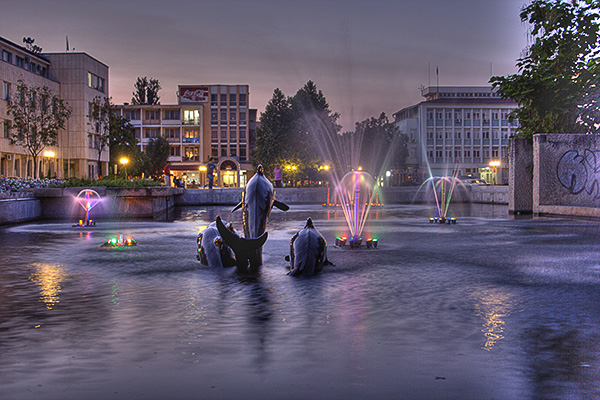
Targovishte centre

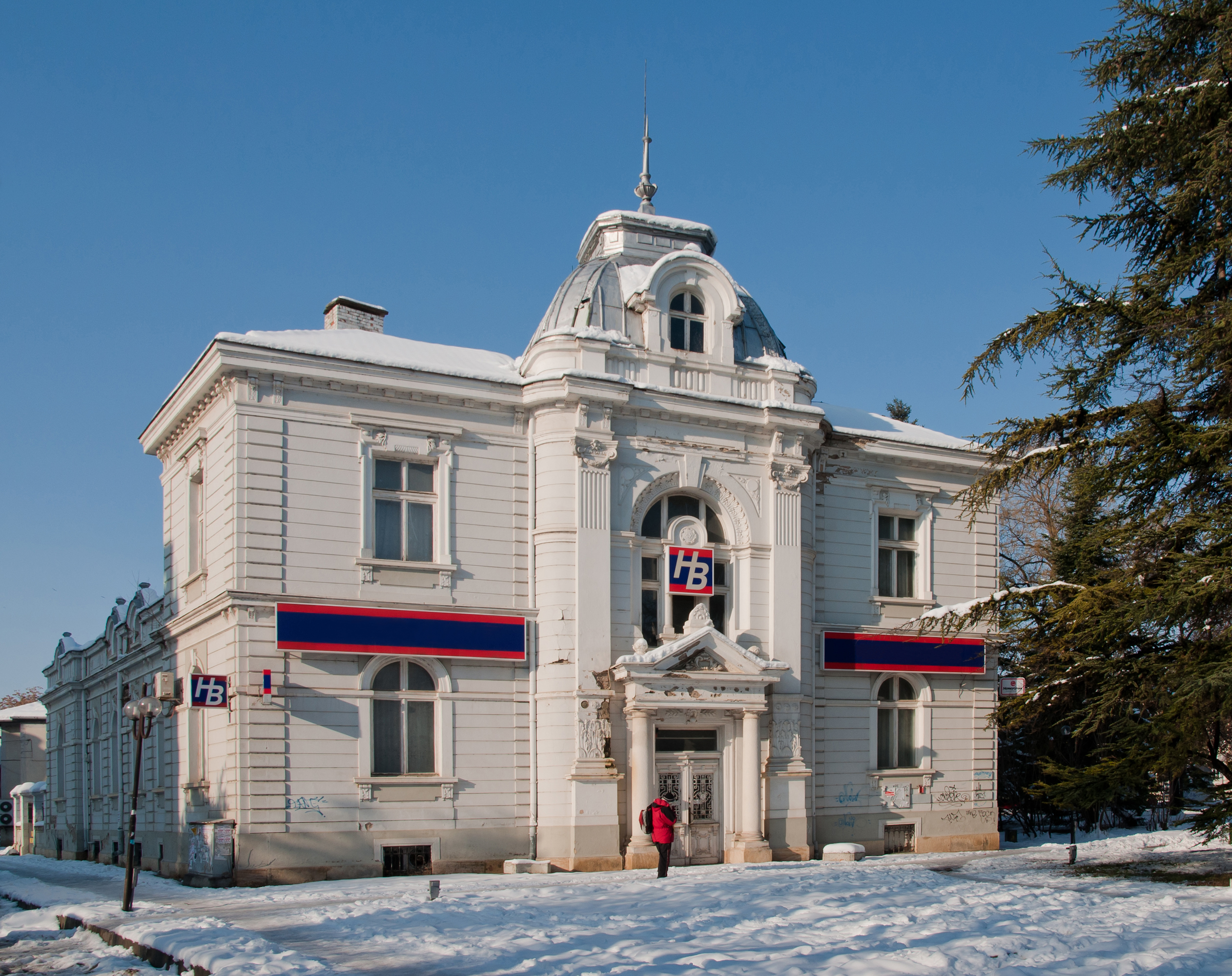
Street scene

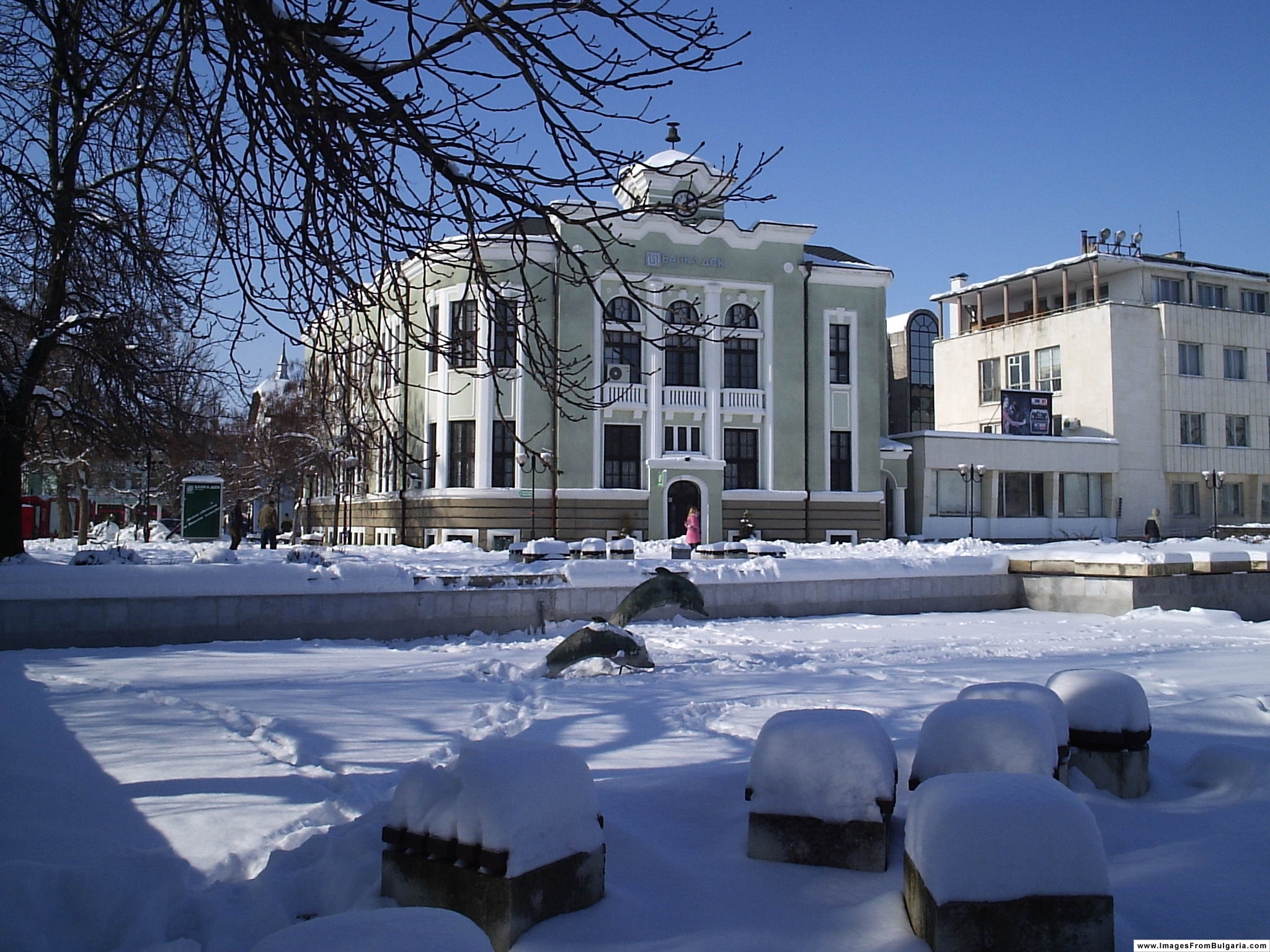
Street scene

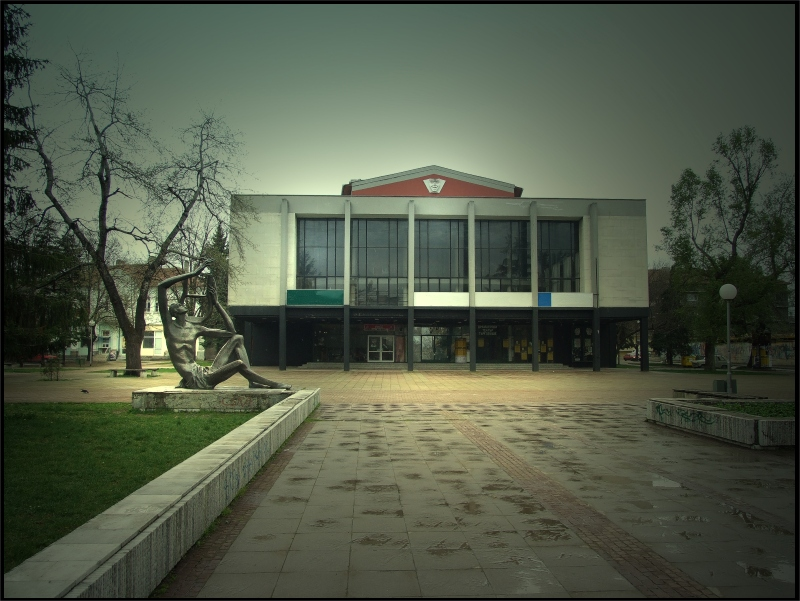
Targovishte Theatre with the Statue of Orpheus

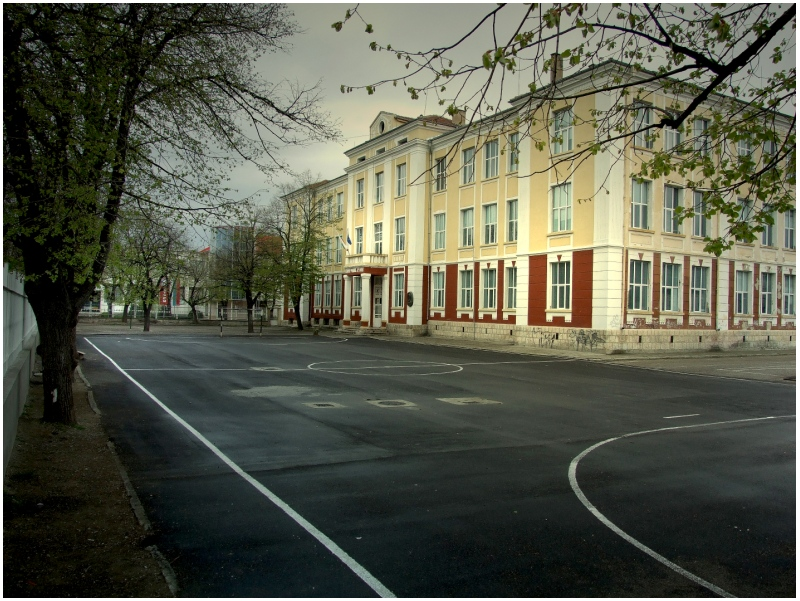
Comprehensive School Hristo Botev

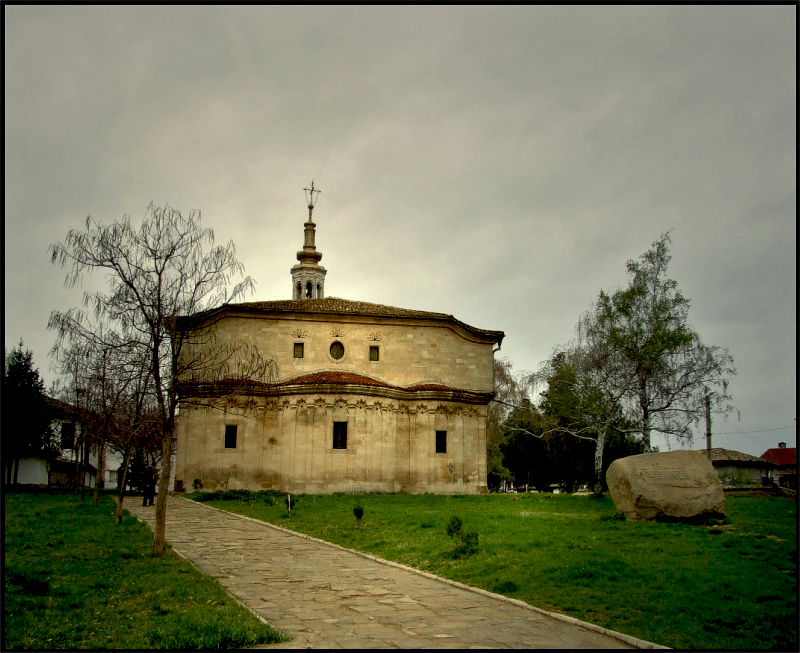
The Old Church

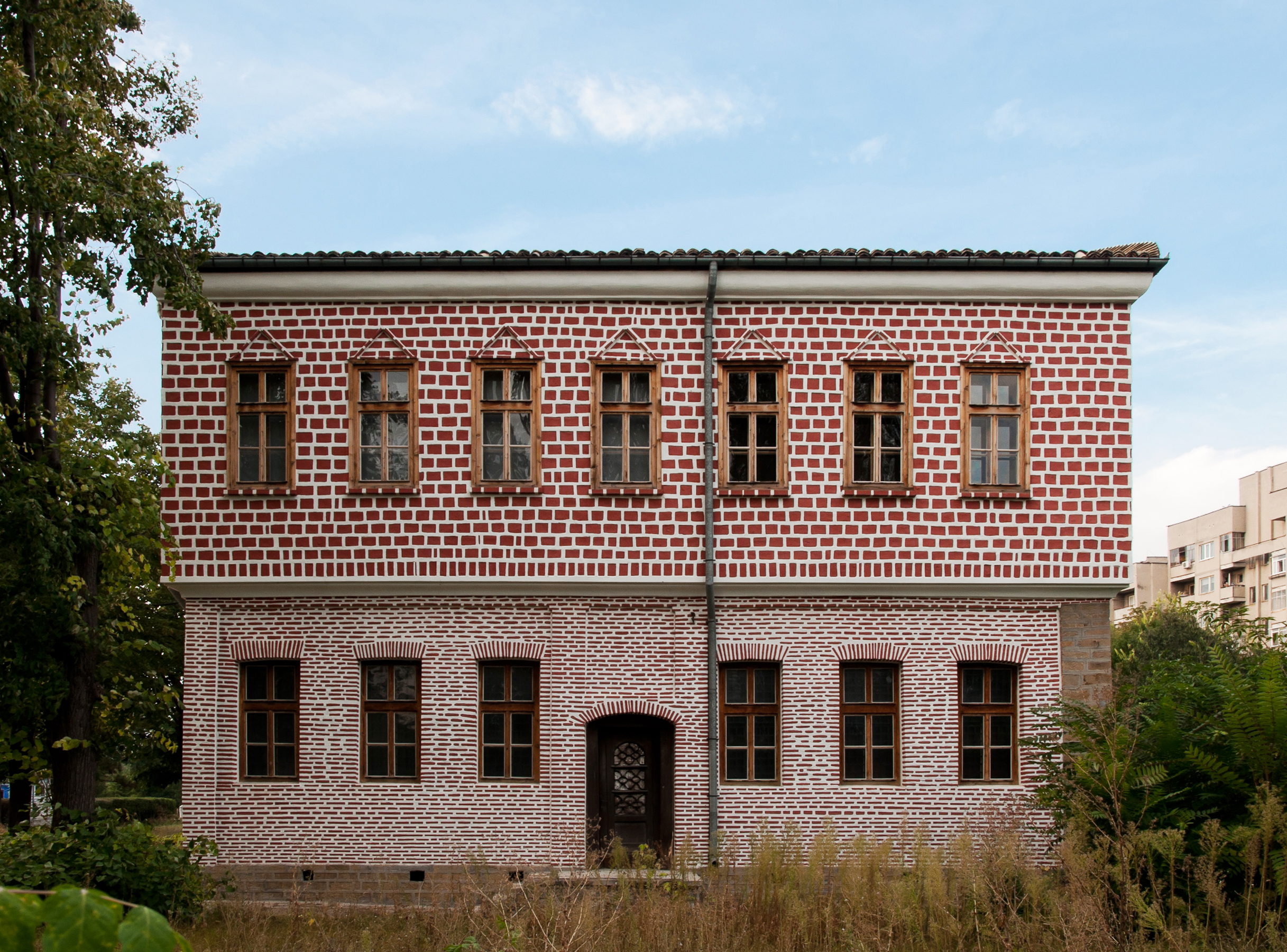
The Old Slaveykov School (Now Museum)

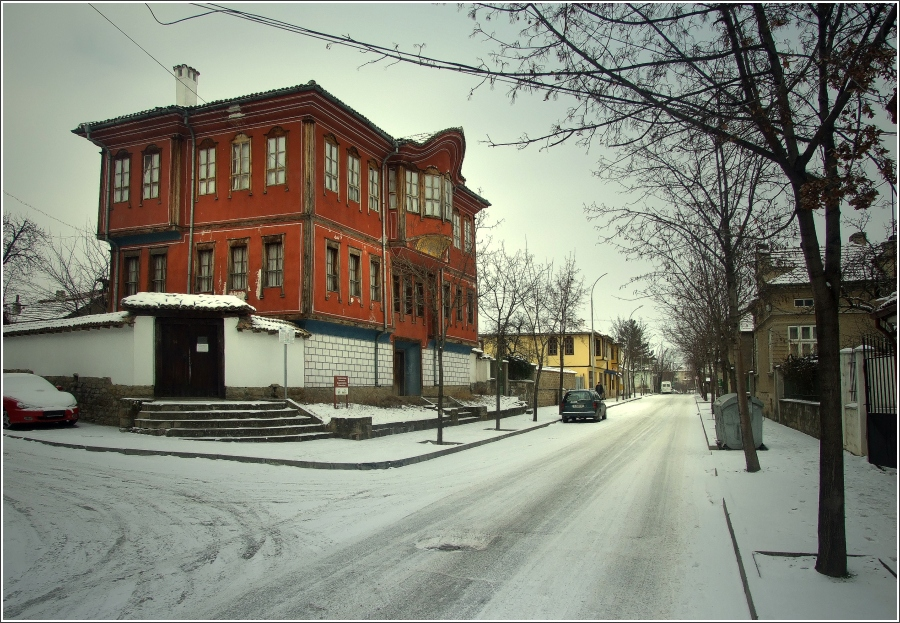
The Old Quarter Varosha

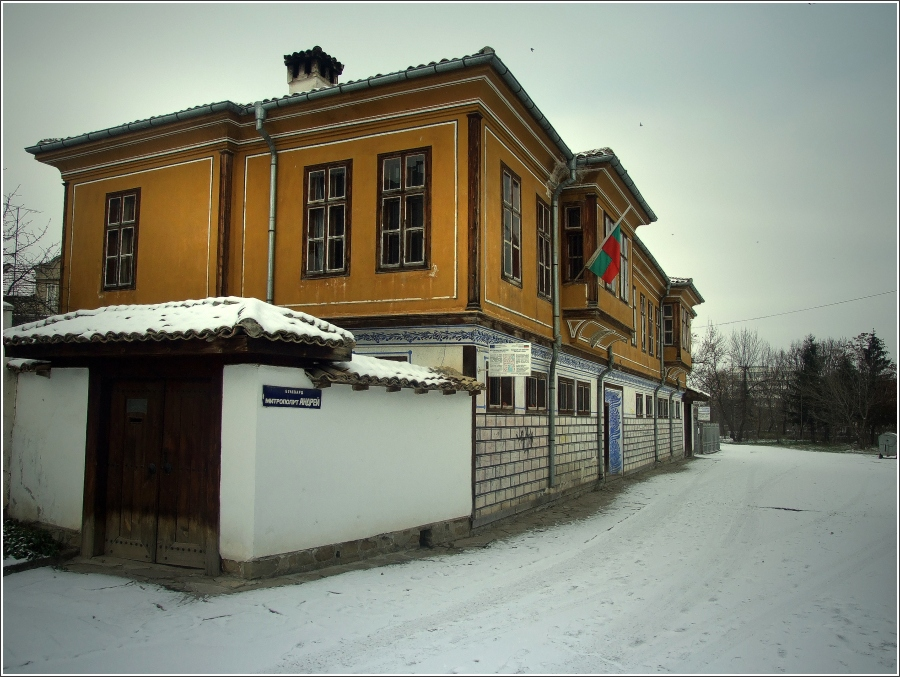
The Old Quarter Varosha

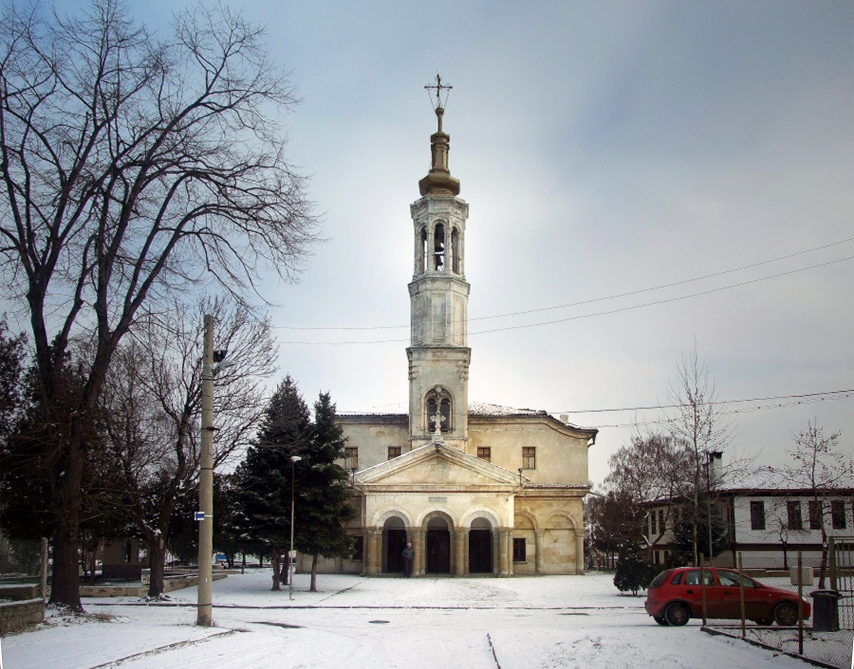
The Old Church

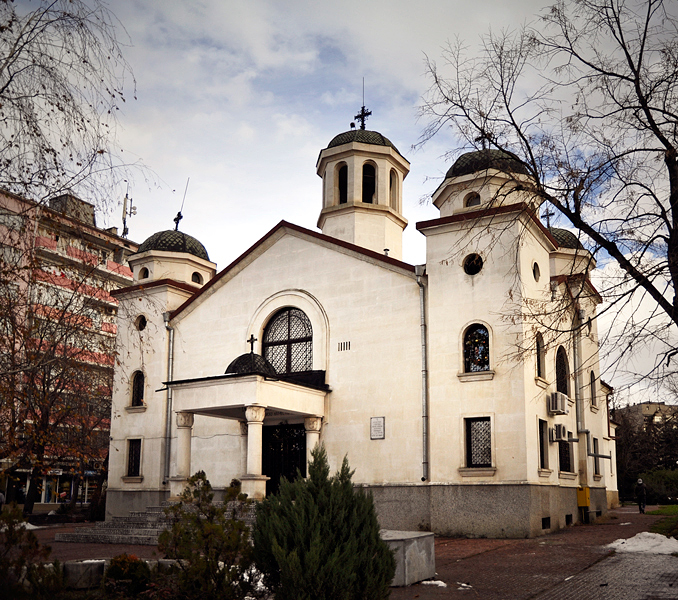
St. John of Rila church
