= Hristo Botev Comprehensive School, Targovishte =

Hristo Botev School
- I ОУ „Христо Ботев“
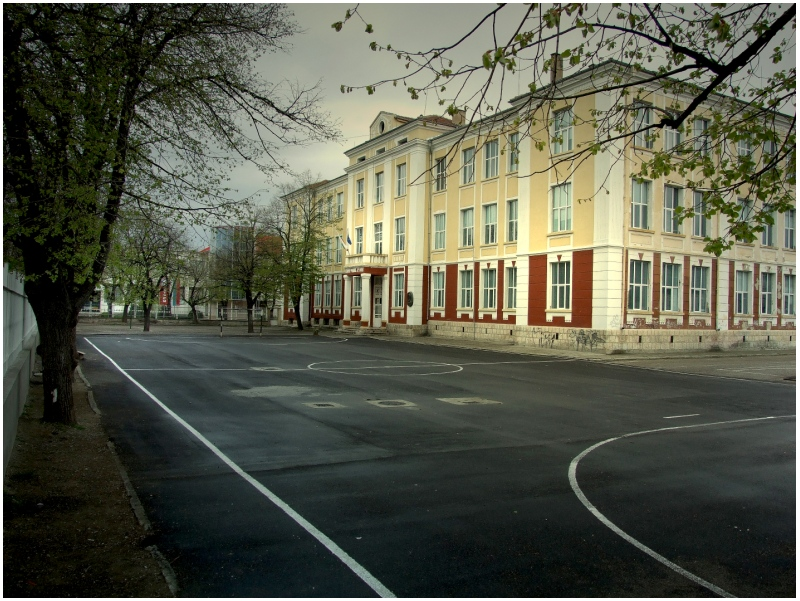
- The school in 2005

Location
- Ivan Vazov Str. 2 (Town Center); Targovishte; Bulgaria
- Coordinates: 43°14′45″N 26°34′18″E

Information
- School type: Comprehensive
- Age: 7 to 14
- Classes offered: 1-8

Hristo Botev School (Bulgarian: Училище Христо Ботев) is a comprehensive school in the town of Targovishte in the Targovishte Province, Bulgaria.

Named after the Bulgarian poet and revolutionary Hristo Botev, the school is among the oldest ones in the town and province. It has 8 grades, separated in two educational levels. The first 3 grades are in the Primary level for children 7/8/9 years old. The next 5 grades are in the Secondary level for children aged 10–14. After graduating the school, pupils may continue their education at some High school or Vocational school.

== History ==
=== The Origin ===
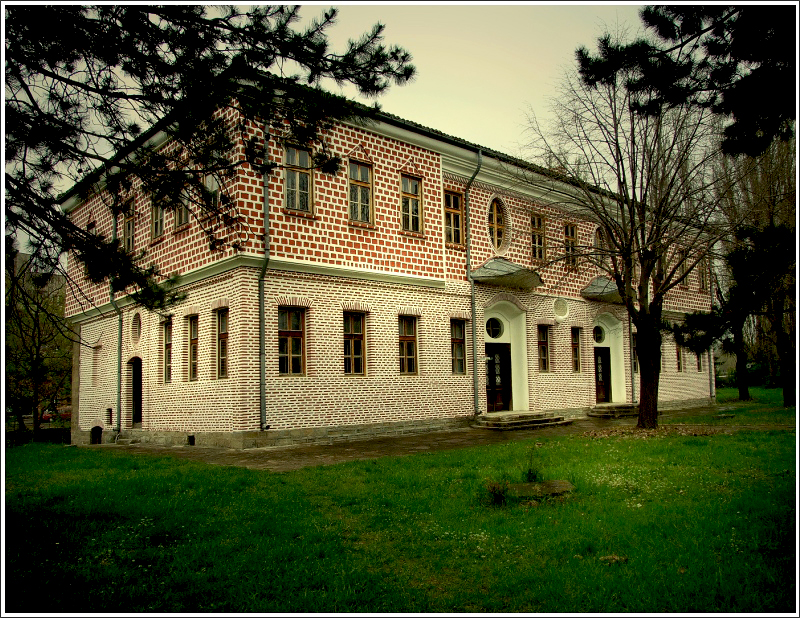
The initial building from 1863 (Slaveykov school) - nowadays museum

The school is considered as one of the two successors of the old class school founded in 1846 and named St. Sedmochislenitsi. Since 1863 the school has been housed in the newly constructed building. The eminent Bulgarian enlightener Petko Slaveykov was involved as a head teacher who openly expressed his admiration for the edifice. That's why the school is also known today as a Slaveykov school. The building is well preserved till nowadays and houses a museum exposition.

" A house for the school has been built in the name of the St. Sedmochislenitsi, an edifice like which a second one can't be seen throughout the whole of Bulgaria till now."

— Petko R. Slaveykov, Gaida newspaper, 1863, on the new school building.

Until 1882 the school was only for boys. Since the next year it was transformed in a co-educational school. In 1905, because of the economic progress from the end of the 19th century, it was decided by the municipal authorities a high-school class to be established.

=== Self-Dependence ===
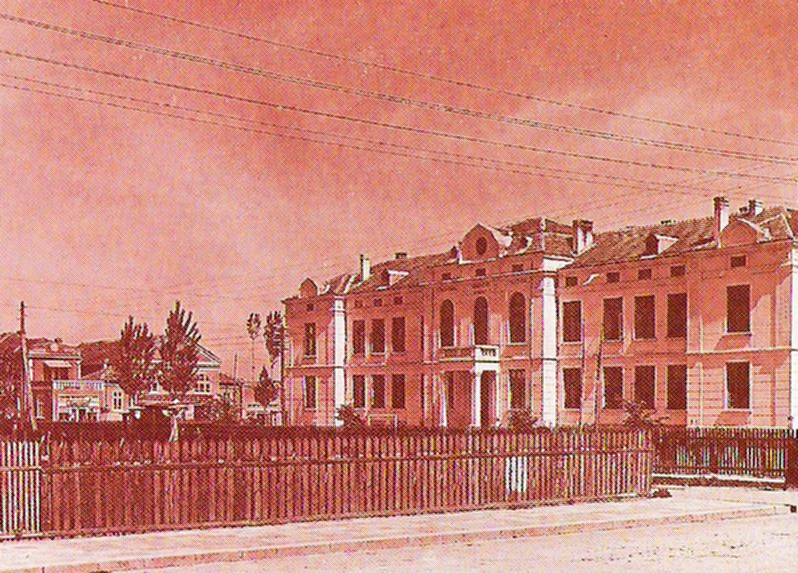
The building from 1931

In 1924, the primary and secondary levels of education were organized as a separate institution from the existing school. Ivan Haladzhov was appointed a headmaster. The construction of a new building was started. It was completed in 1931 and the newly founded school began its self-dependent existence. About three decades later an additional storey was raised. Since 1962 the school was named after the Bulgarian poet and revolutionary Hristo Botev.

== Site ==
The school building is situated at the center of the town near the Central Town Garden. It has a large open-area school yard featuring two playgrounds with asphalt covering and a smaller one with some sand areas. There are also two indoor sports halls as one of them is two level high.

A town puppet theater hall is attached to the west wing of the building.
