= Targovishte Municipality =

Targovishte Municipality Община Търговище
- Municipality
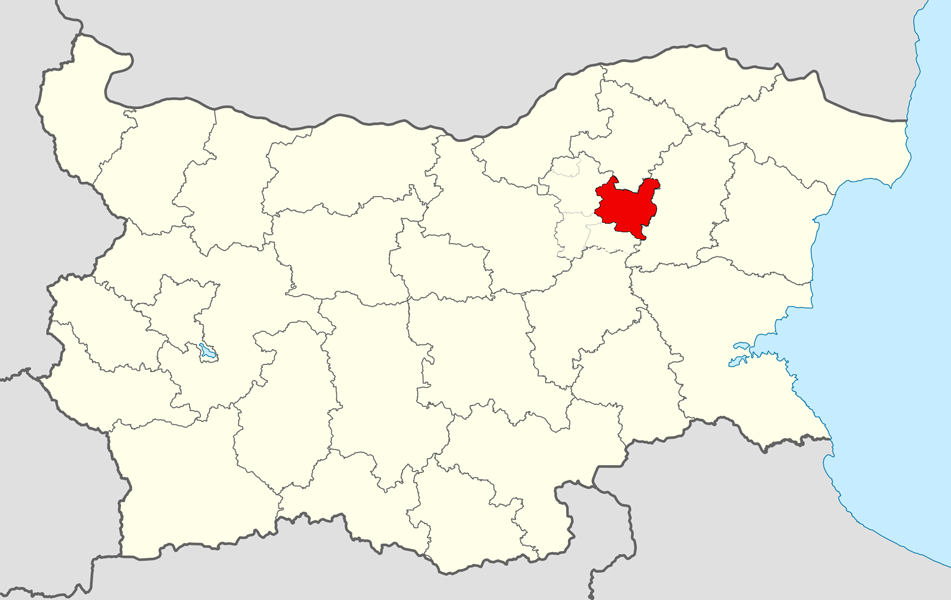
- Targovishte Municipality within Bulgaria and Targovishte Province.
- Coordinates: 43°14′N 26°33′E
- Country: Bulgaria
- Province (Oblast): Targovishte
- Admin. centre (Obshtinski tsentar): Targovishte

Area
  - Total: 872 km^{2} (337 sq mi)

Population (December 2009)
  - Total: 60,497
  - Density: 69.4/km^{2} (180/sq mi)
- Time zone: UTC+2 (EET)
  - Summer (DST): UTC+3 (EEST)

Targovishte Municipality (Bulgarian: Община Търговище) is a municipality (obshtina) in Targovishte Province, Northeastern Bulgaria, located in the transition between the Danubian Plain and the area of the so-called Fore-Balkan. It is named after its administrative centre - the city of Targovishte which is also the capital of the province.

The municipality embraces a territory of 872 km^{2} (337 sq mi) with a population of 60,497 inhabitants, as of December 2009. The Hemus motorway is planned to cross the area north of the main city.

== Settlements ==
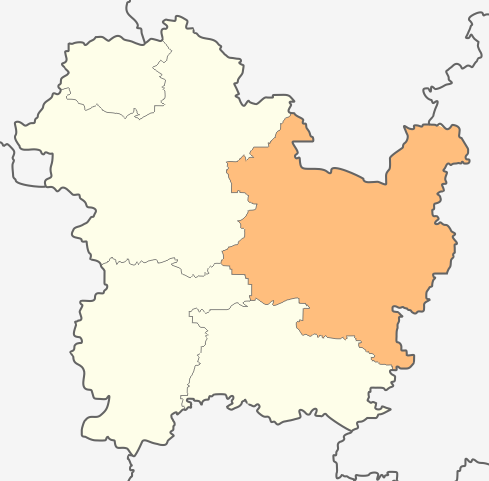
Targovishte Municipality within Targovishte Province

(towns are shown in bold): Population (December 2009)

- **Targovishte** - **Търговище** - 37,375
- Alvanovo - Алваново - 182
- Aleksandrovo - Александрово - 252
- Bayachevo - Баячево - 860
- Bistra - Бистра - 202
- Bozhurka - Божурка - 301
- Bratovo - Братово - 207
- Buynovo - Буйново - 665
- Buhovtsi - Буховци - 640
- Cherkovna - Черковна - 671
- Davidovo - Давидово - 461
- Draganovets - Драгановец - 507
- Dralfa - Дралфа - 617
- Dalgach - Дългач - 518
- Golyamo Novo - Голямо Ново - 1,241
- Golyamo Sokolovo - Голямо Соколово - 475
- Gorna Kabda - Горна Кабда - 69
- Koprets - Копрец - 244
- Koshnichari - Кошничари - 86
- Kralevo - Кралево - 975
- Krashno - Кръшно - 257
- Lilyak - Лиляк - 1,167
- Lovets - Ловец - 472
- Makariopolsko - Макариополско - 728
- Makovo - Маково - 298
- Miladinovtsi - Миладиновци - 228
- Mirovets - Мировец - 125
- Momino - Момино - 285
- Nadarevo - Надарево - 509
- Ovcharovo - Овчарово - 682
- Osen - Осен - 72
- Ostrets - Острец - 428
- Paydushko - Пайдушко - 239
- Pevets - Певец - 176
- Podgoritsa - Подгорица - 988
- Preselets - Преселец - 377
- Presiyan - Пресиян - 233
- Presyak - Пресяк - 212
- Probuda - Пробуда - 571
- Prolaz - Пролаз - 99
- Razboyna - Разбойна - 465
- Ralitsa - Ралица - 292
- Rosina - Росина - 336
- Ruets - Руец - 1,077
- Strazha - Стража - 771
- Saedinenie - Съединение - 367
- Tvardintsi - Твърдинци - 160
- Tarnovtsa - Търновца - 347
- Tsvetnitsa - Цветница - 103
- Vardun - Вардун - 1,013
- Vasil Levski - Васил Левски - 370
- Zdravets - Здравец - 502

== Demography ==
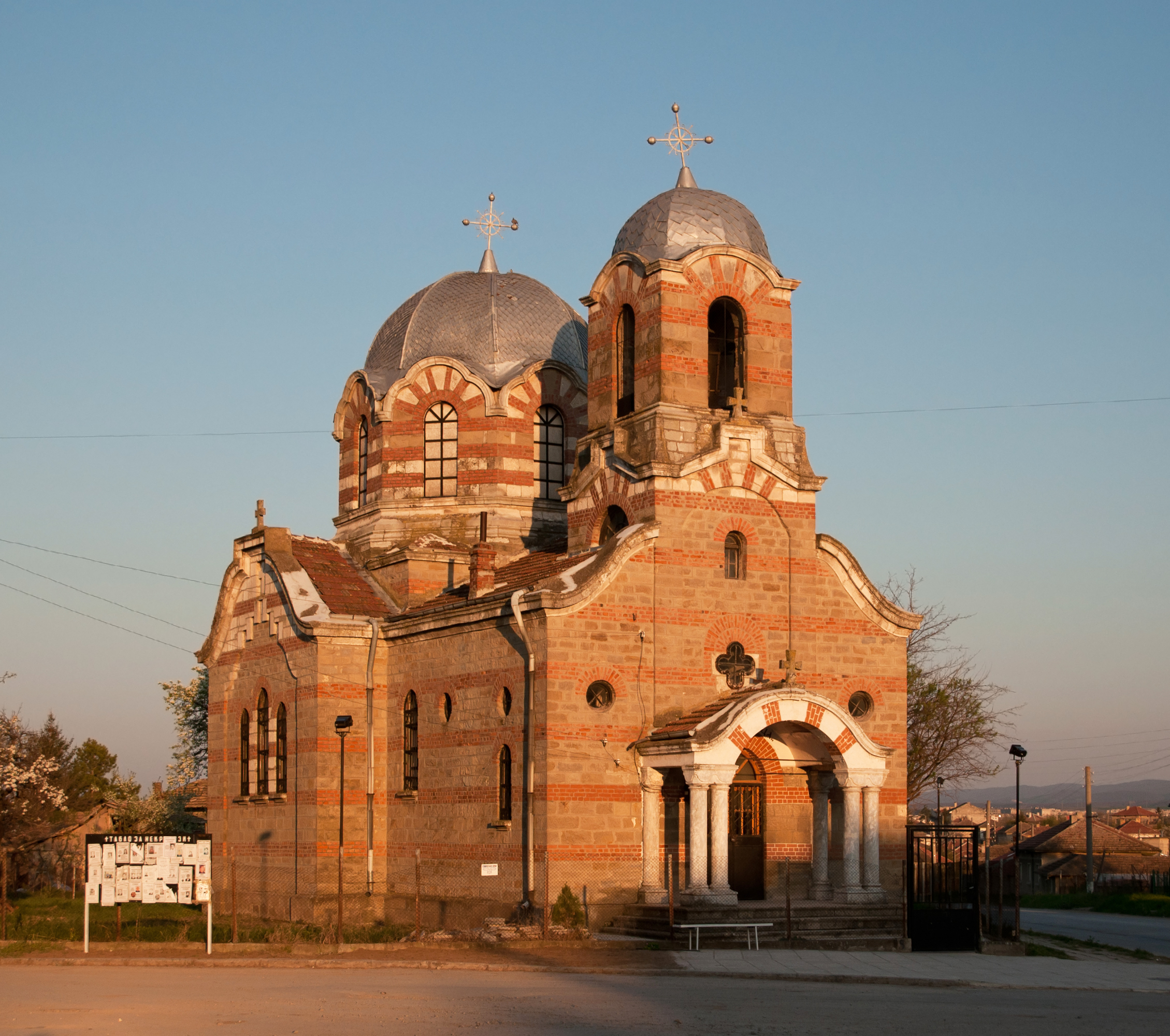
The Church of the Holy Trinity in Vabel, Targovishte.

The following table shows the change of the population during the last four decades. Since 1992 Targovishte Municipality has comprised the former municipalities of Dralfa and Makariopolsko and the numbers in the table reflect this unification.

Targovishte Municipality
Year	1975	1985	1992	2001	2005	2007	2009	2011
Population	62,069	66,502	70,355	60,890	62,188	61,458	60,497	57,264
Sources: Census 2001, Census 2011, „pop-stat.mashke.org“,

=== Ethnic composition ===
According to the 2011 census, among those who answered the optional question on ethnic identification, the ethnic composition of the municipality was the following:

Ethnic group	Population	Percentage
Bulgarians	33229	62.4%
Turks	14883	28%
Roma (Gypsy)	3902	7.3%
Other	594	1.1%
Undeclared	602	1.1%

Ethnic groups in the municipality of Tatgovishte (2011 census)
Ethnic group	Percentage
Bulgarians	62.4%
Turks	28.0%
Roma	7.3%
others and indefinable	2.2%

=== Religious composition ===
The religious composition, among those who answered the optional question on religious identification, according to the 2011 census, was the following: 58,8% is a member of the Bulgarian Orthodox Church, which makes Bulgarian Orthodox Christians the largest religious group in the municipality. The second largest religious group, with 30,1% of the total population, is the Muslim minority (Islam in Bulgaria). Around 7,5% preferred not to answer and a further 2,8% had no religion.

Religions in Targovishte Municipality (2011 census)
Religious group	Percentage
Orthodox Christian	58.8%
Muslim	30.1%
others and indefinable	11.1%

== See also ==
- Provinces of Bulgaria
- Municipalities of Bulgaria
- List of cities and towns in Bulgaria
