= Vardun =

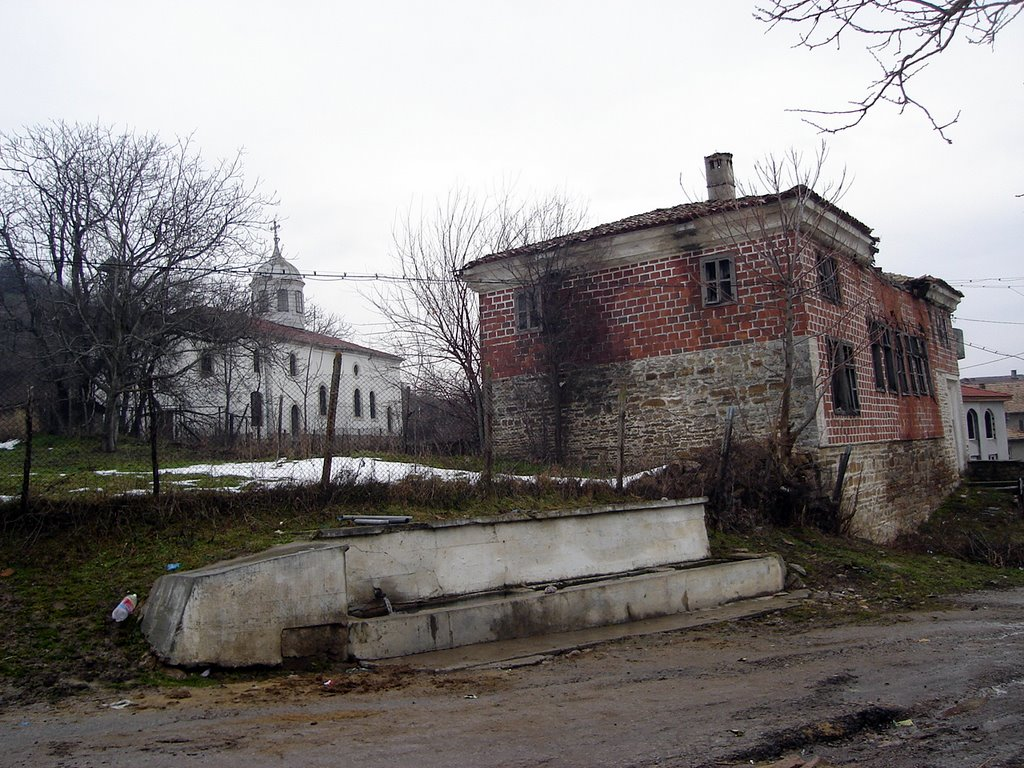
- Village church in Vardun

- Location within Bulgaria
- Coordinates: 43°8′2″N 26°32′2″E
- Country: Bulgaria
- Province: Targovishte
- Municipality: Targovishte

Population (as of 2021)
  - Total: 673

Vardun (Bulgarian: Вардун) is a village in Targovishte Municipality, Targovishte Province, Bulgaria.

== History ==
Until the 1980s, Vardun had over 300 Bulgarian and several Romani dwellings. It was separated from the village of Cherkovna. In the 1980s, urbanization processes encouraged many inhabitants to move to larger Bulgarian towns. Gradually, Romani people began to settle in Vardun and now form the majority of the population.

Vardun survived as a solely Bulgarian settlement during several waves of prosecutions against Bulgarians. After the disastrous Tarnovo rebellions (1593 and 1680), Turks converted many villages in the region to Islam. Many people from Vardun were killed or banished.

The Turkish Empire moved Muslim nomadic tribes from Asia to this region to replace its Bulgarian population and culture. Due to their statute of "Voynugans" (Войнуци), Vardunians had a privilege and advantage – they could own land. During the Turkish rule, the amount of Vardunian-owned land was greater than that owned by its neighbouring Muslim villages, with many Muslims working as farmhands on Vardunians' land.

In his History of Gabrovo as a settlement with a special martial statute, 12th to 19th centuries, Boris Stanimirov pointed out how freedom-loving and confident Vardun Bulgarians were. Having such virtues, they managed to put fear on Deliorman and Gerlovo Turks, demonstrating superiority to them.

In an Ottoman tax register from the 16th century, some men from Vardun were recorded with their titles. One of them was logotur (logotet) Bahno. With regard to this is the interpretation of Stefan Chureshki in his publication "The List of Bulgarian Princes", where he talks about a tzar’s inscription from 1281 found near Vardun. Two boyars were mentioned there – Pagan (or Gagan after another reading) and Hinto – according to their rule over "the mountain" (it is supposed to be the near Preslavska mountain).

== Location ==
Vardun is in the north of the Gerlovo area, a valley enclosed by the Balkans from the south, and by the Preslavska mountain from the northeast. Westward is the hilly Tozluk area and the Lisa mountain. Gerlovo was one of the most guarded regions in medieval Bulgaria: on the Preslavska mountain alone (about 20km away), remains of more than 10 strongholds have been found.

== Landmarks ==
Right next to Vardun, there were two strongholds: "Kaleto" (1,5km from Vardun), and "Erpeka" (about 2,5km from Vardun) which was built on an upland and had at least two fortified belts. Between both strongholds is situated a place named Holuma which was part of Vardun before the Turkish invasion. Other strongholds near Vardun entail the big stronghold "Gradishteto" (within 5km from Vardun before Prolaz) and "Hisarlaka" (near Paidushko village and within 7km from Vardun). The "Krumovo kale" stronghold or "Misionis", within 8km of the chief town of Targovishte, is the only excavated stronghold in the region.

These three strongholds kept guard over the Boaza passage. Eastwards there were also the big stronghold "Tepeto" (within 4km from Vardun) near Cherkovna, "Chanakkale" stronghold (within 9km from Vardun) near Tarnovca and "Kaleto" stronghold (within 6km from Vardun) near Koprec. Other strongholds situated in the Preslavska mountain, were "Beloto gradishte" in the Dervishki passage, the strongholds near villages Ovcharovo, Dolna Kabda and others inside the mountain.

In Gerlov the so called Tsika (or Chika) (Τζίκας) existed. A modern interpretation (based on unknown premises) claims that Tsika was the capital of the tribe of Severs. The chronicle of Theophanes the Confessor from the 9th century states that Tsika was the supposed capital (if a settlement is meant) or the inner (metropolitan) region of the Bulgarian state in which the palaces (αυλὴν) were located.

"The healing spring" is one of the largest attractions in the village of Vardun. According to legend, locals believe that the spring water can cure illnesses, including kidney and stomach problems.

== Honours ==
Vardun Point on Graham Land, Antarctica is named after the village.
