= Davidovo, Targovishte Province =

Davidovo
- Village
- Davidovo
- Location within Bulgaria
- Coordinates: 43.290697°N 26.561428°E
- Country: Bulgaria
- Province: Targovishte
- Municipality: Targovishte Municipality

Area
  - Total: 10.056 km^{2} (3.883 sq mi)
- Elevation: 177 m (581 ft)

Population
  - Total: 500
- Postal code: 7758
- Area code: 0601

Davidovo is a village in Northern Bulgaria. The village is \ in Targovishte Municipality, Targovishte Province. Аccording to the numbers provided by the 2020 Bulgarian census, Davidovo currently has a population of 500 people with a permanent address registered in the settlement.

== Geography ==
Davidovo village is \ in Municipality Targovishte. It lies 3 kilometers away from Targovishte and 127 kilometers away from Varna.

The village's elevation ranges between 100 and 199 meters and has an average elevation of 177 meters above sea level. The climate is continental.

The village is between green hills and a river passes through it. There are clearly pronounced 4 seasons including a hot summer, cold winter, sunny spring, and dry autumn.

== Infrastructure ==
The roads in the village are in a good condition. The nearest school is located in Targovishte. 13 kilometers away from Davidovo village, water dam Saedinenie can be found.

=== Buildings ===
- The local community center and library "Svetlina" were founded in 1927.
- There is a school for children with special needs.
- There is a park in the village.
- Local church
- Post office
- Futboll field, Buggy race tracks, sport facilities

== Ethnicity ==
According to the Bulgarian population census in 2011.

	Number	Percentage(in %)
Total	352	100.00
Bulgarians	154	43.75
Turks	47	13.35
Romani	141	40.05
Others	0	0
Do not define themselves	6	1.70
Unanswered	4	1.13
