= Bayachevo =

- Village
- Bayachevo
- Location within Bulgaria
- Coordinates: 43.229511°N 26.662876°E
- Country: Bulgaria
- Province: Targovishte
- Municipality: Targovishte Municipality

Area
  - Total: 15.369 km^{2} (5.934 sq mi)
- Elevation: 193 m (633 ft)

Population
  - Total: 916
- Postal code: 7745
- Area code: 06063

Bayachevo is a village in Northern Bulgaria. The village is in Targovishte Municipality, Targovishte Province. Аccording to the numbers provided by the 2020 Bulgarian census, Bayachevo has a population of 916 people with a permanent address registered in the settlement.

== Geography ==
Bayachevo village is located in Municipality Targovishte, 10 kilometers northeast away from Targovishte.

The village has an average elevation of 193 meters above sea level. The climate is continental. The total length of all streets within the village is 20 kilometers, making it one of the largest villages in Targovishte in terms of land area.

=== History ===
Bayachevo's name stems from a story dating back to the 16th century. Bayach comes from the word "Baene" which in the Bulgarian language means curing diseases or curses. According to the legend, there used to be a person in the village who occupied such a position.

== Infrastructure ==
=== Buildings ===
- There is a kindergarten in the village.
- The local community center and library were founded in 1927.

== Ethnicity ==
According to the Bulgarian population census in 2011.

	Number	Percentage(in %)
Total	759	100.00
Bulgarians	135	17.78
Turks	380	50.06
Romani	11	1.440
Others	0	0
Do not define themselves	29	3.82
Unanswered	204	26.87
