= Marchinko =

Marchinko is a surname. Notable people with the surname include:

- Brian Marchinko (1948–2014), Canadian ice hockey player
- Jhoni Marchinko, American television writer

== See also ==
- Marchenko
- Marchino
