= Alvanovo =

- Village
- Alvanovo
- Location within Bulgaria
- Coordinates: 43.29765°N 26.669555°E
- Country: Bulgaria
- Province: Targovishte
- Municipality: Targovishte Municipality

Area
  - Total: 14.86 km^{2} (5.74 sq mi)
- Elevation: 154 m (505 ft)

Population
  - Total: 166
- Postal code: 7752
- Area code: 06025

Alvanovo is a village in Northern Bulgaria. The village is in Targovishte Municipality, Targovishte Province. Аccording to the numbers provided by the 2020 Bulgarian census, Alvanovo currently has a population of 166 people with a permanent address registration in the settlement.

== Geography ==
Alvanovo village is located in Municipality Targovishte, 10 kilometers away from Targovishte and 9 kilometers away from Loznitsa. The village is near the Sofia–Varna highway.

The village has an average elevation of 154 meters above sea level. The climate is continental, while the highest and lowest temperatures for the area have been measured exactly in this village.

== Infrastructure ==
Alvanovo is the first village in Bulgaria with an online library. In 2011 the website library was built and became online.

Two years later, in 2013, the village created an online virtual museum.

=== Buildings ===
- The church "Sveta Troika" was built in 1896.
- The local school "Sv. Sv. Kiril I Metodii" was built in 1854.

== Ethnicity ==
According to the Bulgarian population census in 2011.

	Number	Percentage(in %)
Total	164	100.00
Bulgarians	159	98
Turks	0	0
Romani	0	0
Others	0	0
Do not define themselves	0	0
Unanswered	2	2
