= Rosen Vladimirov =

Bulgarian politician

Rosen Zlatanov Vladimirov (Bulgarian: Росен Златанов Владимиров) is a former regional governor of Sofia, Bulgaria, being in that position during the mayoralties of Stefan Sofianski and Mincho Gerdzhikov.

Since 2005 he has been the member of the National Assembly for the Targovishte constituency and parliamentary deputy chairman of the Movement for Rights and Freedoms
