= Aleksandrovo, Targovishte Province =

Aleksandrovo
- Village
- Aleksandrovo
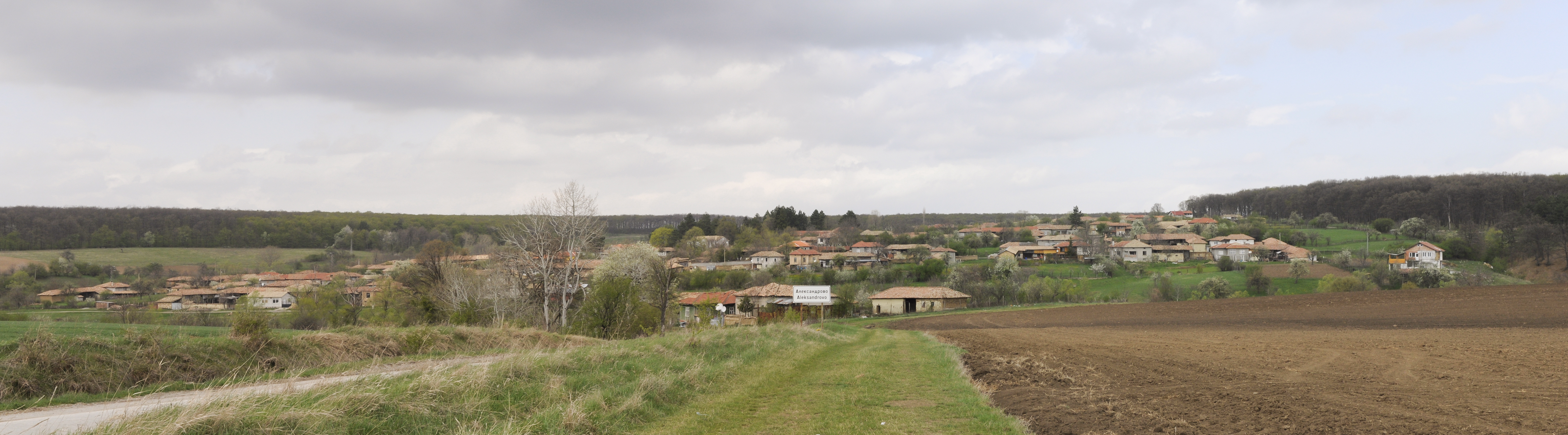
- View towards Aleksandrovo Village, Targovishte Municipality

- Location within Bulgaria
- Coordinates: 43.226784°N 26.424679°E
- Country: Bulgaria
- Province: Targovishte
- Municipality: Targovishte Municipality

Area
  - Total: 15,469 km^{2} (5,973 sq mi)
- Elevation: 442 m (1,450 ft)

Population
  - Total: 232
- Postal code: 7761
- Area code: 06020

Aleksandrovo is a village in Northern Bulgaria. The village is located in Targovishte Municipality, Targovishte Province. Аccording to the numbers provided by the 2020 Bulgarian census, Aleksandrovo currently has a population of 232 people with a permanent address registration in the settlement.

== Geography ==
Aleksandrovo village is in municipality Targovishte, 24 kilometers away from Pavlikeni. The river Studena passes close to the village.

The village thrives in the cultivation of sunflowers and corn.

The elevation of the village ranges between 300 and 499 meters and it has an average elevation of 442 meters above sea level.

== Buildings and infrastructure ==
- There is a mosque in the village.
- The local church "Sveti Dimitar" was built in 1910.
- The local community hall and library "Georgi Parvanov" is still acting

== Ethnicity ==
According to the Bulgarian population census in 2011.

	Number	Percentage(in %)
Total	254	100.00
Bulgarians	28	13
Turks	225	87
Romani	0	0
Others	0	0
Do not define themselves	0	0
Unanswered	0	0
