= Draganovets =

- Village
- Draganovets
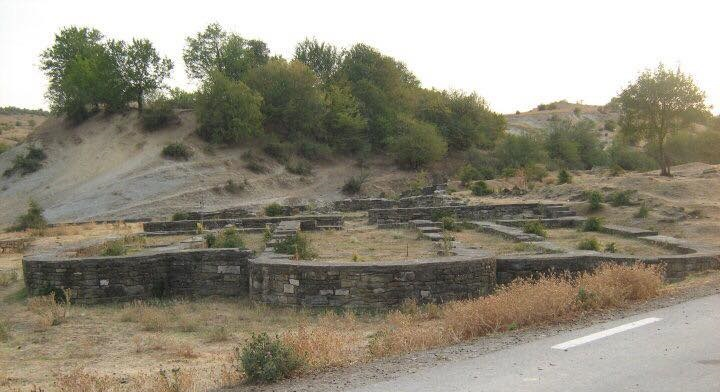
- The ancient basilika remains found in Draganovets village

- Location within Bulgaria
- Coordinates: 43.093248°N 26.670183°E
- Country: Bulgaria
- Province: Targovishte
- Municipality: Targovishte Municipality

Area
  - Total: 14.471 km^{2} (5.587 sq mi)
- Elevation: 219 m (719 ft)

Population
  - Total: 501
- Postal code: 7773
- Area code: 06003

Draganovets is a village in Northern Bulgaria. The village is located in Targovishte Municipality, Targovishte Province. Аccording to the numbers provided by the 2020 Bulgarian census, Draganovets currently has a population of 501 people with a permanent address registered in the settlement.

== Geography ==
Draganovets village is in Municipality Targovishte, 25 kilometers South away from Targovishte.

The continental climate makes the area perfect for the main occupation of the local population which is tobacco harvest and animal husbandry.

The elevation of the village ranges between 200 and 299 meters with an average elevation of 219 meters above sea level.

== History ==
The remains of a Neolithic village and fortress were found 2 kilometers south from Draganovets. Moreover, in the same area, Thracian remains were archeologically excavated. They date back to the 2nd–4th centuries.

In the same area, around the 5th century a Christian temple had been elevated. According to the archeologists and historians who worked on the site, the temple they found is the only five-nave church in Bulgaria.

== Buildings and infrastructure ==
The roads leading toward Draganovets village are in poor condition. But there is a functioning school in the village and daily public transport toward Omurtag.

- Elementary school "Sv.sv Kiril i Metodii" was founded in 1888.
- An active kindergarten "Number 5, The red riding hood”
- The local community center and library "Hristo Botev" was founded in 1927.

== Ethnicity ==
According to the Bulgarian population census in 2011.

	Number	Percentage(in %)
Total	468	100.00
Bulgarians	15	3.20
Turks	268	57.26
Romani	180	38.46
Others	0	0
Do not define themselves	5	1.06
Unanswered	0	0
