= Dalgach =

- Village
- Dalgach
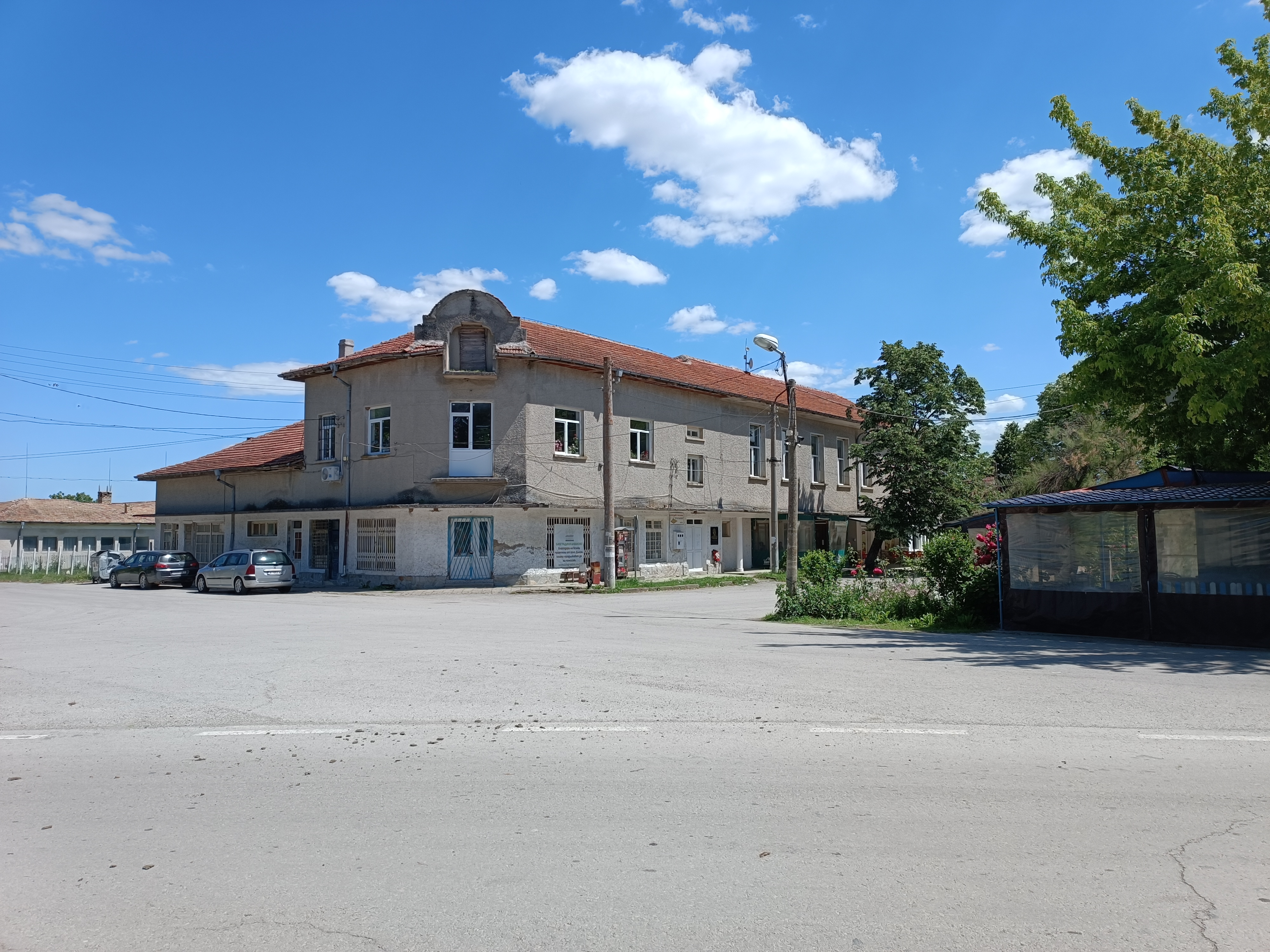
- Dalgach ploshtad

- Location within Bulgaria
- Coordinates: 43.216736°N 26.7240104°E
- Country: Bulgaria
- Province: Targovishte
- Municipality: Targovishte Municipality

Area
  - Total: 13.673 km^{2} (5.279 sq mi)
- Elevation: 174 m (571 ft)

Population
  - Total: 484
- Postal code: 7742
- Area code: 06029

Dalgach is a village in Northern Bulgaria. The village is located in Targovishte Municipality, Targovishte Province. Аccording to the numbers provided by the 2020 Bulgarian census, Dalgach currently has a population of 484 people with a permanent address registered in the settlement.

== Geography ==
Dalgach village is in Municipality Targovishte. It is located 14 kilometers east of Targovishte.

The elevation of the village ranges between 100 and 199 meters with an average elevation of 174 meters above sea level. The village's climate is continental. There is a river called Dalgach dere which passes near the village.

In the village's area, the geographical area "Idirizova Koriya" can be found. Idirizova Koriya is a group of centenarian trees with an average age of more than 150 years. Some of the trees are over 300 years old.

== History ==
There are archeological sites near the village, one kilometer southeast from Dalgach. The site is on the right bank of Dalgach Dere river.

There is a settlement historical mound which can be found there with a large size of diameter over 50 meters and 70 meters in height.

== Buildings and infrastructure ==
In 2016, the village won the competition of Targovishte Municipality regarding the best Christmas decoration.

- The local community hall and library "Saglasie" is still acting
- There is a Kindergarten "Nezabravka" in Dalgach village.

== Ethnicity ==
According to the Bulgarian population census in 2011.

	Number	Percentage(in %)
Total	500	100.00
Bulgarians	36	7.20
Turks	9	1.80
Romani	0	0
Others	182	36.40
Do not define themselves	0	0
Unanswered	272	54.40
