= Bratovo, Targovishte Province =

Bratovo
- Village
- Bratovo
- Location within Bulgaria
- Coordinates: 43.18102°N 26.410942°E
- Country: Bulgaria
- Province: Targovishte
- Municipality: Targovishte Municipality

Area
  - Total: 11.675 km^{2} (4.508 sq mi)
- Elevation: 479 m (1,572 ft)

Population
  - Total: 243
- Postal code: 7764
- Area code: 06068

Bratovo is a village in Northern Bulgaria, in Targovishte Municipality, Targovishte Province. According to the 2020 Bulgarian census, Bratovo has a population of 243 people with a permanent address registered in the settlement.

== Geography ==
The village lies between two geographical areas: the Balkan Mountains and the Danubian Plain (Bulgaria).

Bratovo village is in Municipality Targovishte, 10 kilometers northeast from Targovishte.

The village's elevation ranges between 300 and 499 meters with an average elevation of 479 meters above sea level. The climate is continental.

== Infrastructure ==
In 2019 Targovishte Municipality invested in the restoration of the village's ritual hall.

=== Buildings ===
- There is a kindergarten in the village.
- There is a local community center and library "Prosveta". It is still active.
- There used to be an elementary school "Sv. Sv. Kiril i Metodii" but it was closed in 1997.

== Ethnicity ==
According to the Bulgarian population census in 2011.

| | Number | Percentage(in %) |
| Total | 196 | 100.00 |
| Bulgarians | 0 | 0 |
| Turks | 152 | 77.52 |
| Romani | 0 | 0 |
| Others | 0 | 0 |
| Do not define themselves | 0 | 0 |
| Unanswered | 43 | 21.93 |
