= Marchino =

Marchino is a surname. Notable people with the surname include:

- Mary Anne Marchino (1938–2021), American swimmer
- Nathalie Marchino (born 1981), American rugby union player

== See also ==
- Marchinko
