= Bistra, Targovishte Province =

Bistra
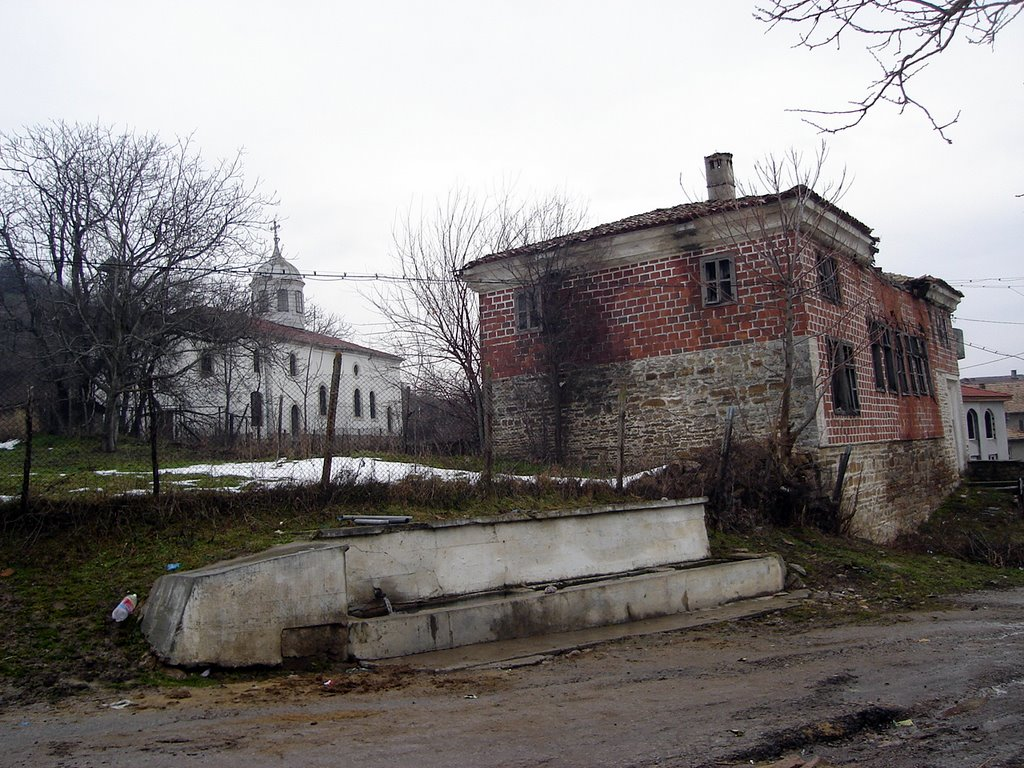

- Location within Bulgaria
- Coordinates: 43°20′N 026°34′E
- Country: Bulgaria
- Province: Targovishte
- Municipality: Targovishte

Population (2021)
  - Total: 185

Bistra (Bulgarian: Бистра) is a village in northeastern Bulgaria, in the Targovishte Municipality of the Targovishte Province.

Bistra Glacier on Smith Island in the South Shetland Islands, Antarctica is named after the village.
