= Makovo, Bulgaria =

Makovo Маково Makowo, Kochashlii
- Location of Makovo
- Coordinates: 43°22′01″N 26°28′01″E
- Country: Bulgaria
- Provinces (Oblast): Targovishte
- Municipality (Obshtina): Targovishte

Population (2009)
  - Total: 298
- Time zone: UTC+2 (EET)
  - Summer (DST): UTC+3 (EEST)

Makovo (Makowo, Kochashlii) is a village in Targovishte Municipality, Targovishte Province, Bulgaria. As of 2009 it had a population of 298.

== History ==
Archaeological excavations have shown that the village existed at least as far back as the 7th century CE as part of the Byzantine Empire. When Bulgaria became independent, the village was entirely Muslim, and it remains mostly so to this day. The first mayor was elected in 1883 and the first school was opened in 1898. In 1909 a mill was built.
