= Cherkovna, Targovishte Province =

Cherkovna
- Village
- Cherkovna
- Location within Bulgaria
- Coordinates: 43.147547°N 26.56984°E
- Country: Bulgaria
- Province: Targovishte
- Municipality: Targovishte Municipality

Area
  - Total: 15.919 km^{2} (6.146 sq mi)
- Elevation: 351 m (1,152 ft)

Population
  - Total: 646
- Postal code: 7781
- Area code: 06001

Cherkovna is a village in Northern Bulgaria, in Targovishte Municipality, Targovishte Province. Аccording to the 2020 Bulgarian census, Cherkovna has a population of 646 people with a permanent address registered in the settlement.

== Geography ==
Cherkovna village is in Municipality Targovishte. There is a point in Antarctica, Barilari Bay, Graham Coast, named after the village of Cherkovna.

The village is in the geographical area Gerlovo, 4 kilometers away South from dam Cherkovna. The elevation of the village ranges between 300 and 499 meters with an average elevation of 351 meters above sea level. The village's climate is continental.

== Buildings and infrastructure ==
There are three main roads that stem from the village toward Koprets (3.5 km), Strazha (6 km) and Vardun (4 km).

The active buildings in the village are.

- The local community hall and library "Svetlina" was built in 1927 and is still acting.

== Ethnicity ==
According to the Bulgarian population census in 2011.

	Number	Percentage(in %)
Total	632	100.00
Bulgarians	0	0
Turks	628	99.36
Romani	0	0
Others	0	0
Do not define themselves	0	0
Unanswered	3	0.47
