= Bratovo, Burgas Province =

Village in Burgas, Bulgaria

Bratovo Братово
- Bratovo
- Location of Bratovo
- Coordinates: 42°30′N 27°18′E
- Country: Bulgaria
- Provinces (Oblast): Burgas Municipality

Population (2022)
  - Total: ▲374
- Time zone: UTC+2 (EET)
  - Summer (DST): UTC+3 (EEST)
- ZIP Code: 8111

Bratovo (Bulgarian: Братово) is a village in Burgas Municipality, Bulgaria. It is about 7 km outside Burgas city centre.

Agriculture is also a major economic activity in Bratovo.

Bratovo also has its own microclimate and always seems to be a few degrees warmer than many of its surrounding neighbours. The telephone code to the village of Bratovo is 0562732 from Bulgaria and international is 00359562732.

== Demographics ==
According to 2011 Bulgarian census the village had 146 people in total.

Ethnicity	Count
Bulgarians	42
Turks	-
Romanians	-
Not stated	104

The village had 374 people in 2022.
