= Prolaz =

Prolaz Пролаз
- Village
- Location within Bosnia and Herzegovina
- Coordinates: 43°39′38″N 19°05′09″E
- Country: Bosnia and Herzegovina
- Republic: Republika Srpska
- Municipality: Novo Goražde
- Time zone: UTC+1 (CET)
  - Summer (DST): UTC+2 (CEST)

Prolaz (Cyrillic: Пролаз) is a village in the municipality of Novo Goražde, Republika Srpska, Bosnia and Herzegovina. The name Prolaz can be translated from Bosnian to English to mean passage.
