= Buhovtsi =

Buhovtsi Буховци
- Village

Other transcription(s)
  - from Bulgarian: Bukhovtsi, Buhovtzi, Buhovci
- Location of Buhovtsi
- Coordinates: 43°18′44″N 26°42′32″E
- Country: Bulgaria
- Province (Oblast): Targovishte
- Municipality: Targovishte

Government
  - Mayor: Zdravka

Area
  - Total: 24.246 km^{2} (9.361 sq mi)

Population (2007)
  - Total: 652
  - Density: 26.9/km^{2} (69.6/sq mi)
- Time zone: UTC+2 (EET)
  - Summer (DST): UTC+3 (EEST)
- Postal Code: 7757
- Area code: 06021

Buhovtsi (Bulgarian: Буховци, also transcribed as Bukhovtsi, Buhovtzi or Buhovci) is a village in northeastern Bulgaria, in the Targovishte Municipality of the Targovishte Province.
