= Dralfa =

- Village
- Dralfa
- Location within Bulgaria
- Coordinates: 43.335995°N 26.433562°E
- Country: Bulgaria
- Province: Targovishte
- Municipality: Targovishte Municipality

Area
  - Total: 11.68 km^{2} (4.51 sq mi)
- Elevation: 212 m (696 ft)

Population
  - Total: 587
- Postal code: 7782
- Area code: 06027

Dralfa is a village in Northern Bulgaria. The village is in Targovishte Municipality, Targovishte Province. Аccording to the numbers provided by the 2020 Bulgarian census, Dralfa currently has a population of 587 people with a permanent address registered in the settlement.

== Geography ==
The village lies between two geographical areas – the Balkan Mountains and the Danubian Plain (Bulgaria).

Dralfa village is located in Municipality Targovishte, 17 kilometers northwest away from Targovishte. The village is a railway station for the busiest railway line in Bulgaria, Sofia – Varna.

Dralfa's continental climate offers good conditions for animal husbandry, pig and sheep breeding.

A very large area of the village's land is used for the production of crops like wheat and corn.

The village's elevation ranges between 200 and 299 meters with an average elevation of 212 meters above sea level.

== Infrastructure ==
There is an active bakery in the village, supplying the nearby 10 villages with bread. A Thracian historical mound was found near the village, which was a burial site dating back to the 4th century.

=== Buildings ===
- There is a local community center and library "Napredak". It was built in 1903. It is still active.
- The elementary school "Sv. sv. Kiril i Metodii" is active in the village and was built in 1891. Rebuilt in 1970.

== Ethnicity ==
According to the Bulgarian population census in 2011.

	Number	%
Total	391	100.00
Bulgarians	177	45.26
Turks	171	43.73
Romani	23	5.88
Others	5	1.27
Do not define themselves	10	2.55
Unanswered	5	1.27
