= Northern Bulgaria =

Region of Bulgaria

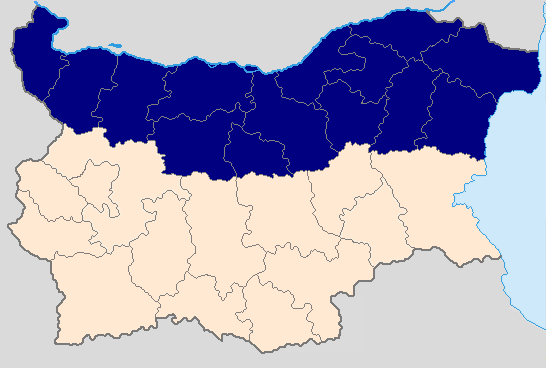
Northern Bulgaria

Northern Bulgaria (Bulgarian: Северна България, romanized: Severna Bylgarija), also called Moesia (Bulgarian: Мизия, Mizija) is the northern half of Bulgaria, located to the north of the main ridge of the Balkan Mountains which conventionally separates the country into a northern and a southern part.

== Geography ==
Besides the Balkan Mountains, Northern Bulgaria borders the Timok River and Serbia to the west, the Danube River and Romania to the north, and the Bulgarian Black Sea Coast to the east.

Geographically, the region's terrain is relatively uniform, dominated by the hilly Danubian Plain, with some low plateaus to the east. Northern Bulgaria covers an area of 48,596 square kilometres and has a population of 2,674,347 according to the 2011 census (36% of Bulgaria's entire population), with a population density of 55 people per km². The three largest cities are Varna, Rousse and Pleven.

=== Provinces ===
Administratively, Northern Bulgaria includes the following 14 Bulgarian provinces:

- Dobrich Province
- Gabrovo Province
- Lovech Province
- Montana Province
- Pleven Province
- Razgrad Province
- Rousse Province
- Shumen Province
- Silistra Province
- Targovishte Province
- Varna Province
- Veliko Tarnovo Province
- Vidin Province
- Vratsa Province

Parts of Burgas Province, Sliven Province, and Sofia Province also geographically belong to Northern Bulgaria.

Northern Bulgaria covers the historical region of Moesia, which in turn includes several sub-regions such as Dobruja (sometimes not considered part of Moesia), Ludogorie, Gerlovo and Zlatiya. Northern Bulgaria is also conventionally divided into Northwestern, Central Northern and Northeastern Bulgaria, with slightly varying borders. The lower northern reaches of the Balkan Mountains are called the Fore-Balkan, as opposed to the Sub-Balkan valleys to the south of the main ridge. In Antiquity, the Jireček Line divided Latin (in the north) and Ancient Greek (in the south) language influence in the Balkans, with Northern Bulgaria to the north of it and Southern Bulgaria to the south. Much later, after the Liberation of Bulgaria in 1878, all of Northern Bulgaria and the region of Sofia became the Principality of Bulgaria while most of the rest of Southern Bulgaria was part of Eastern Rumelia until the Bulgarian unification in 1885.

== Gallery ==
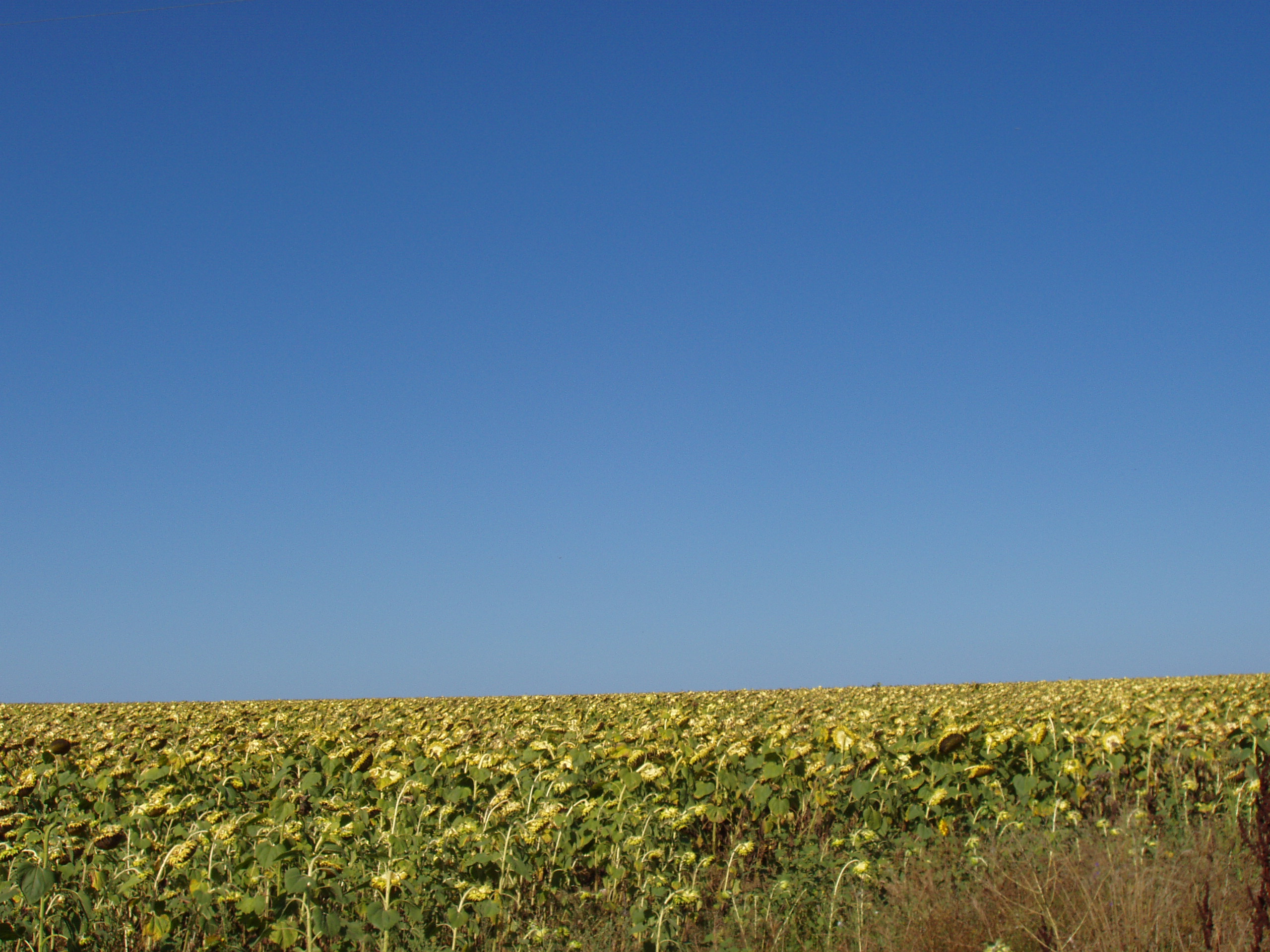
The fertile plains of Dobruja

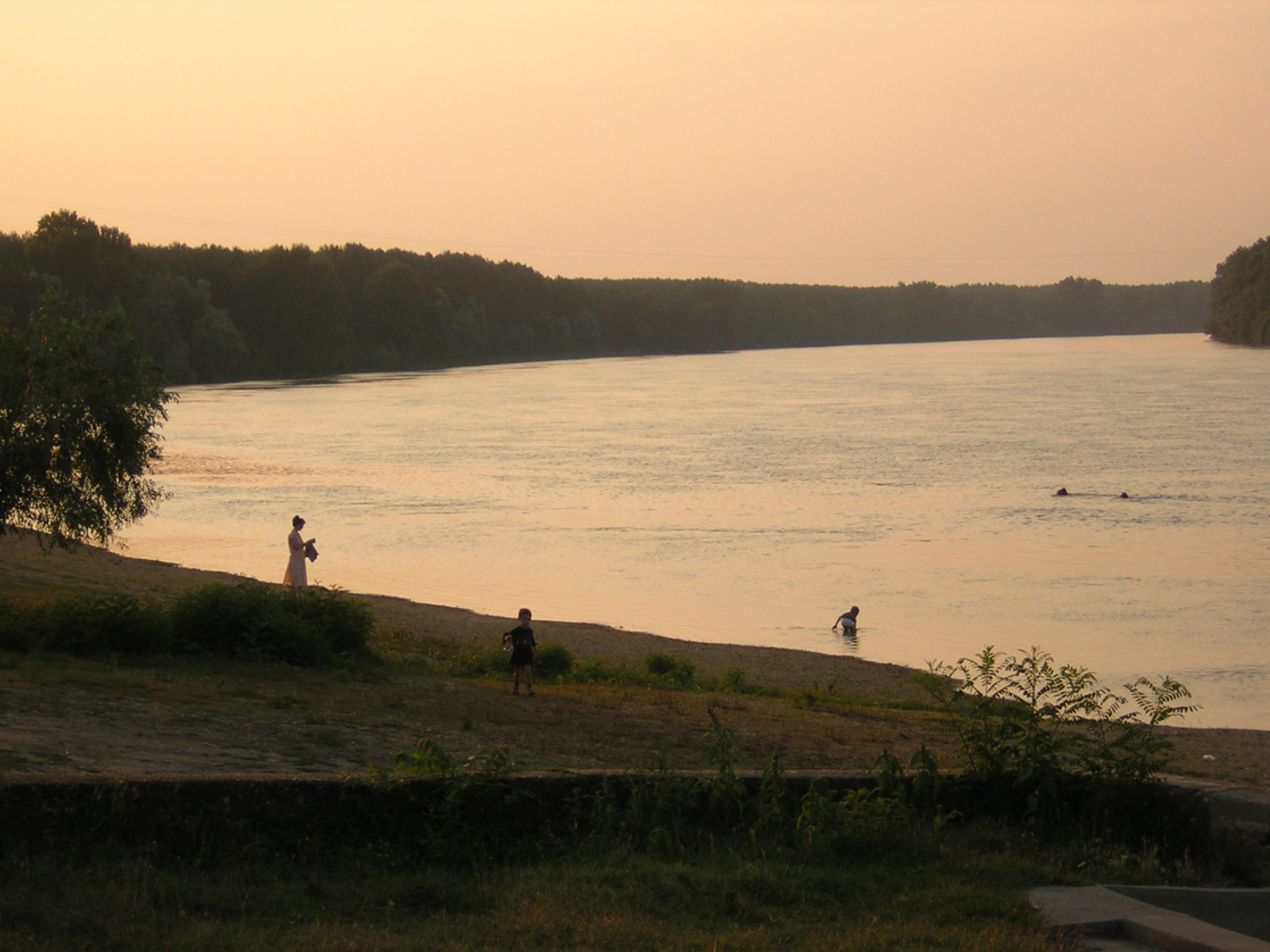
The Danube at Belene

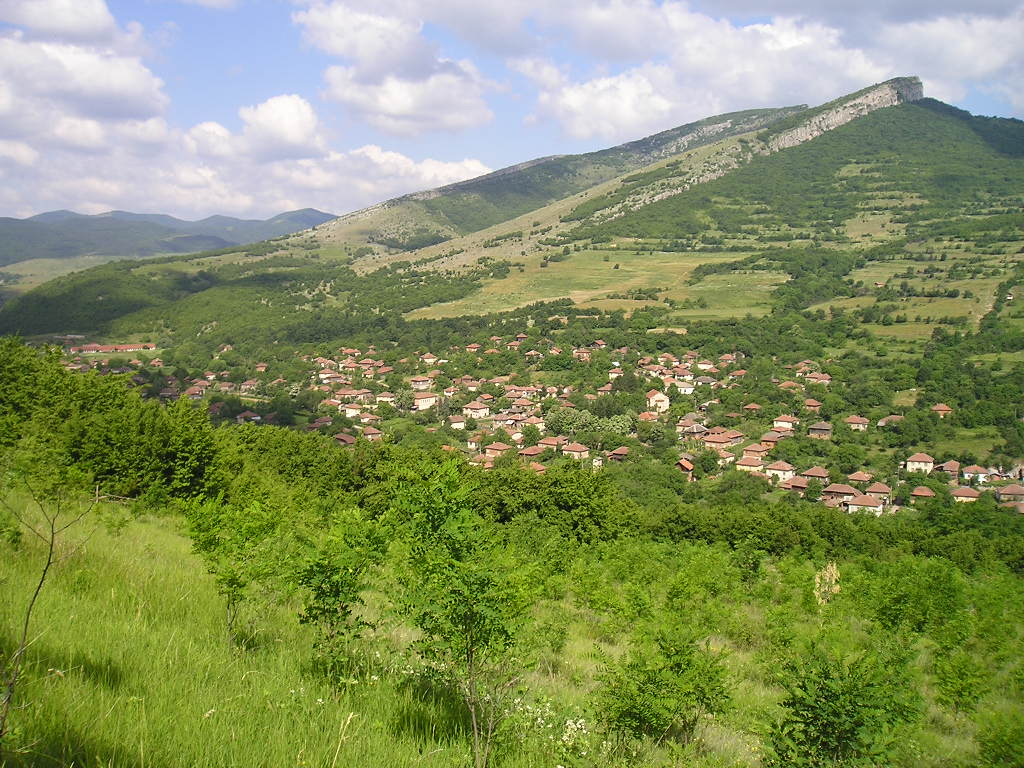
A village in the northwestern reaches of the Balkan Mountains

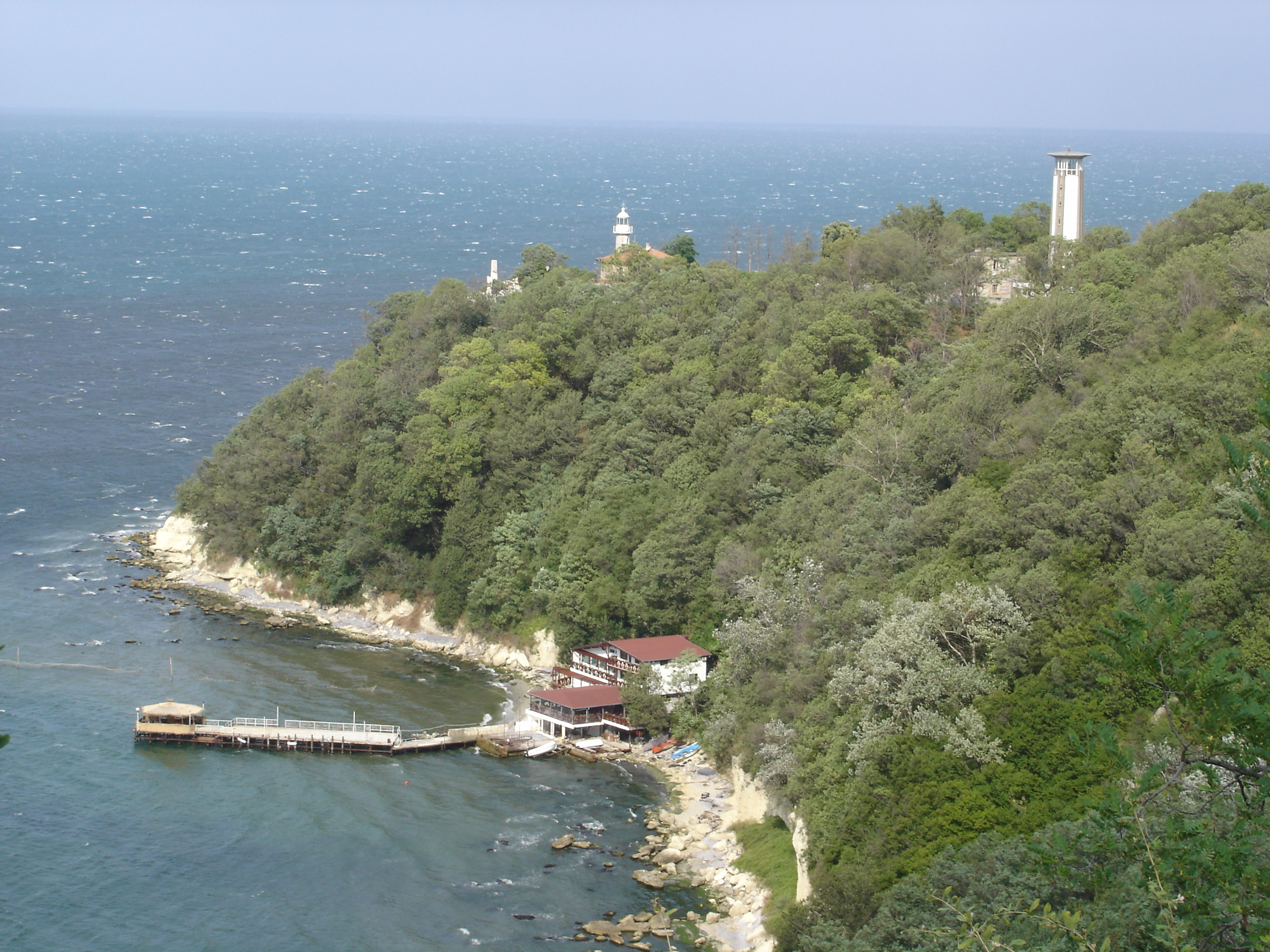
The Bulgarian Black Sea Coast near Varna

== See also ==
- Southern Bulgaria
