= Borovo =

Borovo may refer to:

== Places ==
=== Bulgaria ===
- Borovo, Ruse Province, town in Ruse Province
- Borovo Municipality, Bulgaria, municipality in Ruse Province
- Borovo, Blagoevgrad Province, village in Blagoevgrad Province
- Borovo, Plovdiv Province, village in Plovdiv Province
- Borovo, Stara Zagora Province, village in Stara Zagora Province
- Borovo, Sofia, neighbourhood in the Krasno selo

=== Other ===
- Borovo, Croatia, village and municipality in Vukovar-Syrmia County, Croatia
- Borovo Naselje, part of Vukovar, Croatia
- Borovo, Kriva Palanka, village in Kriva Palanka Municipality, North Macedonia
- Borovo (Kraljevo), village in Kraljevo Municipality, Serbia

== Other ==
- Borovo (company), Croatian leather and rubber products company
