= List of cities and towns in Bulgaria =

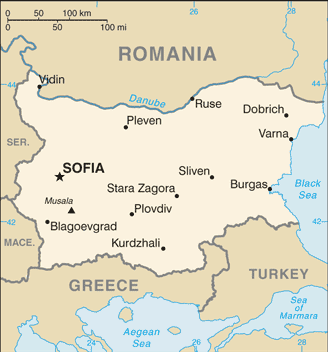
Map of Bulgaria

This is a complete list of all cities in Bulgaria sorted by population. Province capitals are shown in bold. Primary sources are the National Statistical Institute (NSI) and the Bulgarian Academy of Sciences.

The largest city is Sofia, with about 1.4 million inhabitants, and the smallest is Melnik, with about 300. Towns are not necessarily larger than all villages. Indeed, many villages are more populous than many towns – compare for instance Lozen, a large village with more than 6,000 inhabitants, with Melnik.

== List ==
Rank	CoA	City/Town	Province (Oblast)	Population 1946	Population 1992 census	Population 2001 census	Population 2011 census	Population 2021 census	Population 2024 official	Image
1		**Sofia**	Sofia City Province	366,801	1,114,925	1,091,772	1,204,685	1,183,454	1,205,548	
2		**Plovdiv**	Plovdiv Province	126,563	341,058	338,224	338,153	319,612	329,489	
3		**Varna**	Varna Province	76,954	308,432	312,889	334,870	310,664	318,737	
4		**Burgas**	Burgas Province	44,449	195,686	192,390	200,271	189,741	189,014	
5		**Stara Zagora**	Stara Zagora Province	38,325	150,518	143,420	138,272	122,536	121,582	
6		**Ruse**	Ruse Province	57,509	170,038	161,453	149,642	124,787	121,168	
7		**Pleven**	Pleven Province	39,059	130,812	122,149	106,954	92,101	88,565	
8		**Sliven**	Sliven Province	34,291	106,212	100,366	91,620	80,467	78,232	
9		**Dobrich**	Dobrich Province	30,522	104,494	100,000	91,030	73,895	69,434	
10		**Shumen**	Shumen Province	31,327	93,390	89,054	80,855	67,971	66,641	
11		**Pernik**	Pernik Province	28,545	90,549	86,133	80,191	68,259	65,799	
12		**Haskovo**	Haskovo Province	27,435	80,700	80,870	76,397	65,829	63,314	
13		**Blagoevgrad**	Blagoevgrad Province	14,200	71,476	71,361	70,881	62,524	62,670	
14		**Yambol**	Yambol Province	30,576	91,497	82,924	74,132	60,641		
15		**Veliko Tarnovo**	Veliko Tarnovo Province	16,223	67,540	66,998	72,653	59,166		
16		**Pazardzhik**	Pazardzhik Province	30,376	82,578	78,855	71,979	55,220		
17		**Vratsa**	Vratsa Province	19,620	75,518	69,423	60,692	49,569		
18		Asenovgrad	Plovdiv Province	20,952	52,360	52,116	50,846	45,473		
19		**Gabrovo**	Gabrovo Province	21,180	76,522	67,350	58,930	44,786		
20		Kazanluk	Stara Zagora Province	20,096	60,095	54,021	47,325	41,768		
21		**Kardzhali**	Kardzhali Province	10,502	45,793	45,729	43,880	40,937		
22		**Montana**	Montana Province	8,049	52,476	49,368	43,781	36,633		
23		**Kyustendil**	Kyustendil Province	19,238	54,431	50,243	44,532	35,100		
24		**Vidin**	Vidin Province	18,481	62,691	57,614	48,071	34,797		
25		**Targovishte**	Targovishte Province	10,561	43,016	40,775	37,611	32,957		
26		Dimitrovgrad	Haskovo Province	–	50,977	45,918	38,785	31,187		
27		**Razgrad**	Razgrad Province	15,010	40,933	39,036	33,880	28,509		
28		**Lovech**	Lovech Province	11,829	48,242	44,262	36,600	27,910		
29		**Silistra**	Silistra Province	15,951	48,360	42,153	35,607	27,727		
30		Dupnitsa	Kyustendil Province	19,301	41,398	38,323	35,506	26,973		
31		Petrich	Blagoevgrad Province	13,493	27,659	29,785	29,836	26,093		
32		Gorna Oryahovitsa	Veliko Tarnovo Province	10,488	38,914	35,621	32,079	25,764		
33		**Smolyan**	Smolyan Province	5,406	34,086	33,153	30,642	24,920		
34		Samokov	Sofia Province	13,218	28,608	27,664	26,061	24,186		
35		Sandanski	Blagoevgrad Province	7,447	26,096	26,695	26,959	23,844		
36		Velingrad	Pazardzhik Province	–	25,634	25,009	23,479	20,031		
37		Sevlievo	Gabrovo Province	9,827	25,494	24,775	23,908			
38		Lom	Montana Province	15,255	31,133	27,897	23,836	18,593		
39		Karlovo	Plovdiv Province	8,903	27,291	25,715	23,797	19,373		
40		Velingrad	Pazardzhik Province	–	25,634	25,009	23,479	20,286		
41		Nova Zagora	Sliven Province	10,988	26,260	25,453	23,325			
42		Troyan	Lovech Province	5,206	25,104	23,332	21,723			
43		Aytos	Burgas Province	9,929	22,401	21,339	20,930			
44		Botevgrad	Sofia Province	6,079	23,006	21,545	20,444			
45		Gotse Delchev	Blagoevgrad Province	14,358	20,454	20,426	19,721			
46		Peshtera	Pazardzhik Province	8,938	19,280	19,411	19,288			
47		Harmanli	Haskovo Province	9,225	21,349	19,927	18,360			
48		Karnobat	Burgas Province	10,265	21,917	20,587	18,214			
49		Svilengrad	Haskovo Province	9,686	18,643	18,982	18,005			
50		Panagyurishte	Pazardzhik Province	12,014	21,131	19,994	17,675			
51		Chirpan	Stara Zagora Province	13,220	19,940	18,022	16,133			
52		Popovo	Targovishte Province	6,525	19,722	17,791	15,286			
53		Rakovski	Plovdiv Province	–	15,799	16,184	15,052			
54		Radomir	Pernik Province	5,783	16,909	15,631	13,873			
55		Novi Iskar	Sofia City Province	–	–	–	13,855			
56		Kozloduy	Vratsa Province	–	13,632	14,871	13,752			
57		Parvomay	Plovdiv Province	5,050	16,809	15,266	13,733			
58		Berkovitsa	Montana Province	6,876	16,146	15,459	13,721			
59		Cherven Bryag	Pleven Province	5,244	18,003	15,792	13,634			
60		Pomorie	Burgas Province	4,823	13,946	13,641	13,432			
61		Ihtiman	Sofia Province	6,526	12,926	13,615	13,297			
62		Radnevo	Stara Zagora Province	–	14,447	14,595	13,207			
63		Provadiya	Varna Province	8,729	15,251	14,141	12,766			
64		Novi Pazar	Shumen Province	5,477	14,284	13,542	12,613			
65		Razlog	Blagoevgrad Province	6,912	13,422	12,614	12,472			
66		Byala Slatina	Vratsa Province	9,324	15,995	13,832	12,289			
67		Nesebar	Burgas Province	2,286	8,604	8,789	12,133			
68		Balchik	Dobrich Province	6,131	12,235	12,448	12,127			
69		Kostinbrod	Sofia Province	–	12,123	12,120	11,896			
70		Stamboliyski	Plovdiv Province	–	13,015	12,490	11,575			
71		Kavarna	Dobrich Province	5,652	12,139	11,479	11,340			
72		Knezha	Pleven Province	13,035	13,690	12,658	11,063			
73		Pavlikeni	Veliko Tarnovo Province	6,383	13,996	12,879	10,850			
74		Mezdra	Vratsa Province	–	13,006	12,387	10,769			
75		Etropole	Sofia Province	3,021	12,078	11,371	10,750			
76		Levski	Pleven Province	5,122	13,178	12,166	10,528			
77		Teteven	Lovech Province	4,817	12,567	11,427	10,429			
78		Elhovo	Yambol Province	6,720	13,776	12,070	10,367			
79		Bankya	Sofia City Province	–	–	–	10,126			
80		Tryavna	Gabrovo Province	4,355	12,491	11,131	9,569			
81		Lukovit	Lovech Province	7,751	10,505	10,002	9,535			
82		Tutrakan	Silistra Province	7,183	11,573	10,322	9,371			
83		Sredets	Burgas Province	–	10,464	9,548	9,122			
84		Sopot	Plovdiv Province	3,644	11,774	9,926	9,076			
85		Byala	Ruse Province	6,352	11,222	10,006	8,890			
86		Veliki Preslav	Shumen Province	4,127	9,969	9,328	8,886			
87		Isperih	Razgrad Province	–	10,494	9,953	8,829			
88		Belene	Pleven Province	–	10,453	9,903	8,761			
89		Omurtag	Targovishte Province	4,233	8,938	8,893	8,612			
90		Bansko	Blagoevgrad Province	6,161	9,385	9,204	8,562			
91		Krichim	Plovdiv Province	–	8,761	8,544	8,463			
92		Galabovo	Stara Zagora Province	–	9,507	9,166	8,425			
93		Devnya	Varna Province	–	8,412	8,648	8,369			
94		Septemvri	Pazardzhik Province	–	9,361	8,937	8,320			
95		Rakitovo	Pazardzhik Province	–	8,417	8,442	8,277			
96		Lyaskovets	Veliko Tarnovo Province	5,541	10,050	9,109	8,164			
97		Svoge	Sofia Province	–	8,410	8,559	8,033			
98		Aksakovo	Varna Province	–	7,039	7,283	7,978			
99		Kubrat	Razgrad Province	–	9,906	9,045	7,898			
100		Dryanovo	Gabrovo Province	3,764	9,673	8,655	7,892			
101		Beloslav	Varna Province	–	7,970	8,071	7,878			
102		Pirdop	Sofia Province	–	8,566	8,372	7,651			
103		Lyubimets	Haskovo Province	–	8,499	8,163	7,587			
104		Momchilgrad	Kardzhali Province	3,143	7,266	7,948	7,542			
105		Slivnitsa	Sofia Province	–	8,455	7,878	7,333			
106		Hisarya	Plovdiv Province	–	9,149	8,299	7,239			
107		Zlatograd	Smolyan Province	4,182	8,831	7,887	7,077			
108		Kostenets	Sofia Province	–	10,866	9,954	7,018			
109		Devin	Smolyan Province	2,695	6,411	7,485	6,996			
110		General Toshevo	Dobrich Province	–	8,955	8,042	6,979			
111		Simeonovgrad	Haskovo Province	4,261	8,294	7,648	6,941			
112		Simitli	Blagoevgrad Province	–	7,466	7,127	6,781			
113		Elin Pelin	Sofia Province	–	6,646	6,700	6,705			
114		Dolni Chiflik	Varna Province	–	7,126	6,863	6,698			
115		Tervel	Dobrich Province	–	7,859	7,178	6,682			
116		Dulovo	Silistra Province	–	7,618	7,001	6,568			
117		Varshets	Montana Province	–	7,635	7,199	6,428			
118		Kotel	Sliven Province	3,674	7,781	6,893	6,066			
119		Madan	Smolyan Province	–	8,545	6,573	6,026			
120		Straldzha	Yambol Province	–	6,613	6,176	5,977			
121		Saedinenie	Plovdiv Province	–	6,801	6,364	5,951			
122		Bobov Dol	Kyustendil Province	–	7,655	6,915	5,891			
123		Tsarevo	Burgas Province	1,960	6,005	5,854	5,882			
124		Kuklen	Plovdiv Province	–	5,647	5,907	5,837			
125		Tvarditsa	Sliven Province	–	7,196	5,983	5,651			
126		Yakoruda	Blagoevgrad Province	–	6,455	6,139	5,627			
127		Elena	Veliko Tarnovo Province	2,658	7,226	6,412	5,623			
128		Topolovgrad	Haskovo Province	6,668	7,386	6,618	5,542			
129		Bozhurishte	Sofia Province	–	–	4,822	5,439			
130		Chepelare	Smolyan Province	–	6,264	5,633	5,344			
131		Oryahovo	Vratsa Province	6,985	6,767	6,088	5,331			
132		Sozopol	Burgas Province	–	–	4,679	5,286			
133		Belogradchik	Vidin Province	2,192	6,635	5,838	5,242			
134		Perushtitsa	Plovdiv Province	–	5,586	5,385	5,149			
135		Zlatitsa	Sofia Province	–	5,636	5,757	5,090			
136		Strazhitsa	Veliko Tarnovo Province	–	5,554	5,279	5,085			
137		Krumovgrad	Kardzhali Province	1,514	5,286	5,239	4,861			
138		Kameno	Burgas Province	–	5,391	5,094	4,784			
139		Dalgopol	Varna Province	–	5,304	5,319	4,781			
140		Vetovo	Ruse Province	–	5,287	4,991	4,758			
141		Suvorovo	Varna Province	–	4,799	4,702	4,745			
142		Dolni Dabnik	Pleven Province	–	–	4,891	4,706			
143		Dolna Banya	Sofia Province	–	–	4,911	4,665			
144		Pravets	Sofia Province	–	–	4,430	4,621			
145		Nedelino	Smolyan Province	–	–	5,071	4,529			
146		Polski Trambesh	Veliko Tarnovo Province	–	5,471	5,160	4,470			
147		Trastenik	Pleven Province	–	–	4,784	4,460			
148		Bratsigovo	Pazardzhik Province	–	–	4,529	4,386			
149		Koynare	Pleven Province	–	–	5,115	4,383			
150		Godech	Sofia Province	–	–	4,801	4,355			
151		Slavyanovo	Pleven Province	–	–	4,763	4,342			
152		Dve Mogili	Ruse Province	–	–	4,790	4,314			
153		Kostandovo	Pazardzhik Province	–	–	4,535	4,277			
154		Debelets	Veliko Tarnovo Province	–	–	4,128	4,254			
155		Strelcha	Pazardzhik Province	–	–	4,678	4,240			
156		Sapareva Banya	Kyustendil Province	–	–	4,328	4,069			
157		Ignatievo	Varna Province	1,442	3,711	3,963	4,026			
158		Smyadovo	Shumen Province	–	–	4,331	3,986			
159		Breznik	Pernik Province	–	–	4,394	3,940			
160		Sveti Vlas	Burgas Province	–	–	2,311	3,886			
161		Nikopol	Pleven Province	–	–	4,758	3,832			
162		Shivachevo	Sliven Province	–	–	4,303	3,795			
163		Belovo	Pazardzhik Province	–	–	4,592	3,794			
164		Tsar Kaloyan	Razgrad Province	–	–	4,848	3,782			
165		Ivaylovgrad	Haskovo Province	–	–	4,442	3,704			
166		Valchedram	Montana Province	–	–	4,176	3,696			
167		Marten	Ruse Province	–	–	3,759	3,673			
168		Glodzhevo	Ruse Province	–	–	4,366	3,596			
169		Sarnitsa	Pazardzhik Province	–	–	3,803	3,579			
170		Letnitsa	Lovech Province	–	–	4,389	3,577			
171		Varbitsa	Shumen Province	–	–	4,204	3,560			
172		Iskar	Pleven Province	–	–	3,925	3,539			
173		Ardino	Kardzhali Province	–	3,663	3,733	3,530			
174		Shabla	Dobrich Province	–	–	3,945	3,505			
175		Rudozem	Smolyan Province	–	–	4,361	3,499			
176		Vetren	Pazardzhik Province	–	–	3,554	3,463			
177		Kresna	Blagoevgrad Province	–	–	3,882	3,428			
178		Banya	Plovdiv Province	–	–	3,882	3,427			
179		Batak	Pazardzhik Province	–	–	3,806	3,422			
180		Maglizh	Stara Zagora Province	–	–	3,610	3,398			
181		Valchi Dol	Varna Province	–	–	3,670	3,392			
182		Gulyantsi	Pleven Province	–	–	3,817	3,372			
183		Dragoman	Sofia Province	–	–	3,551	3,332			
184		Zavet	Razgrad Province	–	–	4,208	3,316			
185		Kran	Stara Zagora Province	1,214	3,682	3,636	3,295			
186		Miziya	Vratsa Province	–	–	3,810	3,289			
187		Primorsko	Burgas Province	–	–	3,461	3,282			
188		Sungurlare	Burgas Province	–	–	3,756	3,282			
189		Dolna Mitropoliya	Pleven Province	–	–	3,669	3,260			
190		Krivodol	Vratsa Province	–	–	3,683	3,250			
191		Kula	Vidin Province	–	–	3,802	3,220			
192		Kalofer	Plovdiv Province	–	–	3,475	3,191			
193		Slivo Pole	Ruse Province	–	–	3,867	3,179			
194		Kaspichan	Shumen Province	–	–	3,749	3,175			
195		Apriltsi	Lovech Province	–	–	3,122	3,121			
196		Belitsa	Blagoevgrad Province	–	–	3,582	3,091			
197		Roman	Vratsa Province	–	–	3,602	3,088			
198		Dzhebel	Kardzhali Province	–	2,294	2,871	2,982			
199		Dolna Oryahovitsa	Veliko Tarnovo Province	–	–	3,227	2,969			
200		Buhovo	Sofia City Province	–	–	3,227	2,952			
201		Gurkovo	Stara Zagora Province	–	–	3,159	2,917			
202		Pavel Banya	Stara Zagora Province	–	–	3,060	2,914			
203		Nikolaevo	Stara Zagora Province	–	–	3,167	2,864			
204		Yablanitsa	Lovech Province	–	–	3,080	2,855			
205		Kableshkovo	Burgas Province	–	–	2,905	2,820			
206		Opaka	Targovishte Province	–	–	3,224	2,817			
207		Rila	Kyustendil Province	–	–	2,959	2,807			
208		Ugarchin	Lovech Province	–	–	2,960	2,774			
209		Dunavtsi	Vidin Province	–	–	2,834	2,730			
210		Dobrinishte	Blagoevgrad Province	–	–	2,919	2,681			
211		Hadzhidimovo	Blagoevgrad Province	–	–	3,045	2,610			
212		Bregovo	Vidin Province	–	–	2,809	2,552			
213		Byala Cherkva	Veliko Tarnovo Province	–	–	2,952	2,547			
214		Zlataritsa	Veliko Tarnovo Province	–	–	2,845	2,544			
215		Kocherinovo	Kyustendil Province	–	–	2,210	2,542			
216		Dospat	Smolyan Province	–	–	2,693	2,540			
217		Tran	Pernik Province	–	–	2,838	2,492			
218		Sadovo	Plovdiv Province	–	–	2,613	2,491			
219		Laki	Plovdiv Province	–	–	2,432	2,406			
220		Koprivshtitsa	Sofia Province	–	–	2,567	2,377			
221		Malko Tarnovo	Burgas Province	–	–	2,801	2,377			
222		Loznitsa	Razgrad Province	–	–	3,004	2,361			
223		Obzor	Burgas Province	–	–	2,033	2,351			
224		Kilifarevo	Veliko Tarnovo Province	–	–	2,470	2,292			
225		Borovo	Ruse Province	–	–	2,613	2,275			
226		Batanovtsi	Pernik Province	–	–	2,447	2,247			
227		Chernomorets	Burgas Province	–	–	–	2,204			
228		Aheloy	Burgas Province	–	–	–	2,183			
229		Byala	Varna Province	–	–	2,081	2,130			
230		Pordim	Pleven Province	–	–	2,189	2,086			
231		Suhindol	Veliko Tarnovo Province	-	-	2,182	2,086			
232		Merichleri	Haskovo Province	-	-	2,043	1,915			
233		Glavinitsa	Silistra Province	–	–	2,133	1,891			
234		Chiprovtsi	Montana Province	–	–	2,267	1,862			
235		Kermen	Sliven Province	–	–	2,082	1,859			
236		Brezovo	Plovdiv Province	–	–	1,976	1,858			
237		Plachkovtsi	Gabrovo Province	–	–	2,043	1,854			
238		Zemen	Pernik Province	–	–	1,892	1,834			
239		Balgarovo	Burgas Province	–	–	2,094	1,819			
240		Alfatar	Silistra Province	–	–	1,761	1,668			
241		Boychinovtsi	Montana Province	–	–	1,804	1,615			
242		Gramada	Vidin Province	–	–	1,730	1,580			
243		Senovo	Ruse Province	–	–	1,616	1,550			
244		Momin Prohod	Sofia Province	–	–	1,790	1,543			
245		Kaolinovo	Shumen Province	–	–	3,073	1,492			
246		Shipka	Stara Zagora Province	–	–	1,348	1,466			
247		Antonovo	Targovishte Province	–	–	1,796	1,429			
248		Ahtopol	Burgas Province	–	–	1,328	1,310			
249		Boboshevo	Kyustendil Province	–	–	1,383	1,291			
250		Bolyarovo	Yambol Province	–	–	1,350	1,264			
251		Brusartsi	Montana Province	–	–	1,444	1,264			
252		Klisura	Plovdiv Province	–	–	1,404	1,241			
253		Dimovo	Vidin Province	–	–	1,343	1,188			
254		Kiten	Burgas Province	–	–	1,075	1,127			
255		Pliska	Shumen Province	–	–	1,034	1,045			
256		Madzharovo	Haskovo Province	–	–	696	613			
257		Melnik	Blagoevgrad Province	472	287	252	347			
		**Bulgaria**	Total:	**7,029,349**	**8,487,317**	**7,932,984**	**7,364,570**			

== See also ==
- List of villages in Bulgaria
- Nomenclature of Territorial Units for Statistics (NUTS) of Bulgaria
- List of cities in the European Union by population within city limits
- List of European cities by population within city limits
