= Krivnya, Ruse Province =

Krivnya, Bulgaria
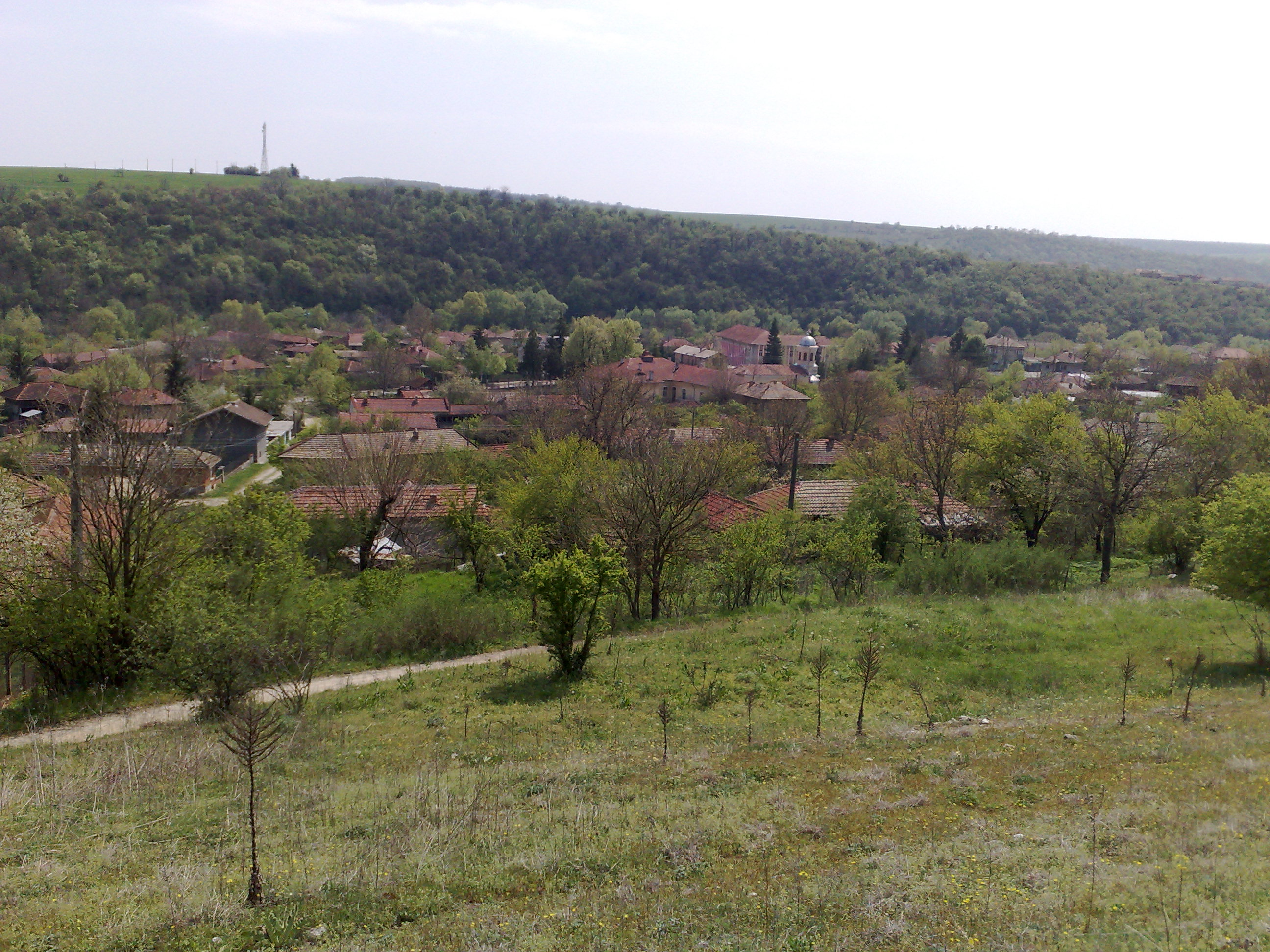

- Location of Krivnya
- Coordinates: 43°39′00″N 26°21′00″E
- Country: Bulgaria
- Province (Oblast): Ruse
- Elevation: 150 m (490 ft)

Population (2013)
  - Total: 536
- Time zone: UTC+2 (EET)
  - Summer (DST): UTC+3 (EEST)
- Postal Code: 7037
- Area code: 08185

Krivnya (Bulgarian: Кривня) is a village in northeastern Bulgaria, part of Vetovo Municipality, Ruse Province. Krivnya is picturesquely situated in the valley of the Beli Lom River in the western part of the Ludogorie located in the hilly Danubian Plain (Bulgaria). The village is surrounded by rock formations, among which the river meanders and divides the village into two parts. In the past the river flowed slowly making a big curve and forming a sort of peninsula. In the last century (1959) an artificial correction of the riverbed is made by using of explosions and the rock formation is "cut." Today this place is known as " Prosyakata." The altitude of the area ranges between 100 and 200 meters. Relief, except the rocky formations around the river is favorable for agriculture. The climate is continental with hot summers and cold winters. The village is located 3 km from the Ruse-Varna railway line and between the towns of Vetovo and Senovo, Ruse Province.

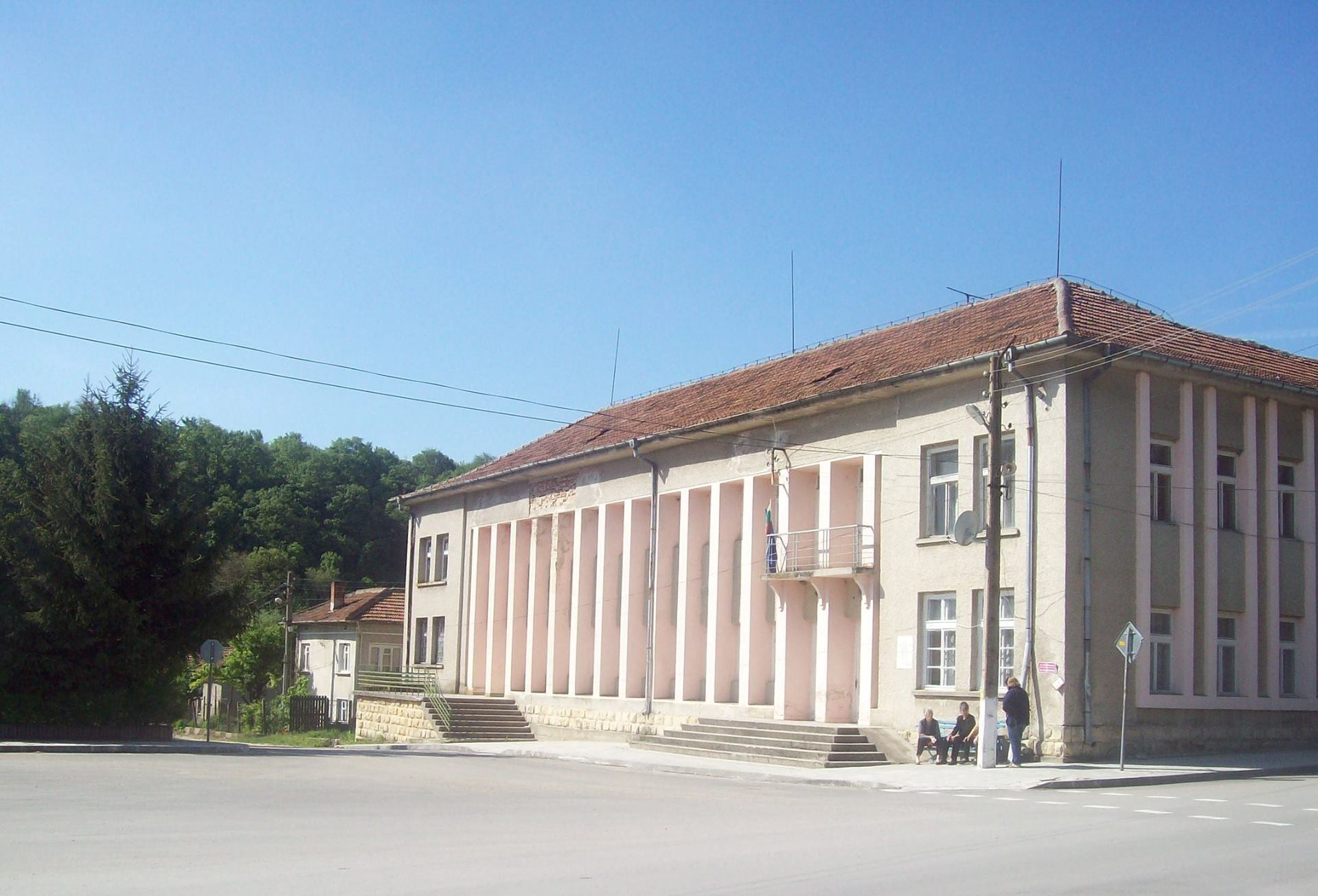
The library and community center in Krivnya

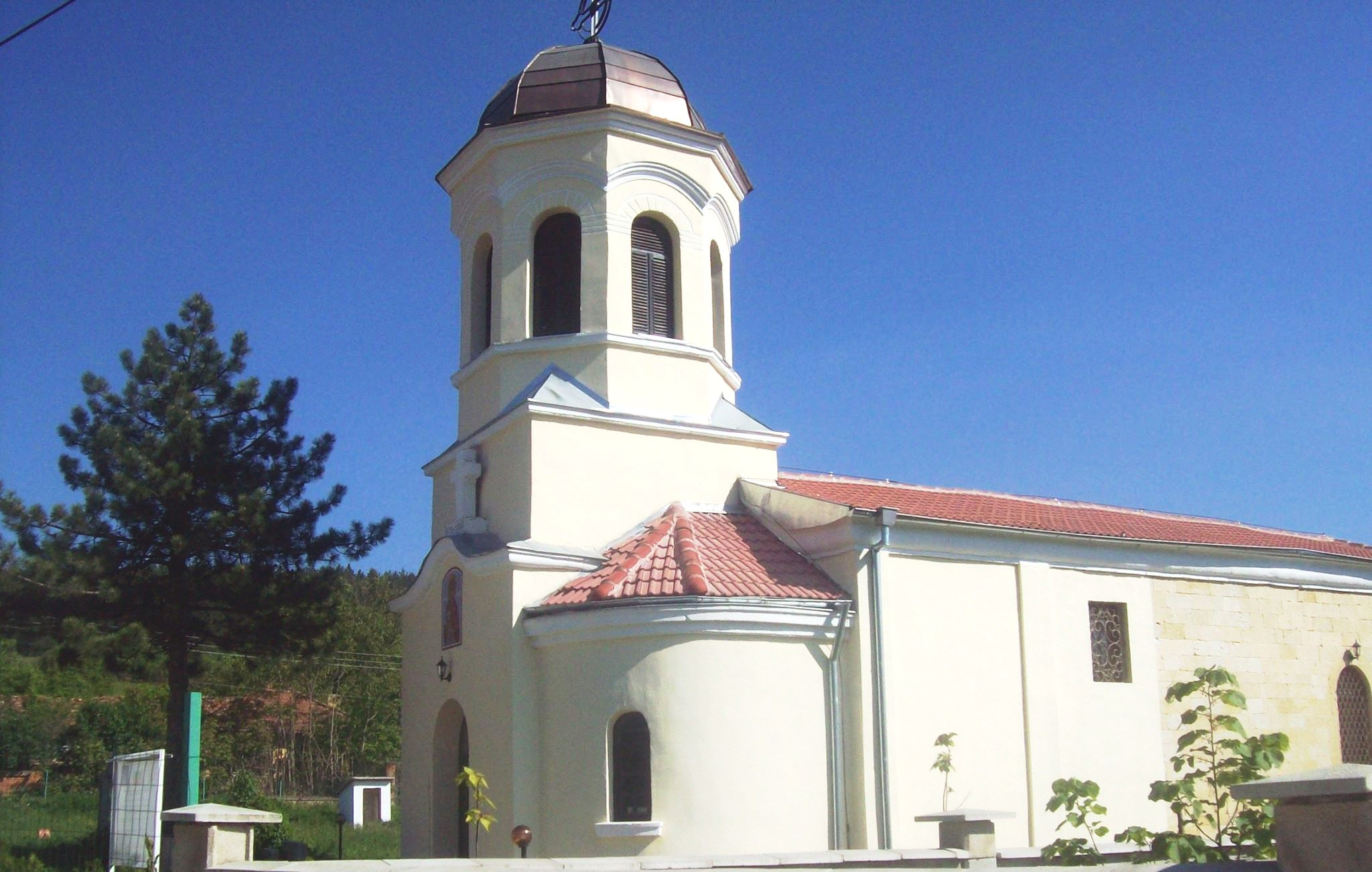
St. George church in Krivnya

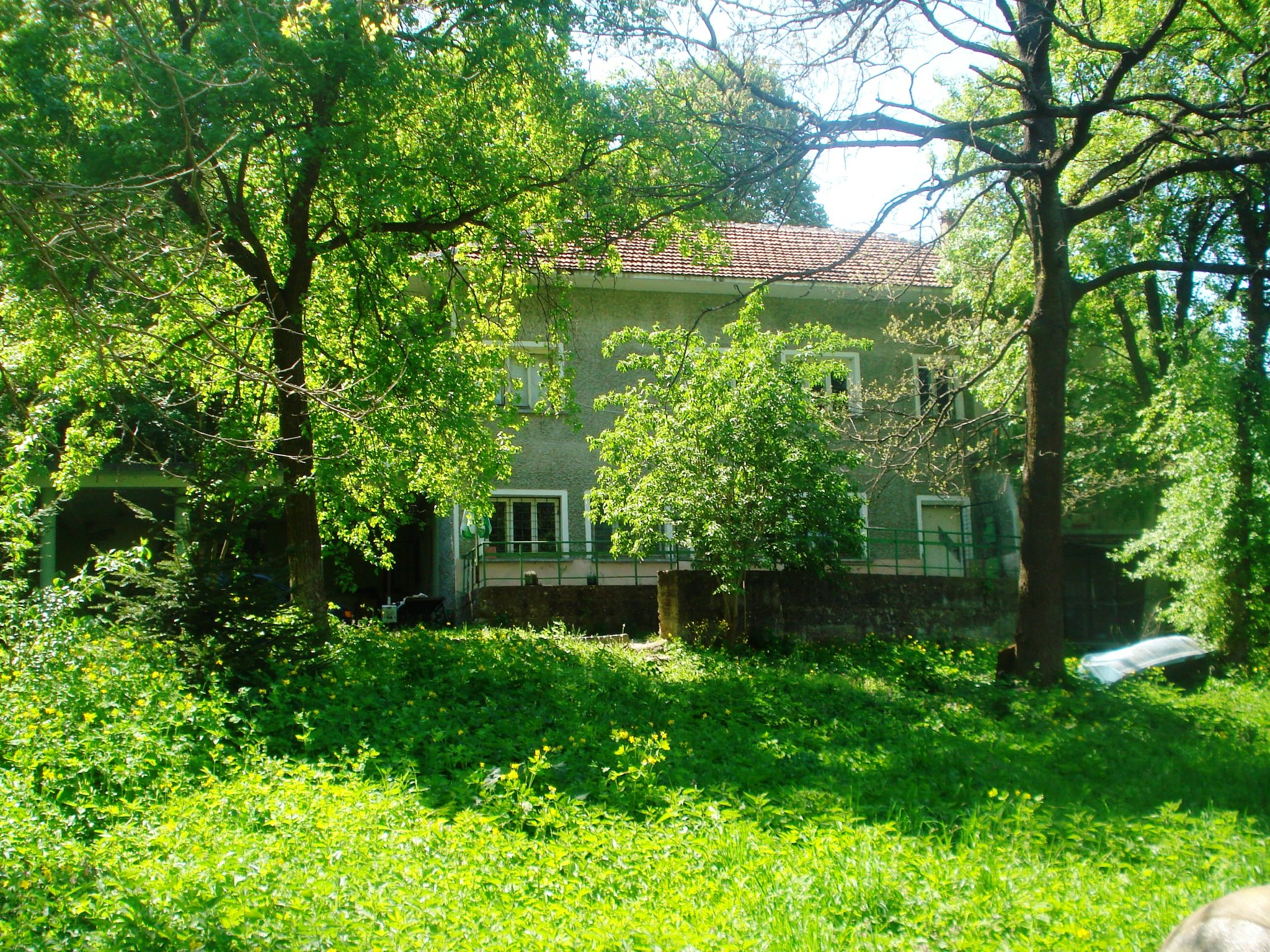
The hut in Kaynaka near Krivnya

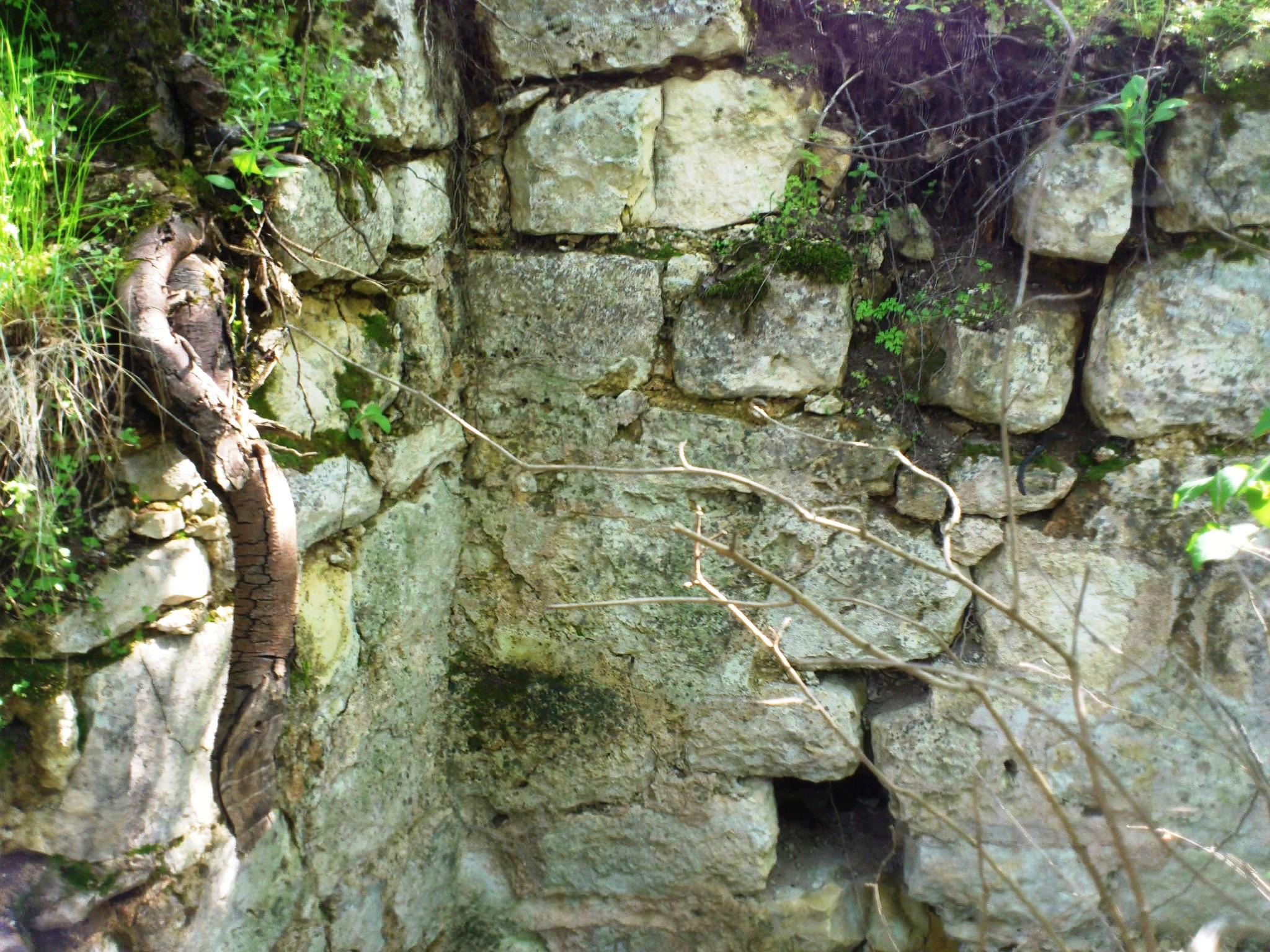
Remnants of the old settlement known as Kaleto near Krivnya

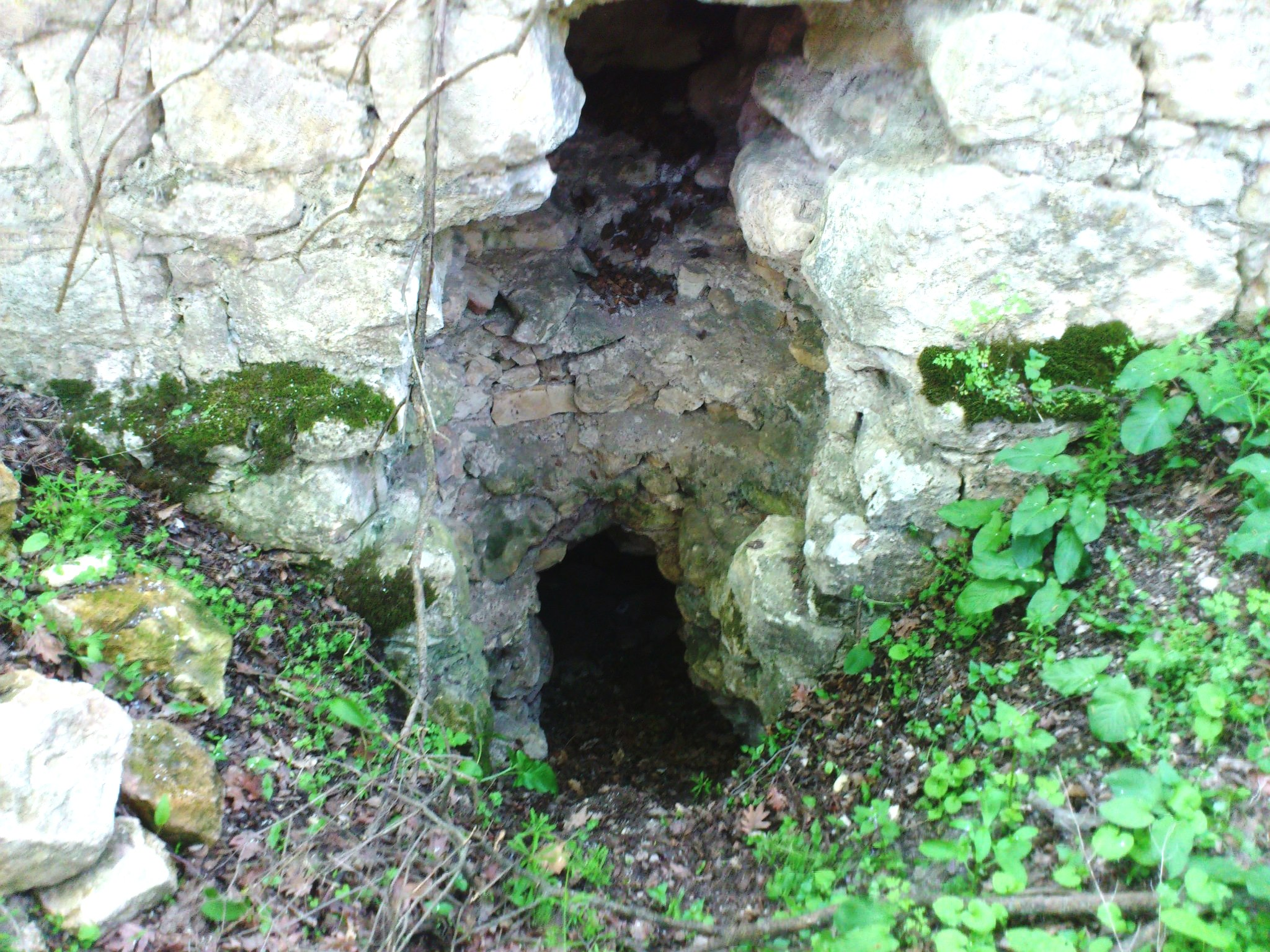
Remnants of the old settlement known as Kaleto near Krivnya

== History ==
Life in the village of Krivnya never stopped throughout the centuries. There are many remains of ancient settlements where many archaeological artifacts are found.

In the vicinity of the village is the fortress "Sin Grad". A part of the foundations of the city walls is preserved today. Some pottery from Roman and Byzantine times is found in this place. There are also traces of an ancient settlement with a shrine for the worship of Heros (Thracian horseman). Some rock churches and monasteries found in this area like for example "Chekartsa" and "Chesnova kanara" date from the time of Bulgarian medieval.

On the wall of one of the rock churches in the place known as "Shanlak kanara" in the town of Senovo there is an inscription: "Says pop Peya from Krivinu". One of the cells of the former cloister in "Chakarskata kanara" near the village of Krivnya has an inscription: "Written by pop Peya". According to different experts, the two inscriptions were written by one hand and are dated from the second half of the 14th century.

Krivina is the old name of Krivnya so called because of the curves, which Beli Lom River makes. In documents from the 16th and 17th centuries the village is known with the names Kirivina and Kirvine.

In 1876 Bulgarian revolutionary Tanyo Voivoda passed through these lands with his squad. Karel Škorpil (1859-1944) a Czech-Bulgarian archaeologist and researcher - one of the founders of Bulgarian archeology explored these places in the late 19th century. He made a detailed description of the ruins along the Beli Lom River including those located in the vicinity of the village of Krivnya.

== Places of interest ==
Sin Grad Fortress: Also known as "Kaleto" is located five kilometers northwest of the village Krivnya. The fortress is accessible through a dirt road and trail. The area has been studied by archaeologists. Remnants of the old settlement and ceramics from the Roman and Byzantine times are found here. In the lower part of the fortress foundations of early Christian churches can be seen. There are also remains of an ancient settlement from the 4th century.

Rock Monasteries: Located near the village Krivnya in the areas called " Chekartsa " (five cells church ) and " Chesnova kanara".

Cave "Kulina Dupka" ("Bozhkova Dupka", "Kumnitsa"): The cave is 1200 meters east of Krivnya in the middle of the rock formation between the village and the town of Senovo. Formed in limestone rocks, Kulina dupka cave known also as Bozhkova dupka and Kumnitsa is the longest cave in the Ludogorie and the fourth longest in Ruse Province. The total length is 326 meters. It is branched, horizontal and dry. It is divided into two parts. The first gallery has some fallen stones on the floor. After 36 meters the gallery narrows and a narrow opening leads to the second part of the cave. The second gallery has several chambers with a maximum height of 7–8 meters. All branch ends are impassable. In many places large amounts of bats' guano (up to 120 cm thick) can be seen.

Cave "Mustafa Chelebi Kanara": Located near the village Krivnya. The cave has a total length of 215 meters. Altitude: 190 m. Mapped in 1976, it consists of 15 niches and smaller caves.

Beli Lom Nature Reserve: The Beli Lom Nature Reserve is one of the most interesting protected areas in North Bulgaria. It covers part of the valley of river Beli Lom that flows into river Rousenski Lom, the last right-side tributary of the Danube River. The nature reserve covers 7730 acres along the Beli Lom River west of Krivnya. Includes woodlands called “Alibaliytsa”, “Kortelov grob”, “Ortaburun”, “Goryanska padina”, “Kiseltsite” and “Dabova gora” all dominated by oak and lime trees. Some of the animal species that live in the reserve are wildcat (Felis silvestris), forest sanlishvets (Driomys nitedula), ground squirrel (Spermophilus citellus), red deer (Cervus elaphus), rusty shelduck (Tadorna ferruginea), Egyptian vulture (Neophron percnopterus), Goshawk (Accipiter gentilis), owl (Bubo bubo), honey-buzzard (Pernis apivorus), short-legged lizard (Ablephaurus kitgaibelli).

Other Sites: Interesting places to visit are “Karadzhovitsa”, “Yurta”, “Kavanlak”, “Alibaliytsa” (Kainaka). In “Alibaliytsa” there is a small hut which is built next to a natural mineral water spring. The chalet is located at the beginning of a dense forest, which is part of Beli Lom Nature Reserve.

In the center of the village stands an old war memorial erected in memory of the villagers who died during the Balkan Wars and the First World War. Here are located all public buildings. Among them are the church, town hall and community center. One of the premises of the library has a museum collection (1989). One can see many vessels, tools and other household items, coins of Thracian, Roman, Byzantine and Bulgarian time, epitaphs, weapons, arrowheads, spears, maces, axes and many more items dating from ancient times to the early 20th century. Opposite to the village, located on a hill, is the TV transmission tower.

== Gallery ==
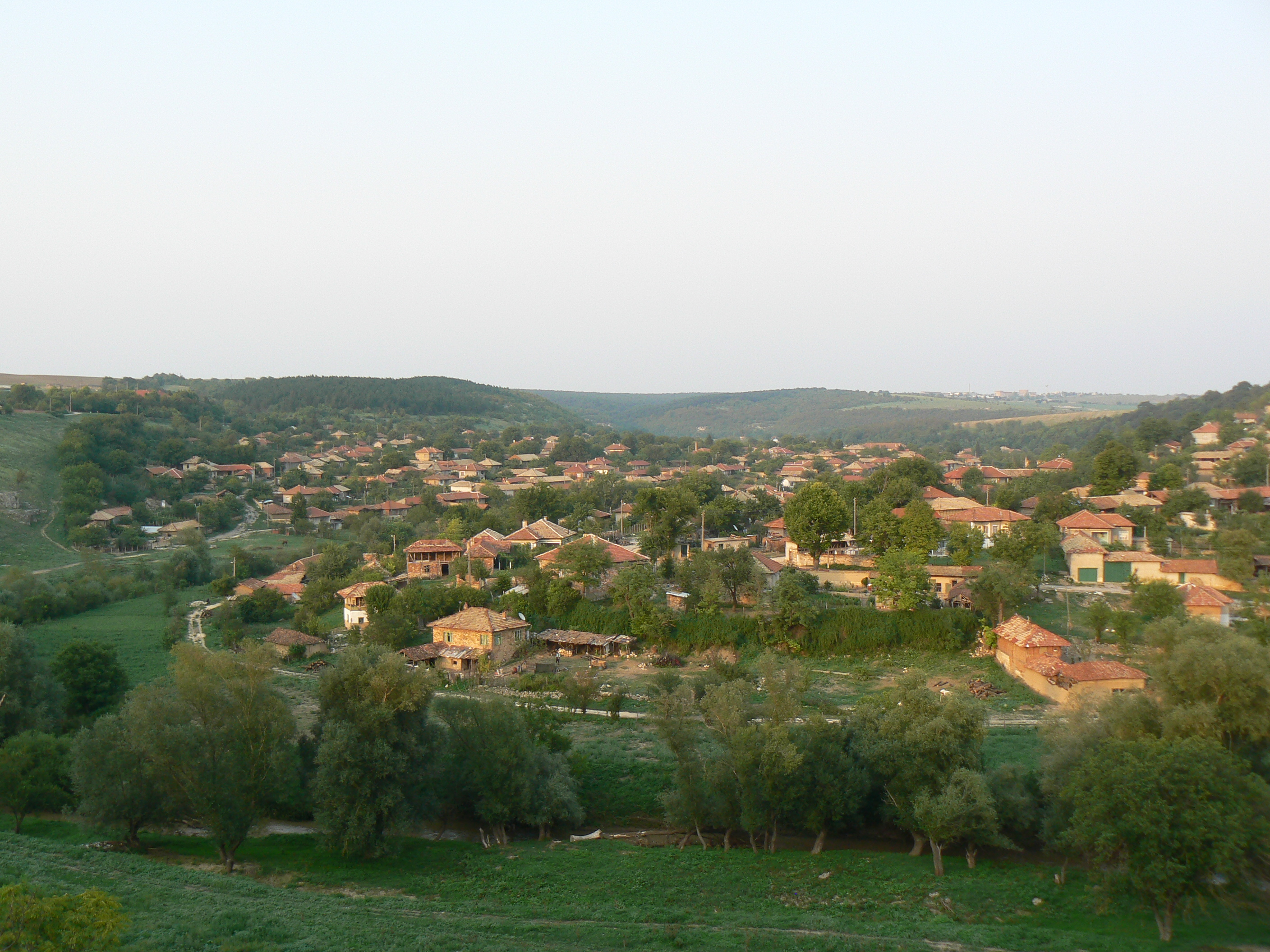
Panoramic view of the village

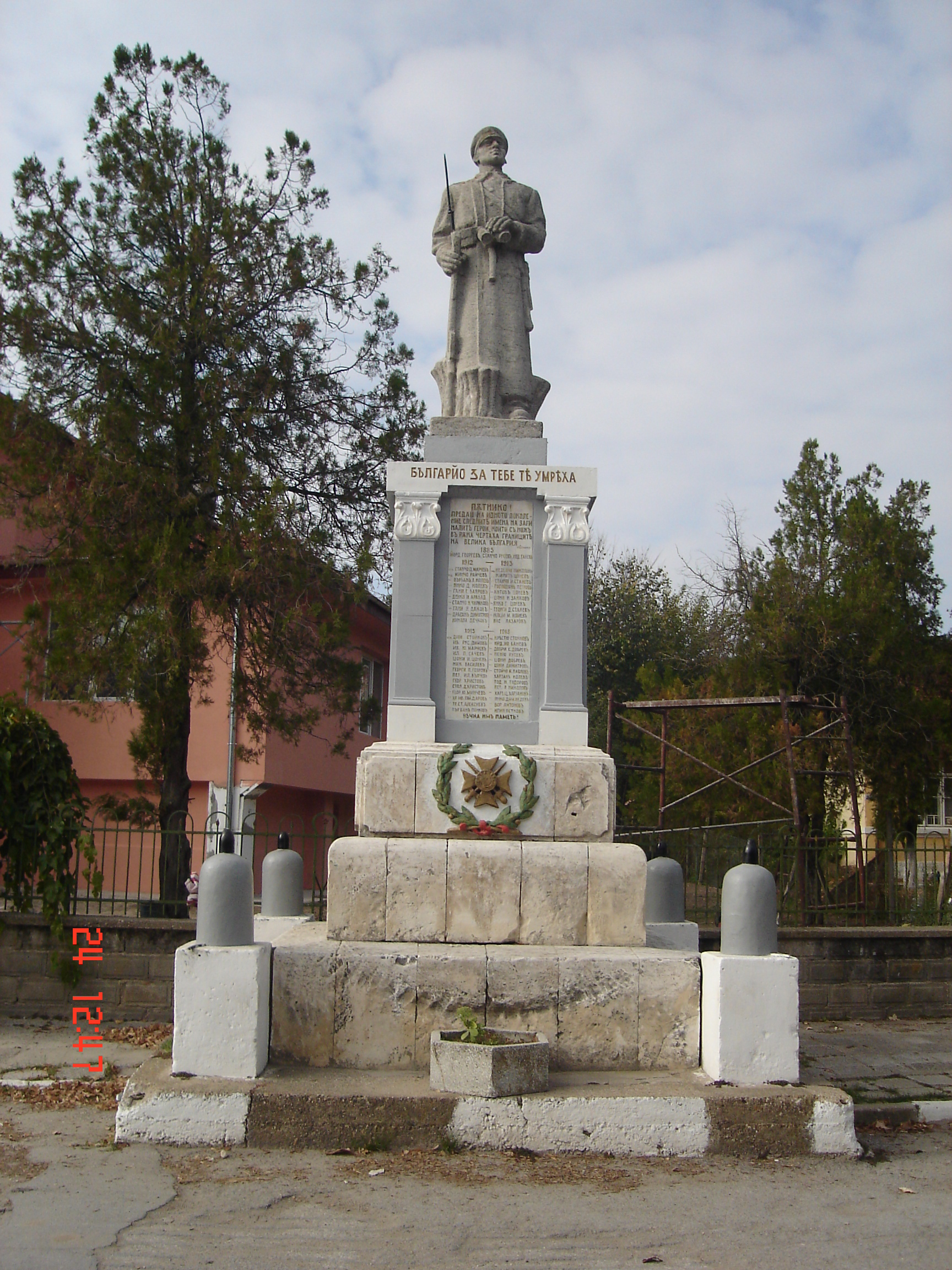
War memorial

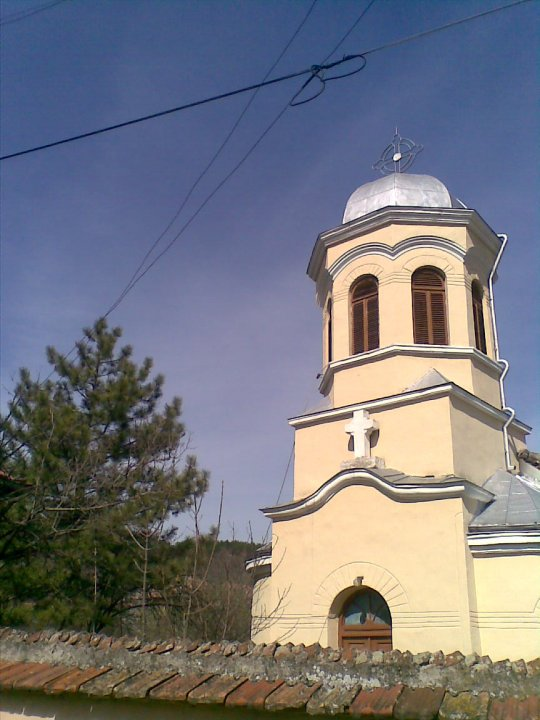
St. George Church

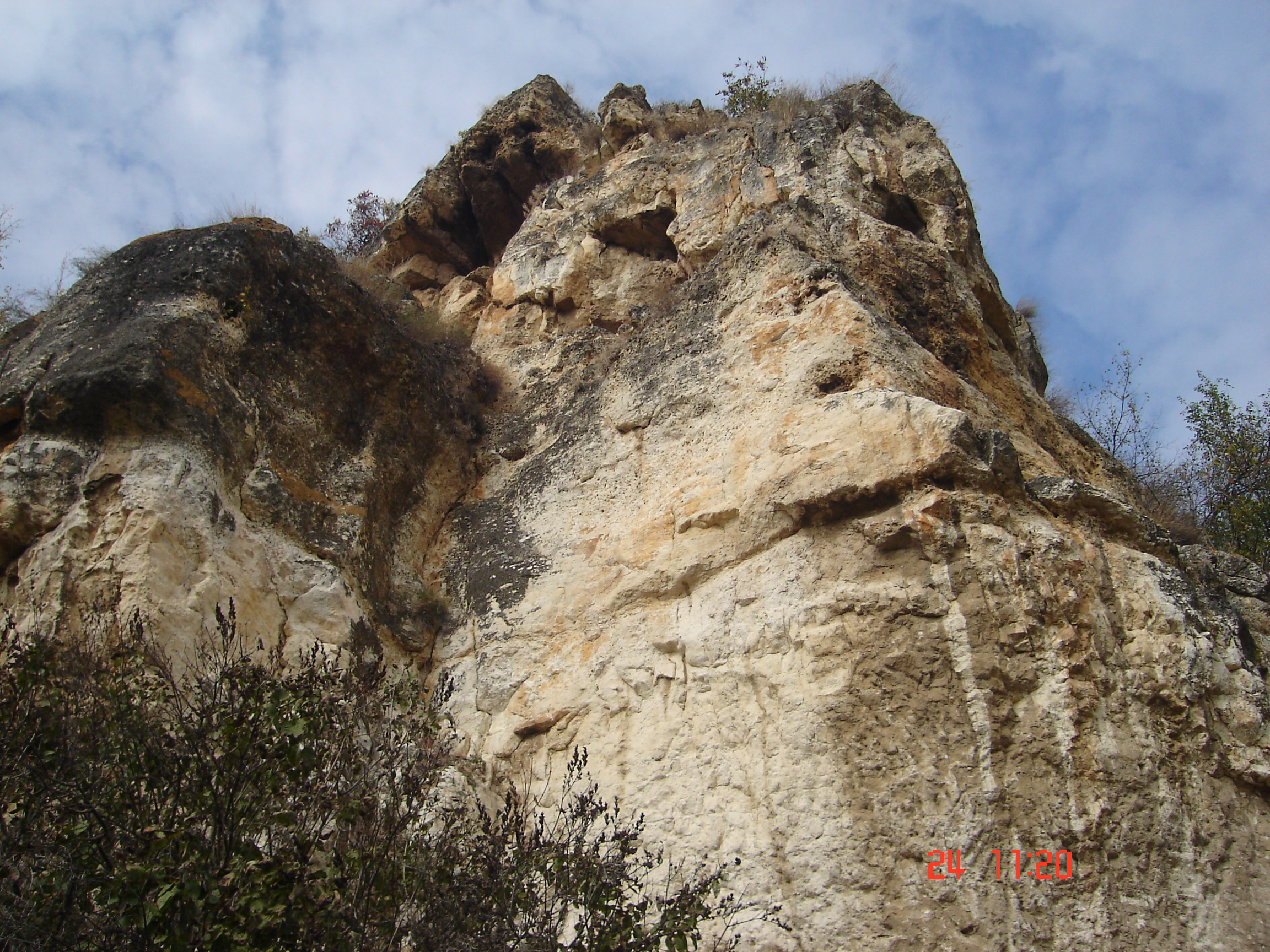
Rock formations near Krivnya

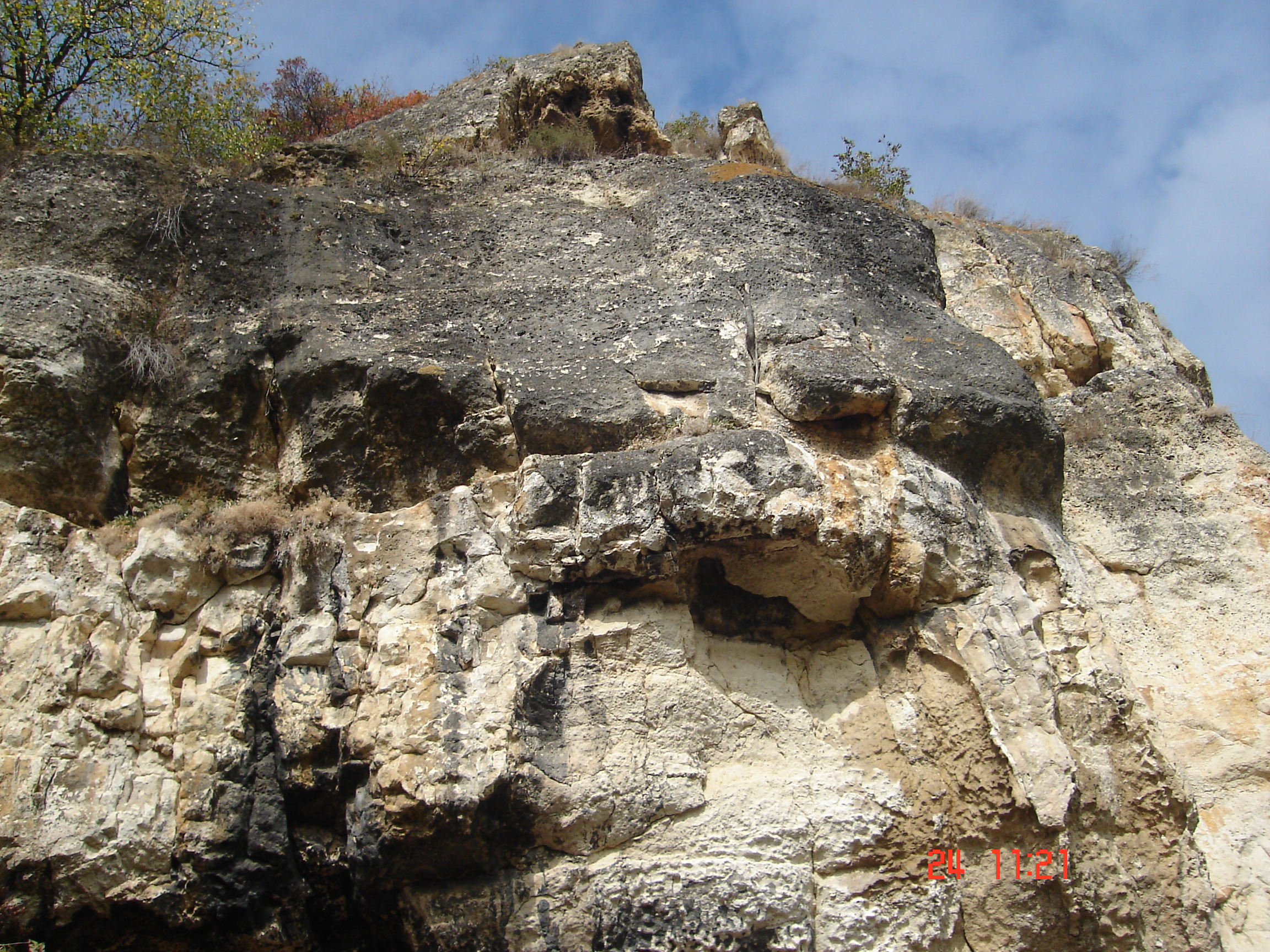
Rock formations near Krivnya

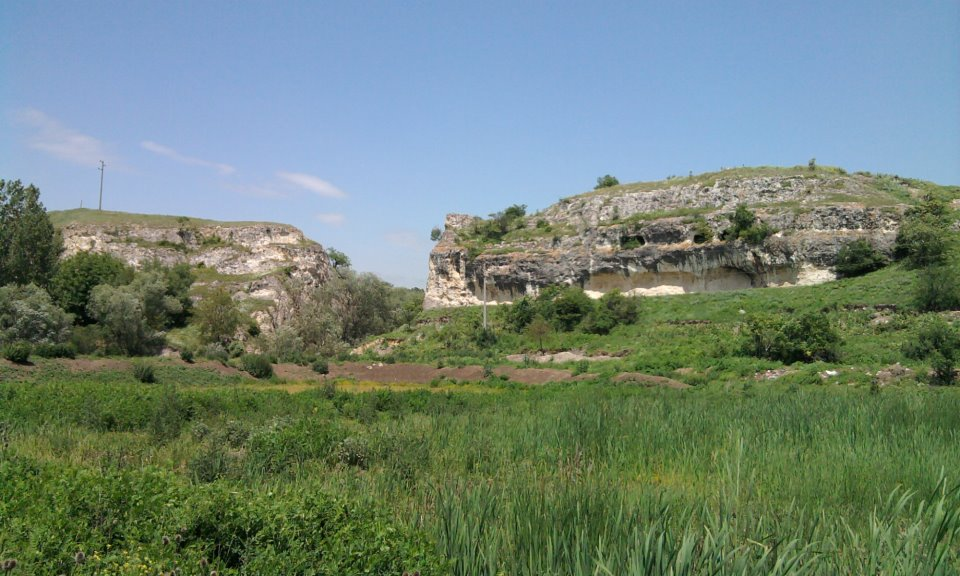
Prosyakata

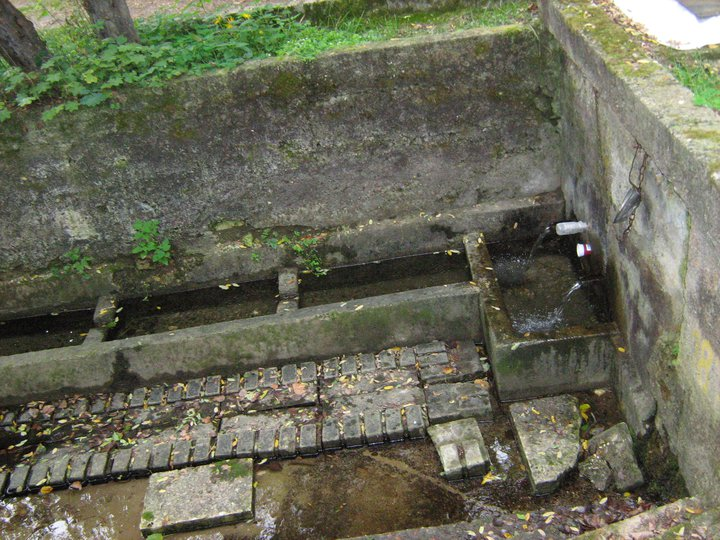
Kaynaka
