= Ruse Municipality =

Ruse Municipality Община Русе
- Municipality
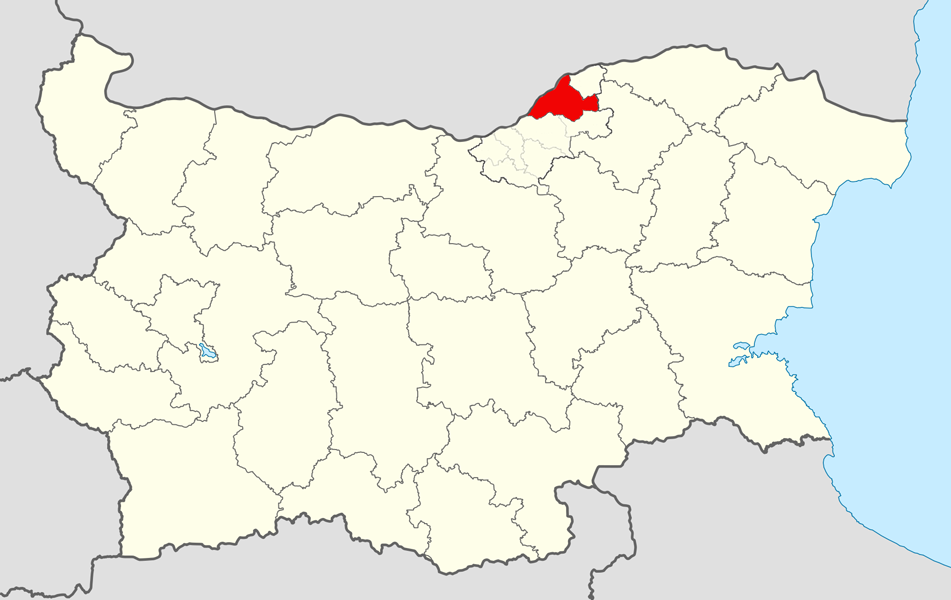
- Ruse Municipality within Bulgaria and Ruse Province.
- Coordinates: 43°49′N 26°1′E
- Country: Bulgaria
- Province (Oblast): Ruse
- Admin. centre (Obshtinski tsentar): Ruse

Area
  - Total: 469.17 km^{2} (181.15 sq mi)

Population (December 2009)
  - Total: 175,210
  - Density: 373.45/km^{2} (967.22/sq mi)
- Time zone: UTC+2 (EET)
  - Summer (DST): UTC+3 (EEST)

Ruse Municipality (Bulgarian: Община Русе) is a municipality (obshtina) in Ruse Province, Central-North Bulgaria, located along the right bank of Danube river in the Danubian Plain. It is named after its administrative centre - the city of Ruse which is also a capital of the province.

The municipality embraces a territory of 469.17 km^{2} (181.15 sq mi) with a population of 175,210 inhabitants, as of December 2009.

Apart from the cultural heritage of the main city, the area is best known with the Danube Bridge, the first bridge over the Danube in Bulgaria.

The main roads E85, E70 and II-21 crosses the municipality, connecting the province centre of Ruse with the cities of Veliko Tarnovo, Pleven, Razgrad and Silistra.

== Settlements ==
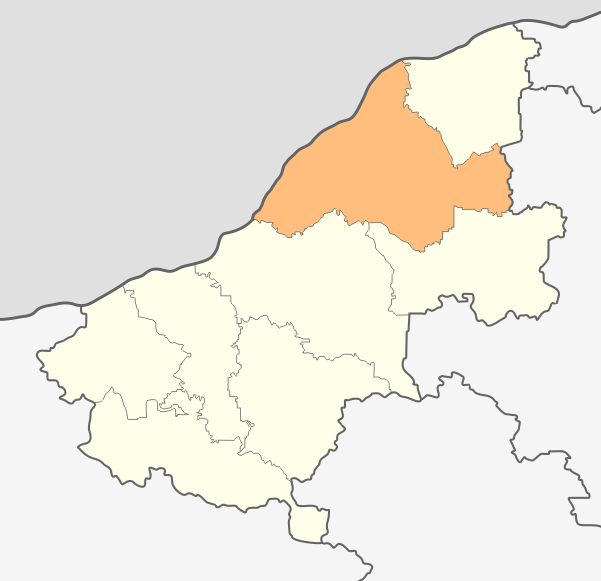
Ruse Municipality within Ruse Province

Ruse Municipality includes the following 14 places (towns are shown in bold):

Town/Village	Cyrillic	Population (December 2009)
**Ruse**	**Русе**	156,509
Basarabovo	Басарбово	1,349
Bazan	Бъзън	1,221
Chervena Voda	Червена вода	1,529
Dolno Ablanovo	Долно Абланово	214
Hotantsa	Хотанца	823
**Marten**	**Мартен**	3,691
Nikolovo	Николово	3,004
Novo Selo	Ново село	1,176
Prosena	Просена	634
Sandrovo	Сандрово	1,308
Semerdzhievo	Семерджиево	1,132
Tetovo	Тетово	2,303
Yastrebovo	Ястребово	317
Total		175,210

== Demography ==
The following table shows the change of the population during the last four decades. Since 1992 Ruse Municipality has comprised the former municipality of Novo Selo and the numbers in the table reflect this unification.

Ruse Municipality
**Year**	1975	1985	1992	**2001**	2005	2007	2009	**2011**
**Population**	170,561	195,237	191,375	178,435	175,935	174,627	175,210	...
Sources: Census 2001, Census 2011, „pop-stat.mashke.org“,

=== Religion ===
According to the latest Bulgarian census of 2011, the religious composition, among those who answered the optional question on religious identification, was the following:

Religious composition of Ruse Municipality
Orthodox Christianity	82.1%
Catholicism	0.6%
Protestantism	0.9%
Islam	5.7%
No religion	4.5%
Prefer not to answer, others and indefinable	6.2%

== See also ==
- Provinces of Bulgaria
- Municipalities of Bulgaria
- List of cities and towns in Bulgaria
