= Zdravko Petrov =

Bulgarian serial killer

- Born: Zdravko Ivanov Petrov; 1972 (age 53–54); Ruse, Ruse Province, People's Republic of Bulgaria (present-day Bulgaria)
- Convictions: Murder x5 Rape
- Penalty: Life sentence without the possibility of parole

Details
- Victims: 5+
- Span of crimes: 1998–1999
- Country: Bulgaria
- State: Ruse
- Date apprehended: May 24, 1999
- Imprisoned at: Belene Prison, Belene, Pleven Province

Zdravko Ivanov Petrov (Bulgarian: Здравко Иванов Петров; born 1972) is a Bulgarian serial killer who, together with accomplice Plamen Radkov (Bulgarian: Пламен Радков), was responsible for at least five murders committed in Ruse from 1998 to 1999. Both men were convicted for their respective roles in the killings, and each was sentenced to life without the possibility of parole.

== Murders ==
Petrov and his 27-year-old accomplice Plamen Radkov committed their first known murder on August 15, 1998, when they shot and killed 26-year-old customs officer Kaloyan Mihovski at a parking lot in front of his home. A month later, on September 17, they attempted to rob and kill renowned numismatist Krasimir Dunitsov, but were unsure which apartment was his. The pair questioned a local passer-by who erroneously pointed them towards the wrong apartment - as a result, Petrov and Radkov broke inside and killed 36-year-old retired policeman Yordan Yordanov by shooting him with AK-47s, also wounding his wife in the process.

On February 2, 1999, local police received a report that 60-year-old foreign exchange broker Georgi Georgiev was reported missing from Ruse. During a search for the missing man, police located his body in an elevator in Serdika, bearing multiple gunshot wounds.

The last confirmed murders occurred on May 24 - on that date, Petrov and Radkov went to the "Sevastopol" bar, where they shot 24-year-old bodyguard Angel Dimitrov five times, killing him. The pair then realized that 26-year-old waitress Veneta Nikolova had noticed the killing, after which they abducted her. They drove to a section of "9ti kilometar", raped her and then shot her four times.

== Arrest, trial, and verdict ==
Two days after the Dimitrov-Nikolova murders, Petrov was advised by his lawyer to surrender to the authorities, which he did. Radkov and two other alleged accomplices, Kamen Kolev and Petar Petrov (no relation to Zdravko), were also arrested. While examining the suspects' house for clues, officers located a Česká zbrojovka pistol, and after comparing its shell casings to those found at the crime scene, it was confirmed to be the murder weapon. In addition to that, multiple books on psychiatry, masks and a radio station tuned in to police frequency were located.

The trial began the following year, but in July 2000, it was briefly postponed following the murder–suicide of Kolev's parents in Marten. Reportedly, his father was so distraught that his son was accused of these crimes that he killed his mother and then hanged himself. The trial eventually resumed, and in October of that year, both Zdravko Petrov and Plamen Radkov were found guilty on all counts and sentenced to life imprisonment without parole, in addition to being fined 100,000 leva. Kamen Kolev and Petar Petrov were found not guilty and released.

A year after his conviction, Petrov was convicted on a separate rape conviction and given an additional 4 years imprisonment to be served at the Sofia Central Prison.

== Escape during prison transfer ==
On March 2, 2002, Petrov was scheduled to be transferred from the Sofia Central Prison to the Belene Prison. When the convoy reached Mezdra, Vratsa Province, they took off his handcuffs to hand him over to their colleagues from Gorna Oryahovitsa, but Petrov then fled into the nearby forest. Unable to apprehend him, the officers contacted their department, which in turn notified all other departments in northern Bulgaria to be on the lookout for the fugitive.

For the following two days, Petrov wandered the forest and was spotted near the village of Kreta, but managed to avoid arrest. He then boarded a train in Mezdra, but while relaxing in the train compartment, he was noticed by police officers Romil Penkov and Ilya Stoyanov. Believing that he greatly resembled the escaped convict, they told their two colleagues Ventseslav Metodiev and Biser Netsov to assist them.

Penkov and Stoyanov then approached Petrov and asked to check his documents, whereupon he attempted to flee, but was immediately apprehended. After attempting to come up with excuses, he eventually confessed to escaping from the prison convoy. A search revealed that he was only carrying a small Bible and a watch on him. The four officers then transported him back to Sofia.

For their efforts in arresting the fugitive, each of the four officers was gifted their own personal firearm and 1,000 leva from the Ministry of Interior's Trust and Safety Foundation.

== Appeals and lawsuits ==
Since their incarceration, both Petrov and Radkov have repeatedly appealed their sentences and sued the government for various reasons. The pair has always maintained their innocence, claiming that the killings were done by a now-deceased hitman and a mysterious Russian. Although there were allegations that Mihovski and Yordanov's killings were linked to a suspected racket at the customs office in Danube Bridge, they have never been confirmed.

During his incarceration, Petrov has allegedly been diagnosed with a personality disorder. One article published in 2011 claimed that he exhibited odd behaviors in prison, ranging from standing and pissing on his bed, refusing to leave his cell and talking to himself. In the meantime, Radkov - who is currently incarcerated at the Lovech Prison - sued the government on at least three occasions: once for being forced to wear handcuffs during a hearing; another for terrible conditions at the prison and a third for having his PlayStation 2 confiscated. The European Court of Human Rights ruled in his favour in the first two cases, ordering that he be paid 4,000 leva in restitution, but dismissed the final lawsuit.

In 2017, Petrov was among 15 prisoners who sued the government to cease CCTV surveillance inside their cells so they could peacefully have sex with their girlfriends and wives. The group - including fellow serial killers Stanislav Metodiev and Yordan Petrov (no relation), and Australian murderer Jock Palfreeman - successfully sued the government before the European Court of Human Rights, with the caviat that surveillance could be allowed only in certain circumstances.

=== Prison life ===
As of March 2026, Petrov and Radkov remain behind bars. Since their original trial, Petrov has reportedly shown remorse for his crimes and has embraced Evangelical Christianity, according to an interview with Pastor Ivodor Kovachev. Krasimir Dunitsov, the pair's original target in the Yordanov murder, also gave an interview in 2013, during which he discussed his belief that Kamen Kolev and Petar Petrov were not innocent and served as getaway drivers. In said interview, Dunitsov claimed that he knew who had hired them to kill him, as well as stating that Zdravko allegedly wanted to confess to additional murders he and Radkov had committed, but was not permitted to do so by someone higher up.

== See also ==
- List of serial killers by country
