= Slivo Pole =

Slivo Pole Сливо поле
- Location of Slivo Pole
- Coordinates: 43°57′N 26°12′E
- Country: Bulgaria
- Provinces (Oblast): Rousse

Government
  - Mayor: Valentin Atanasov
- Elevation: 23 m (75 ft)

Population (31.12.2009)
  - Total: 3,169
- Time zone: UTC+2 (EET)
  - Summer (DST): UTC+3 (EEST)
- Postal Code: 7060
- Area code: 08131

Slivo Pole (Bulgarian: Сливо поле, pronounced [ˈslivo poˈlɛ]) is a village in northeastern Bulgaria, part of Rousse Province. It is the administrative centre of the homonymous Slivo Pole Municipality, which lies in the northeastern part of the Province. The town is located five kilometres from the Danube, along the main road from Rousse to Silistra. As of December 2009, it had a population of 3,169.

Slivo Pole was proclaimed a village on 29 November 2002. Tatars had settled in the area following the Crimean War (1853–1856), as well as Bulgarians from Rousse and from Romania after 1863. The village was known as Islepol and Slepovo and was officially named Slivo Pole ("plum field") in 1912, as it was called so by the travellers who would stay in the local inn which had a big plum orchard.

== Municipality ==
Slivo Pole municipality covers an area of 276 square kilometres and includes the following 11 places:

- Babovo
- Borisovo
- Brashlen
- Chereshovo
- Golyamo Vranovo
- Kosharna
- Malko Vranovo
- Ryahovo
- Slivo Pole
- Stambolovo
- Yudelnik

The municipality has a relative Bulgarian majority at 44%, with Turks ranking second at 32% and the remainder being composed of Romani (18%) and Bulgarian Muslims (6%).

A notable sight in the area (partially in Slivo Pole municipality, mostly in Tutrakan municipality, Silistra Province) is the Kalimok-Brashlen protected area which includes several Danubian islands (Mishka, Malak Brashlen, Golyam Brashlen, Pyasachnik, Bezimenen, Kalimok, Radetski and Tutrakan) and is an internationally important bird area with many endangered species.

== Mayors of Slivo pole municipality ==
- Stancho H. Dimitrov (1912–1920)
- Georgi Yorgov (1920–1924)
- Mihail Ivanov (1924–1931)
- Iliya Todorov (1931–1932)
- Marin Nikolov (1932–1934)
- Angel Kolarov (1934–1935)
- Aleksandar Kolarov (1935–1937)
- Gencho Ostrev (1937–1944)
- Kyril Denev (1944–1946)
- Todor Kolev (1946)
- Manol Dochev (1946–1948)
- Nikolay Kolev (1948–1952)
- Georgi Kissimov (1952–1959)
- Stoyu Spasov (1959–1965)
- Drumi Atanasov (1965–1969)
- Todorka Pencheva (1969–1979)
- Stefan Pasev (1979–1991)
- Simeon Krastev (1991–1995)
- Georgi Golemanski (1995–1999)
- Ivan Ivanov (1999–2000)
- Georgi Golemanski (2000-2015)
- Valentin Atanasov (2015-
