= Vetovo (disambiguation) =

Vetovo can refer to one of the following:

- Vetovo, Bulgaria, a town in Ruse Province
- Vetovo Municipality, a municipality (obshtina) in Ruse Province, Central-North Bulgaria
- Vetovo, Croatia, a village in Požega-Slavonia County
