= Senovo =

Senovo may refer to:

- Senovo, Bulgaria, a town in the Vetovo Municipality in northeastern Bulgaria
- Senovo, Slovenia, a town in the Krško municipality in eastern Slovenia
