= Antonovo Municipality =

Antonovo Municipality Община Антоново
- Municipality
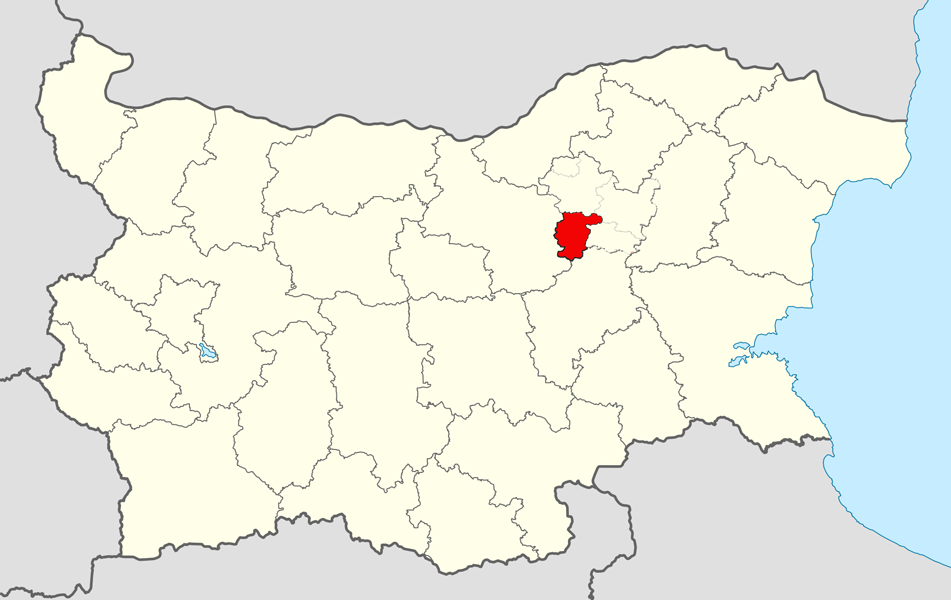
- Antonovo Municipality within Bulgaria and Targovishte Province.
- Coordinates: 43°6′N 26°9′E
- Country: Bulgaria
- Province (Oblast): Targovishte
- Admin. centre (Obshtinski tsentar): Antonovo

Area
  - Total: 472 km^{2} (182 sq mi)

Population (December 2009)
  - Total: 6,507
  - Density: 13.8/km^{2} (35.7/sq mi)
- Time zone: UTC+2 (EET)
  - Summer (DST): UTC+3 (EEST)

Antonovo Municipality (Bulgarian: Община Антоново) is a municipality (obshtina) in Targovishte Province, Northeastern Bulgaria, located in the transition between the Danubian Plain and the area of the so-called Fore-Balkan. It is named after its administrative centre - the town of Antonovo.

The municipality embraces a territory of 472 km^{2} (182 sq mi) with a population of 6,507 inhabitants, as of December 2009.

== Settlements ==
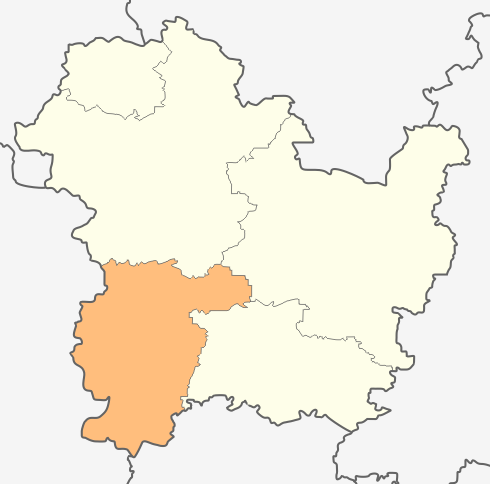
Antonovo Municipality within Targovishte Province

(towns are shown in bold): Population (December 2009)

- **Antonovo** - **Antonovo** - 1,453
- Bankovets - Банковец - 13
- Bogomolsko - Богомолско - 29
- Bukak - Букак - 17
- Chekantsi - Чеканци - 57
- Cherna Voda - Черна вода - 79
- Cherni Bryag - Черни бряг - 161
- Devino - Девино - 54
- Dlazhka Polyana - Длъжка поляна - 62
- Dobrotitsa - Добротица - 263
- Dolna Zlatitsa - Долна Златица - 18
- Dabravitsa - Дъбравица - 10
- Glashatay - Глашатай - 32
- Golyamo Dolyane - Голямо Доляне - 8
- Gorna Zlatitsa - Горна Златица - 38
- Halvadzhiysko - Халваджийско - 14
- Izvorovo - Изворово - 417
- Kapishte - Капище - 98
- Kitino - Китино - 95
- Konop - Коноп - 138
- Kraypole - Крайполе - 0
- Krusholak - Крушолак - 45
- Kapinets - Къпинец - 1
- Kyosevtsi - Кьосевци - 95
- Lyubichevo - Любичево - 282
- Malka Cherkovna - Малка Черковна - 6
- Malogradets - Малоградец - 101
- Manushevtsi - Манушевци - 4
- Mechovo - Мечово - 5
- Milino - Милино - 29
- Moravitsa - Моравица - 190
- Moravka - Моравка - 211
- Orach - Орач - 121
- Pirinets - Пиринец - 24
- Poroyno - Поройно - 29
- Prisoyna - Присойна - 8
- Pchelno - Пчелно - 12
- Ravno Selo - Равно село - 51
- Razdeltsi - Разделци - 254
- Svirchovo - Свирчово - 28
- Svoboditsa - Свободица - 30
- Semertsi - Семерци - 231
- Slanchovets - Слънчовец - 1
- Stara Rechka - Стара речка - 21
- Starchishte - Старчище - 102
- Stevrek - Стеврек - 415
- Stoynovo - Стойново - 38
- Stroynovtsi - Стройновци - 11
- Shishkovitsa - Шишковица - 39
- Taymishte - Таймище - 186
- Tihovets - Тиховец - 3
- Treskavets - Трескавец - 595
- Velikovtsi - Великовци - 80
- Velyovo - Вельово - 92
- Yazovets - Язовец - 10
- Yarebichno - Яребично - 6
- Yastrebino - Ястребино - 72

== Demography ==
The following table shows the change of the population during the last four decades.

Antonovo Municipality
Year	1975	1985	1992	2001	2005	2007	2009	2011
Population	12,107	9,849	8,697	7,593	7,179	6,836	6,507	6,262
Sources: Census 2001, Census 2011, „pop-stat.mashke.org“,

=== Ethnic composition ===
According to the 2011 census, among those who answered the optional question on ethnic identification, the ethnic composition of the municipality was the following:

Ethnic group	Population	Percentage
Bulgarians	1660	28%
Turks	2975	50.1%
Roma (Gypsy)	1212	20.4%
Other	7	0.1%
Undeclared	84	1.4%

==== Religion ====
According to the latest Bulgarian census of 2011, the religious composition, among those who answered the optional question on religious identification, was the following:

Religious composition of Antonovo Municipality
Orthodox Christianity	27.1%
Catholicism	0.1%
Protestantism	0.2%
Islam	56.1%
No religion	2.0%
Prefer not to answer, others and indefinable	14.5%

== See also ==
- Provinces of Bulgaria
- Municipalities of Bulgaria
- List of cities and towns in Bulgaria
