= Plovdiv Zoo =

- Interactive map of Plovdiv Zoo
- 42.1438689°N 24.7109449°E
- Location: Plovdiv, Bulgaria
- Land area: 40

Plovdiv Zoo (Bulgarian: Пловдивска зоологическа градина) is a zoo located in Bulgaria's second largest city, Plovdiv.

The zoo in has been closed to the public since July 24, 2008, as it does not meet the requirements for housing and keeping of wild animals. As of 2015 there is a project to reopen the zoo. The new zoo will be situated at the terrain of the previous one but its area will be expanded from 1 to 4 hectares.
