= Slivo Pole Municipality =

Slivo Pole Municipality Община Сливо поле
- Municipality
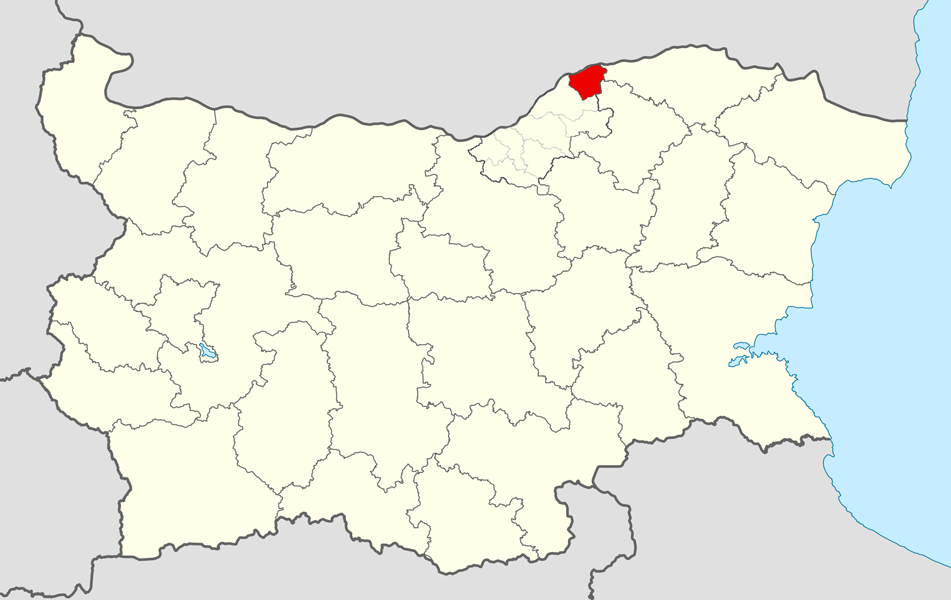
- Slivo Pole Municipality within Bulgaria and Ruse Province.
- Coordinates: 43°56′N 26°15′E
- Country: Bulgaria
- Province (Oblast): Ruse
- Admin. centre (Obshtinski tsentar): Slivo Pole

Area
  - Total: 276 km^{2} (107 sq mi)

Population (December 2009)
  - Total: 11,635
  - Density: 42.2/km^{2} (109/sq mi)
- Time zone: UTC+2 (EET)
  - Summer (DST): UTC+3 (EEST)

Slivo Pole Municipality (Bulgarian: Община Сливо поле) is a municipality (obshtina) in Ruse Province, Northeastern Bulgaria, located along the right bank of Danube river in the Danubian Plain. It is named after its administrative centre - the town of Slivo Pole.

The municipality embraces a territory of 276 km^{2} with a population of 11,635 inhabitants, as of December 2009.

The main road II-21 crosses the area from west to east, connecting the province centre of Ruse with the city of Silistra.

== Settlements ==
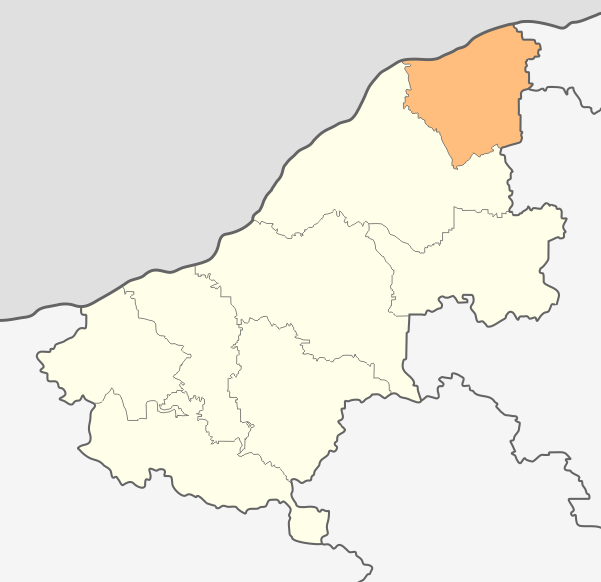
Slivo Pole Municipality within Ruse Province

Slivo Pole Municipality includes the following 11 places (towns are shown in bold):

Town/Village	Cyrillic	Population (December 2009)
**Slivo Pole**	**Сливо поле**	3,169
Babovo	Бабово	521
Borisovo	Борисово	787
Brashlen	Бръшлен	354
Chereshovo	Черешово	190
Golyamo Vranovo	Голямо Враново	1,688
Kosharna	Кошарна	626
Malko Vranovo	Малко Враново	984
Ryahovo	Ряхово	1,715
Stambolovo	Стамболово	697
Yudelnik	Юделник	904
Total		11,635

== Demography ==
The following table shows the change of the population during the last four decades.

Slivo Pole Municipality
**Year**	1975	1985	1992	**2001**	2005	2007	2009	**2011**
**Population**	19,873	18,121	14,658	12,912	12,381	12,087	11,635	...
Sources: Census 2001, Census 2011, „pop-stat.mashke.org“,

=== Religion ===
According to the latest Bulgarian census of 2011, the religious composition, among those who answered the optional question on religious identification, was the following:

Religious composition of Slivo Pole Municipality
Orthodox Christianity	42.3%
Catholicism	0.0%
Protestantism	0.3%
Islam	48.8%
No religion	3.7%
Prefer not to answer, others and indefinable	4.9%

== See also ==
- Provinces of Bulgaria
- Municipalities of Bulgaria
- List of cities and towns in Bulgaria
