= Borovo Municipality, Bulgaria =

Borovo Municipality Община Борово
- Municipality
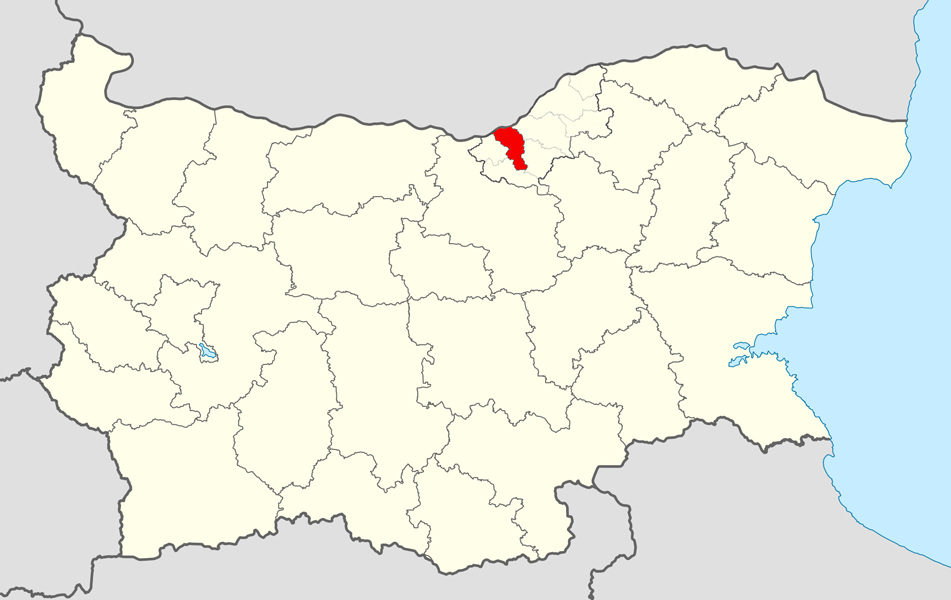
- Borovo Municipality within Bulgaria and Ruse Province.
- Coordinates: 43°35′N 25°46′E
- Country: Bulgaria
- Province (Oblast): Ruse
- Admin. centre (Obshtinski tsentar): Borovo

Area
  - Total: 245.3 km^{2} (94.7 sq mi)

Population (December 2009)
  - Total: 6,699
  - Density: 27.31/km^{2} (70.73/sq mi)
- Time zone: UTC+2 (EET)
  - Summer (DST): UTC+3 (EEST)

Borovo Municipality (Bulgarian: Община Борово) is a small municipality (obshtina) in Ruse Province, central-northern Bulgaria, located along the right bank of Danube river in the Danubian Plain. It is named after its administrative centre: the town of Borovo.

The municipality embraces a territory of 245.3 km^{2} (94.7 sq mi) with a population of 6,699 inhabitants as of December 2009.

The main road E85 crosses the area from south to north, connecting the province centre of Ruse with the cities of Veliko Tarnovo and Pleven and Sofia.

== Settlements ==
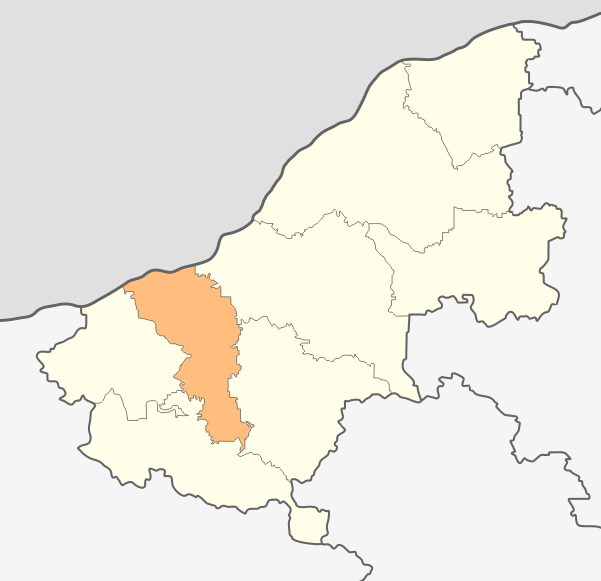
Borovo Municipality within Ruse Province

Borovo Municipality includes the following 7 places (towns are shown in bold):

Town/Village	Cyrillic	Population (December 2009)
**Borovo**	**Борово**	2,330
Batin	Батин	655
Brestovitsa	Брестовица	310
Ekzarh Yosif	Екзарх Йосиф	594
Gorno Ablanovo	Горно Абланово	1,160
Obretenik	Обретеник	1,495
Volovo	Волово	155
Total		6,699

== Demography ==
The following table shows the change of the population during the last four decades.

Borovo Municipality
**Year**	1975	1985	1992	**2001**	2005	2007	2009	**2011**
**Population**	11,827	9,774	8,889	7,905	7,223	6,985	6,699	...
Sources: Census 2001, Census 2011, „pop-stat.mashke.org“,

=== Religion ===
According to the latest Bulgarian census of 2011, the religious composition, among those who answered the optional question on religious identification, was the following:

Religious composition of Borovo Municipality
Orthodox Christianity	58.2%
Catholicism	0.4%
Protestantism	0.2%
Islam	29.4%
No religion	2.4%
Prefer not to answer, others and indefinable	9.4%

== See also ==
- Provinces of Bulgaria
- Municipalities of Bulgaria
- List of cities and towns in Bulgaria
