= Ruse blood wedding =

1910 massacre in Ruse, Bulgaria

A postcard depicting Dorostol-Cherven bishop Vasiliy with Ruse citizens, and the open coffins of sixteen of the massacre victims. The text reads: "The blood Sunday before Lent in Ruse, 28 February 1910".

The phrase Ruse blood wedding (Bulgarian: Русенска кървава сватба) usually refers to a 1910 conflict among ethnic groups and the army in Ruse, Bulgaria, resulting in the deaths of 24 people; 70 others were injured. The clashes were caused by the wedding of a Bulgarian man and an ethnic Turkish girl, of which the local Turks disapproved and state authorities violently opposed.

== Incident ==
On 24 February 1910, Yordan Stefanov (Archaic Bulgarian: Юрданъ Стефановъ) and Saafet obtained permission to marry from a doctor, as Saafet was "mentally healthy" and claimed to be 18 years old. Saafet decided to adopt a Slavic name — Ruska (Bulgarian: Руска). On the next day, her father, who was a hodzha (Turkish: hoca; a priest), expressed his protest before the mayor, along with other Muslims. According to him and his wife, their daughter was abducted and still was underage (almost 16 years old) for a marriage.

The court revoked the marriage permission on 27 February 1910, and ordered that the girl be returned to her parents, so she returned to their house until the evening. At night, a crowd of "adventurers" gathered in front of Saafet's house with the intention to "steal" her and set her free. The authorities responded by moving the girl to a police station, but could not cope with the approximately 1000 people, and Saafet eventually married Yordan on the 28th. Their wedding was celebrated by many on the central square, as this was the first Sunday before Lent (Bulgarian: Сирни заговезни), and a traditional fancy-dress carnival was held.

The local police officer, who also attended the carnival, was mocked for not being able to keep Saafet in the police station. Half an hour later, he called up support from the cavalry, and after some mutual verbal insults, the citizens and the military started a fight. There were 24 dead and about 70 injured after the clashes. At first, the police attempted to cover up the story by restricting communications to and from Ruse, but it soon became the top news in newspapers all over the country.

Various Bulgarian cities like Varna, Burgas, Ihtiman, a rally was held to protest the state's behavior. An attempt for a rally in Ruse was made but the police did not give permission. The issue continued until 1914, when 21 people were charged, 120 witnesses were heard but all suspects were acquitted.

== Political context ==
Reactions varied — some blamed the police, while others blamed the government for giving the orders, and claimed that the police only did what it should. The socialist party stated that that was just a "stupid love comedy" which should not have ended as it did.

The wedding posed a difficult problem to Tsar Ferdinand I of Bulgaria, who had already planned to have a meeting with Sultan Abdul Hamid II. The relations between Ferdinand and the Sublime Porte were tense after he became a self-declared tsar (former knyaz). The Turkish diplomats in Bulgaria insisted that not returning the girl to her parents would have been an insult to their religion, so that could have been the major factor which influenced the government's orders to guard Saafet "at any cost".

== Folklore ==
The event is popularly perceived as an example of both ethnic intolerance in a multi-cultural urban society, and the prevalence of emotion over descent.

Several versions of a folk song, inspired by the blood wedding, can be heard in the Ruse, Veliko Tarnovo, and Varna regions. A song from Turkish folklore in those regions is also known to be based on this story.

== See also ==
- Razgrad Incident

== Sources ==
- Nenov, Nikolay; Todor Mollov (2006). The Ruse "Blood Wedding" (in Bulgarian). ISBN 978-954-304-213-5.
