= Chereshovo, Ruse Province =

Chereshovo Черешово
- Village
- Location in Bulgaria
- Coordinates: 43.903°N 26.353°E
- Country: Bulgaria
- Province: Rousse
- Municipality: Slivo Pole
- Elevation: 125 m (410 ft)

Population (2015-03-15)
  - Total: 153
- Postal code: 7066

Chereshovo (Bulgarian: Черешово) is a village in northern Bulgaria. It is located in the municipality of Slivo Pole in Rousse.

As of March 2015, the village has a population of 153.
