= Vetovo =

Vetovo Ветово
- Location of Vetovo
- Coordinates: 43°42′N 26°16′E
- Country: Bulgaria
- Province (Oblast): Rousse

Government
  - Mayor: Mehmed Mehmed
- Elevation: 183 m (600 ft)

Population (December 2009)
  - Total: ▼4,777
- Time zone: UTC+2 (EET)
  - Summer (DST): UTC+3 (EEST)
- Postal Code: 7080
- Area code: 08161

Vetovo (Bulgarian: Ветово, pronounced [ˈvɛtovo], locally [ˈvjatovo]) is a town in northeastern Bulgaria, part of Ruse Province. It is the administrative centre of Vetovo Municipality, which lies in the eastern part of the area, and ranks third in population in the province after Ruse and Byala. The town is located 40 kilometres away from the provincial capital, Ruse. As of December 2009, Vetovo had a population of 4,777.

The population of Vetovo mainly consists of Bulgarians, Turks, Crimean Tatars and Romani (both Christian and Muslim). Besides Eastern Orthodox Christians and Muslims, Vetovo also has an Evangelical congregation.

== Municipality ==
Vetovo municipality has an area of 352 square kilometres and includes the following 7 places:

- Bazan
- Glodzhevo
- Krivnya
- Pisanets
- Senovo
- Smirnenski
- Vetovo

Besides Vetovo, the municipality includes two other towns: Senovo and Glodzhevo, with the other localities being villages.
