= Vetovo Municipality =

Vetovo Municipality Община Ветово
- Municipality
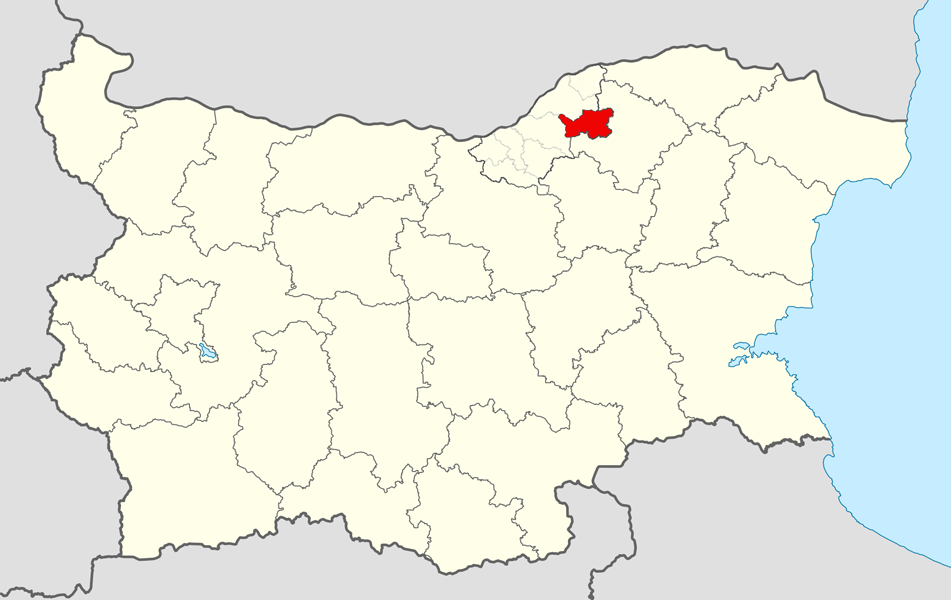
- Vetovo Municipality within Bulgaria and Ruse Province.
- Coordinates: 43°42′N 26°18′E
- Country: Bulgaria
- Province (Oblast): Ruse
- Admin. centre (Obshtinski tsentar): Vetovo

Area
  - Total: 352.52 km^{2} (136.11 sq mi)

Population (December 2009)
  - Total: 13,738
  - Density: 38.971/km^{2} (100.93/sq mi)
- Time zone: UTC+2 (EET)
  - Summer (DST): UTC+3 (EEST)

Vetovo Municipality (Bulgarian: Община Ветово) is a municipality (obshtina) in Ruse Province, Central-North Bulgaria, located in the western parts of Ludogorie geographical region, part of the Danubian Plain. It is named after its administrative centre - the town of Vetovo.

The municipality embraces a territory of 352.52 km^{2} (136.11 sq mi) with a population of 13,738 inhabitants, as of December 2009.

The main road E70 crosses the area in the western part of the municipality, connecting the province centre of Ruse with the city of Razgrad and the eastern operating part of Hemus motorway.

== Settlements ==
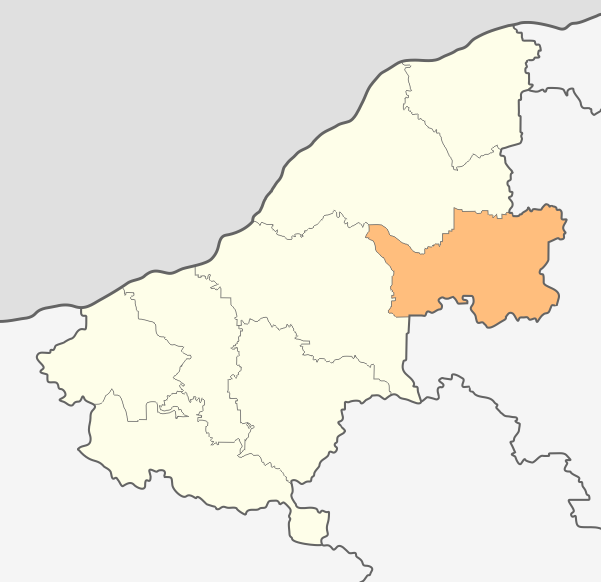
Vetovo Municipality within Ruse Province

Vetovo Municipality includes the following 6 places (towns are shown in bold):

Town/Village	Cyrillic	Population (December 2009)
**Vetovo**	**Ветово**	4,777
**Glodzhevo**	**Глоджево**	3,659
Krivnya	Кривня	630
Pisanets	Писанец	407
**Senovo**	**Сеново**	1,580
Smirnenski	Смирненски	2,685
Total		13,738

== Demography ==
The following table shows the change of the population during the last four decades. Since 1992 Vetovo Municipality has comprised the former municipality of Senovo and the numbers in the table reflect this unification.

Vetovo Municipality
**Year**	1975	1985	1992	**2001**	2005	2007	2009	**2011**
**Population**	12,089	11,583	18,230	18,774	15,707	15,367	13,738	...
Sources: Census 2001, Census 2011, „pop-stat.mashke.org“,

=== Religion ===
According to the latest Bulgarian census of 2011, the religious composition, among those who answered the optional question on religious identification, was the following:

Religious composition of Vetovo Municipality
Orthodox Christianity	35.2%
Catholicism	0.1%
Protestantism	0.0%
Islam	58.6%
No religion	1.1%
Prefer not to answer, others and indefinable	5.0%

== See also ==
- Provinces of Bulgaria
- Municipalities of Bulgaria
- List of cities and towns in Bulgaria
