= List of Catholic dioceses in Bulgaria =

The Roman Catholic Church in Bulgaria, joint in an episcopal conference (Mejduritualnata Episcopska Konferenzia vâv Bâlgaria), comprises only exempt sees:

- two Latin exempt bishoprics
- one Eastern Catholic pre-diocesan (exempt) jurisdiction

There is also an Apostolic Nunciature to Bulgaria as papal diplomatic representation (embassy-level) in the national capital Sofia (into which is also vested the Apostolic Nunciature to Macedonia).

== Current jurisdictions ==
=== Latin exempt jurisdictions ===
- Roman Catholic Diocese of Nikopol
- Roman Catholic Diocese of Sofia and Plovdiv

=== Eastern Catholic ===
sole remaining jurisdiction of a rite-specific particular church sui juris - Byzantine Rite, Bulgarian language

- Bulgarian Catholic Apostolic Exarchate of Sofia (covering all and only Bulgaria)

== Defunct jurisdictions ==
=== Titular sees ===
- seven Metropolitan Titular archbishoprics: Marcianopolis, Philippopolis in Thracia, Preslavus, Ratiaria, Serdica, Ternobus, Velebusdus
- four other Titular archbishoprics: Anchialus, Beroë, Mesembria, Odessus
- fourteen Episcopal Titular bishoprics: Abrittum, Appiaria, Bononia, Bucellus, Castra Martis, Deultum, Dorostorum, Germania in Dacia, Margum, Nicopolis ad Iaternum, Novæ, Œscus, Sozopolis in Hæmimonto, Transmarisca

=== Other defunct jurisdictions ===
All other defunct jurisdictions have current successor sees.

== See also ==
- List of Catholic dioceses (structured view)

== Sources and external links ==
- GCatholic - data for all sections
