= Ryahovo =

Ryahovo Ряхово
- Village
- Location in Bulgaria
- Coordinates: 43.989°N 26.244°E
- Country: Bulgaria
- Province: Ruse
- Municipality: Slivo Pole

Ryahovo (Bulgarian: Ряхово) is a village in northern Bulgaria, and as Ancient Ap(p)iaria a former bishopric, remaining a Latin Catholic titular see.

It is located in the municipality of Slivo Pole in Ruse Province.

As of February 2011, it had a population of 1,637 inhabitants.

== History ==
An ancient Roman fort known as Appiaria (Greek: Ἀππιάρια) was built on the site under Roman Emperor Vespasian forming part of the limes Moesiae defences on the banks of the Danube. Its garrison was at some time Ala I Atectorigiana.

It was probably destroyed by seventh century Bulgarian invaders.

In late 1916, it came under Romanian occupation, from the early morning of October 1st to the late night of October 3rd, during the Flămânda Offensive.

Apiaria Bight on Brabant Island in the Palmer Archipelago, Antarctica, was named after the village.

== Ecclesiastical History ==
Appiaria was important enough in the Roman province of Moesia Inferior (=Secunda) to become a suffragan diocese of the capital's Metropolitan Archdiocese of Marcianopolis, in the sway of the Patriarchate of Constantinople.

It has two documented incumbents :

- Lupicinus, mentioned in a letter of Saint John Chrysostomos to Pope Innocent I, circa 403
- Martialis, who signed the letter of the episcopate of Moesia Secunda to Byzantine Emperor Leo I the Thracian in 458 after the lynching by Coptic mobs of Patriarch Proterius of Alexandria.

The see isn't mentioned in the Notitia Episcopatuum by pseudo-Epifanius, edited under Emperor Heraclius I (circa 640), probably having ceased after the ruinous Bulgarian invasion.

=== Titular see ===
The diocese was nominally restored (in 1920?) as Titular bishopric of Apiaria (Latin until 1925) / Appiaria (Italian from the start, Latin since 1925) / Appiaren(sis) (Latin adjective).

It has had the following incumbents, so far of the fitting Episcopal (lowest) rank, including an Eastern Catholic:

- Bonifatius Sauer (신상원 보니파시오), Missionary Benedictine Congregation of Saint Ottilien (O.S.B.) (1920.08.25 – death 1950.02.07), first as Apostolic Vicar of Wonsan (North Korea) (1920.08.25 – 1940.01.12), later as Abbot Ordinary of Territorial Abbacy of Tŏkugen (North Korea) (1940.01.12 – 1950.02.07), also Apostolic Administrator of the renamed (above) Apostolic Vicariate of Kanko (Hamheung, North Korea) (1940.01.12 – 1950.02.07)
- Joseph Lennox Federal (1951.02.05 – 1960.03.31) as Auxiliary Bishop of Diocese of Salt Lake City (Utah, USA) (1951.02.05 – 1958.05.01); next promoted Coadjutor Bishop of Salt Lake City (1958.05.01 – 1960.03.31), succeeding as Bishop of Salt Lake City (1960.03.31 – retired 1980.04.22), died 2000
- Thomas Austin Murphy (1962.05.23 – death 1991.11.17) as Auxiliary Bishop of Baltimore (Maryland, USA) (1962.05.23 – retired 1984.05.29) and as emeritate
- Vasile Bizău (2007.10.27 – 2011.06.11) as Bishop of Curia of the Romanian Catholic Church (Byzantine Rite (2007.10.27 – 2011.06.11); later Eparch (Bishop) of Maramureş of the Romanians (Romania) (2011.06.11 – ).
- Ernesto Giobando, Jesuit Order (S.J.) (2014.03.05 – 2024.22.12), Auxiliary Bishop of Archdiocese of Buenos Aires (Argentina); later Bishop of Mar del Plata (Argentina) (2024.12.12 – )
- Anthony Gerald Percy (2025.05.02 – ), Auxiliary Bishop of Sydney, Australia.

== See also ==
- List of Catholic dioceses in Bulgaria

== Sources and external links ==
- GCatholic - (former and) titular see

Bibliography

- Pius Bonifacius Gams, Series episcoporum Ecclesiae Catholicae, Leipzig 1931, p. 428
- Michel Lequien, Oriens christianus in quatuor Patriarchatus digestus, Paris 1740, Vol. I, coll. 1225-1226
- Daniele Farlati e Jacopo Coleti, Illyricum Sacrum, vol. VIII, Venice 1819, pp. 110–111
