= Babovo =

Babovo Бабово
- Village
- Location in Bulgaria
- Coordinates: 43.981°N 26.302°E
- Country: Bulgaria
- Province: Rousse
- Municipality: Slivo Pole
- Elevation: 24 m (79 ft)

Population (2015-03-15)
  - Total: 422
- Postal code: 7068

Babovo (Bulgarian: Бабово) is a village in northern Bulgaria. It is located in the municipality of Slivo Pole in Rousse.

As of March 2015 the village has a population of 422.
