= Antonovo =

Antonovo Антоново
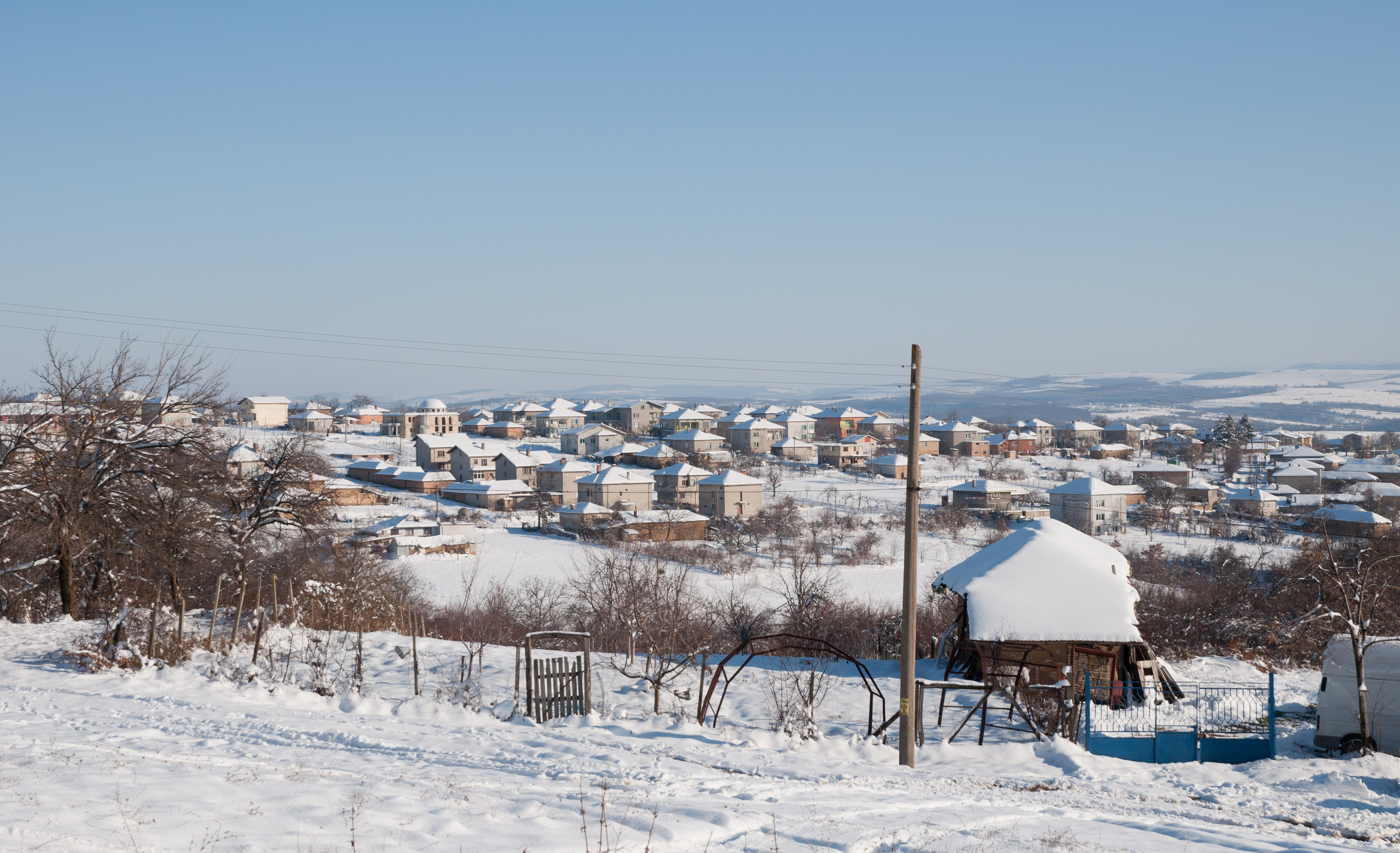
- View of Antonovo

- Location of Antonovo
- Coordinates: 43°09′N 26°10′E
- Country: Bulgaria
- Province (Oblast): Targovishte
- Municipality: Antonovo

Government
  - Mayor: Taner Ali
- Elevation: 433 m (1,421 ft)

Population (31.12.2009)
  - Total: 1,453
- Time zone: UTC+2 (EET)
  - Summer (DST): UTC+3 (EEST)
- Postal Code: 7970
- Area code: 06071

Antonovo (Bulgarian: Антоново [anˈtɔnovo]) is a town in the Targovishte Province of northeastern Bulgaria. It is the administrative center of the homonymous Antonovo Municipality. Antonovo sits in the Slannik low level mountain area close to the border of the Veliko Tarnovo Province. As of December 2009, the town had a population of 1,453.

== Economy ==
The local economy in Antonovo and the surrounding villages centres on agriculture although there is an unemployment rate of 52.12% in the region. This does sound very low but does not take into account that the main age group living in Antonovo is sixty five years and older.

The municipality for the region has created a development strategy for the economy that centres on infrastructure, agriculture and tourism to increase the areas potential and reduce the unemployment in the younger age range of residence.
