= Borovo (Kraljevo) =

Borovo Борово (Serbian)
- Village (Selo)
- Location within Serbia
- Coordinates: 43°29′N 20°43′E
- Country: Serbia
- District: Raška District
- Municipality: Kraljevo

Population (2002)
  - Total: 174
- Time zone: UTC+1 (CET)
  - Summer (DST): UTC+2 (CEST)

Borovo is a village in the municipality of Kraljevo, western-central Serbia. According to the 2002 census, the village has a population of 174 people.
