= Glodzhevo =

- Location of Glodzhevo
- Coordinates: 43°44′08″N 26°23′25″E
- Country: Bulgaria
- Province (Oblast): Rousse

Government
  - Mayor: Adem Hadzhimemish
- Elevation: 230 m (750 ft)

Population (2008)
  - Total: 4,366
- Time zone: UTC+2 (EET)
  - Summer (DST): UTC+3 (EEST)
- Postal Code: 7040
- Area code: 08184

Glodzhevo (Bulgarian: Глоджево, also transliterated Glojevo or Glodjevo, pronounced [ˈɡɫɔd͡ʒɛvo]) is a town in northeastern Bulgaria, part of Vetovo Municipality, Rousse Province.
