= Borovo, Ruse Province =

Borovo, Bulgaria Борово, България
- Town
- Location within Bulgaria
- Coordinates: 43°30′N 25°48′E
- Country: Bulgaria
- Provinces (Oblast): Rousse

Government
  - Mayor: Georgi Georgiev

Area
  - Total: 37.26 km^{2} (14.39 sq mi)
- Elevation: 278 m (912 ft)

Population (31.12.2014)
  - Total: 2,232
  - Density: 59.90/km^{2} (155.1/sq mi)
- Time zone: UTC+2 (EET)
  - Summer (DST): UTC+3 (EEST)
- Postal Code: 7174
- Area code: 08140
- Vehicle registration: P
- Website: borovo.org

Borovo (Bulgarian: Борово [ˈbɔrovo]) is a town in Ruse Province, Northern Bulgaria. It is the administrative centre of the homonymous Borovo Municipality. As of December 2009, the town had a population of 2,330.

The name Borovo comes from the Bulgarian word ‘Bor’ which means ‘pine’ (Bulgarian: Бор). The municipality has a temperate climate, with warm summers and cold winters.

Unique objects from a Thracian silver treasure (known as the Borovo Treasure) and a Thracian tomb of c. 4 BC have been discovered on the town's territory. There are evidences of the presence of an old Roman road discovered between the villages of Batin and Gorno Ablanovo near Borovo.

Khristo Markov, who became an Olympic champion in triple jump in 1988, was born in Borovo. Borovo is home to the football/soccer club Vihur (Bulgarian: Вихър) (Hurricane), which competes yearly in the Rousse region. The club is over 50 years old. The traditional work of the municipality has centered on the textile industry - there are several big factories manufacturing socks, tights and textile wear.

== Business in the area ==
In this part of Bulgaria are concentrated many clothing factories. These enterprises provide for a considerable number of jobs and form a large part of the local economy. The average salary of those working in the municipality is between 180 – 250 lev a month (or around $120 – $170 /mo.). The major exporters are the firms Elkon (to Belgium), Tri-Co (Finland and Denmark) one of the largest sock producers in Bulgaria, distributes domestically and for export (180 employees) which currently is working with partners from Israel, TIM Bulgaria that manufactures fine stockings and pantyhoses for Europe and Americas and Spiral Ltd. that produces fashion, sporting and textile wear. Other factories in the region are: Cherven 2000, a producer of machines for use in mills (60 employees), Elkon - extension cords and other electronic appliances (50 employees), Stefan Stefanov – KONTEKS - men's dress shirts for export and domestic use (23 employees), Plamen Penchev - men's dress shirts for export and domestic use (20 employees)
