= Marten, Bulgaria =

- Location of Marten, Bulgaria
- Coordinates: 43°55′N 26°5′E
- Country: Bulgaria
- Provinces (Oblast): Ruse

Government
- Elevation: 42 m (138 ft)

Population (15.09.2006)
  - Total: 3,902
- Time zone: UTC+2 (EET)
  - Summer (DST): UTC+3 (EEST)
- Postal Code: 7058
- Area code: 08117

Marten (Bulgarian: Мартен [ˈmartɛn]) is a town in the northern part of Bulgaria. It is located in Ruse Province.

== Geography ==
The town is located on the right bank of the Danube. In the site called Yamata (Bulgarian: Ямата) a meteorite crater, unique for Bulgaria, is located.

== History ==
The town was founded as a Roman Fortress called Tegra (Tegris, Tigris) in the 1st century AD, a part of the fortifications on the Danube border of the Empire. It is supposed to have existed also during the Second Bulgarian Empire. In early Ottoman documents it is named Maruteni.

Marten was proclaimed a town on August 7, 2006, by the House of Ministers of the Republic of Bulgaria.

Marten Crag on Trinity Peninsula in Antarctica is named after the town.

== Historic Sites ==
St. George church, built in 1896.

== Annual Events ==
Marten Fair is organized annually on May 6.
