= Senovo, Bulgaria =

- Location of Senovo
- Coordinates: 43°39′58″N 26°21′46″E
- Country: Bulgaria
- Province (Oblast): Rousse

Government
  - Mayor: Atanas Atanasov
- Elevation: 185 m (607 ft)

Population (2008)
  - Total: 1,616
- Time zone: UTC+2 (EET)
  - Summer (DST): UTC+3 (EEST)
- Postal Code: 7038
- Area code: 08315

Senovo (Bulgarian: Сеново [ˈsɛnovo], locally [ˈsɛɳovo]) is a town in northeastern Bulgaria, part of Vetovo Municipality, Ruse Province, near the town Tsar Kaloyan. It is situated on the banks of the river Beli Lom in the Danubian Plain.
