= Ruse Province =

Province in northern Bulgaria

Ruse Province Област Русе
- Province
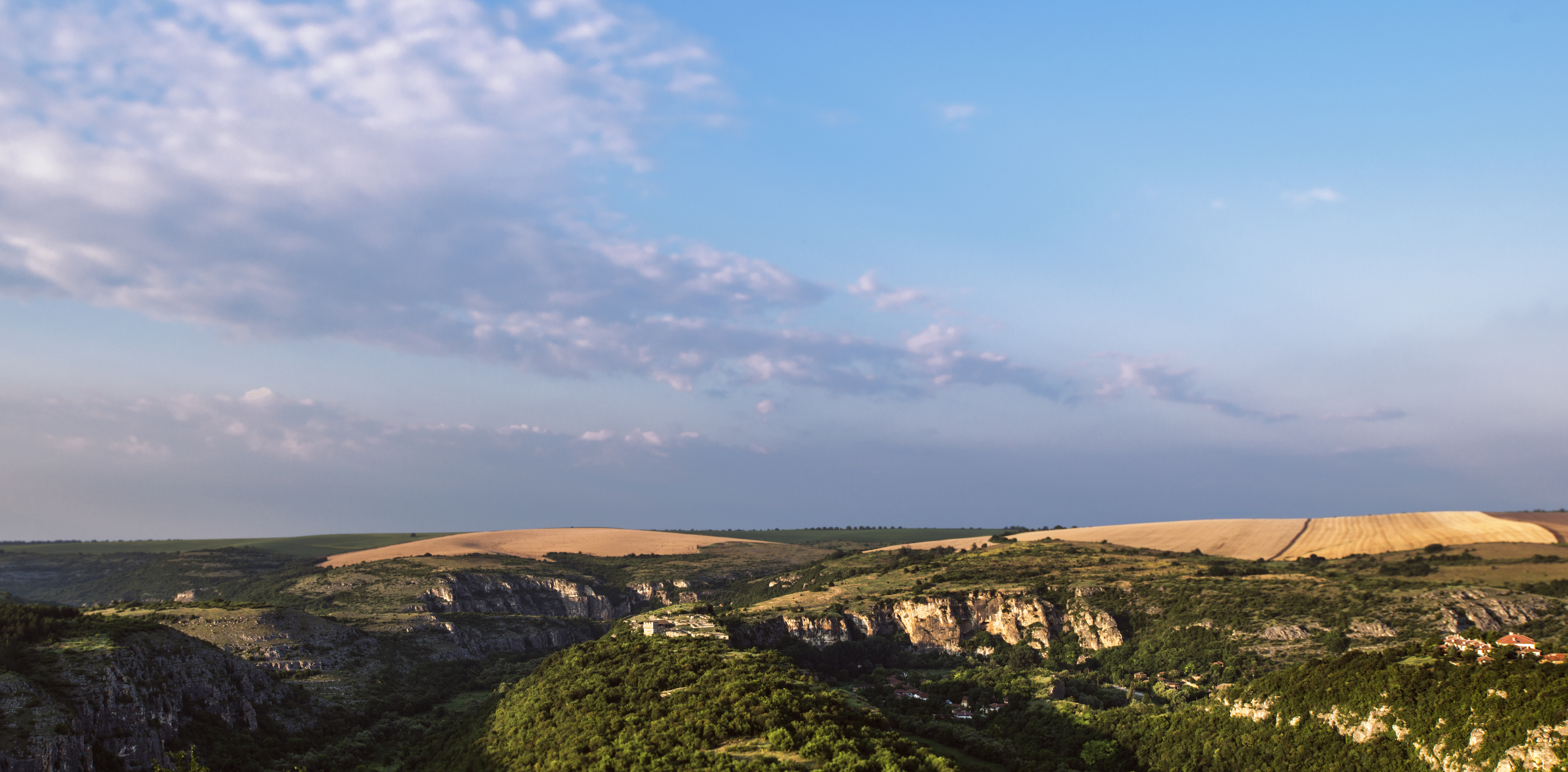
- View of Cherven Fortress

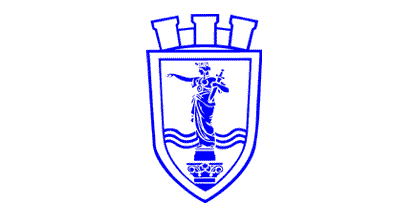
- Flag

- Location of Ruse Province in Bulgaria
- Country: Bulgaria
- Capital: Ruse
- Municipalities: 8

Government
  - Governor: Stefko Burdzhiev

Area
  - Total: 2,803.4 km^{2} (1,082.4 sq mi)

Population (December 2022)
  - Total: 189,623
  - Density: 67.640/km^{2} (175.19/sq mi)
- Time zone: UTC+2 (EET)
  - Summer (DST): UTC+3 (EEST)
- License plate: P
- Website: obshtinaruse.bg

Ruse Province (Bulgarian: Област Русе, romanized: Oblast Ruse), or Rusenska Oblast (Bulgarian: Русенска област, former name Ruse okrug) is a province in northern Bulgaria, named after its main city, Ruse, neighbouring Romania via the Danube. It is divided into eight municipalities with a total population, as of February 2011, of 235,252 inhabitants.

The Danube Bridge, one of only two bridges opened over the Danube, is located in the province. One of the versions of a folk song, inspired by the Ruse blood wedding, can be heard in the province.

== Municipalities ==
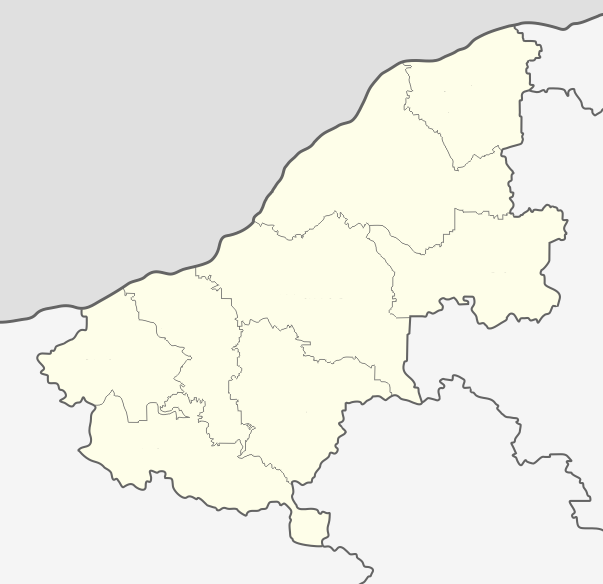

The Ruse province (област, oblast) contains eight municipalities (община, obshtina; plural общини, obshtini). The following table shows the names of each municipality in English and Cyrillic, the main town (in bold) or village, and the population of each as of December 2009.

Municipality	Cyrillic	Pop.	Town/Village	Pop.
Borovo	Борово	6,699	**Borovo**	2,330
Byala	Бяла	14,962	**Byala**	9,015
Vetovo	Ветово	13,738	**Vetovo**	4,777
Dve Mogili	Две могили	10,341	**Dve Mogili**	4,342
Ivanovo	Иваново	10,339	Ivanovo	880
Ruse	Русе	175,210	**Ruse**	156,509
Slivo Pole	Сливо поле	11,635	**Slivo Pole**	3,169
Tsenovo	Ценово	6,220	Tsenovo	1,673

== Demographics ==
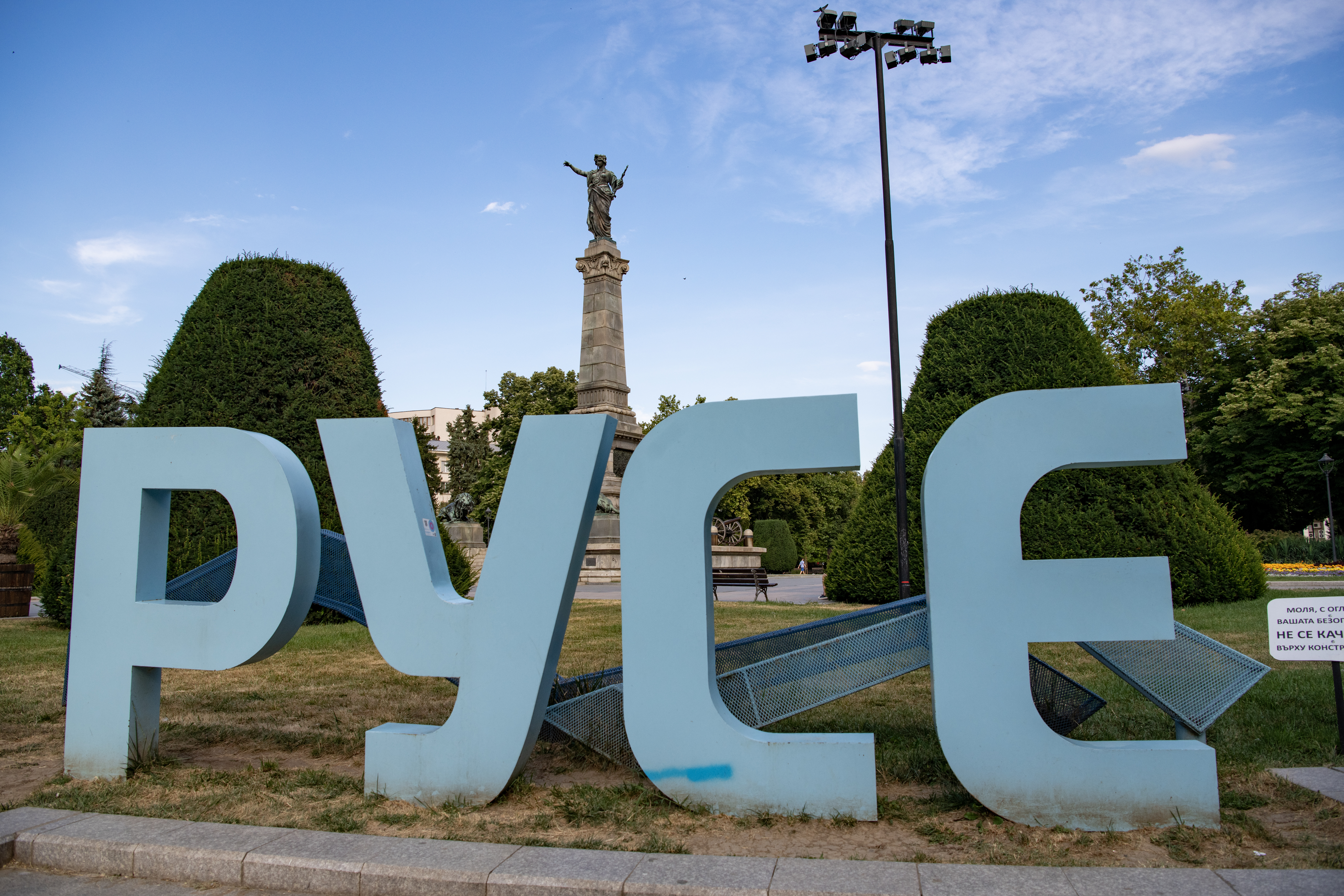
Ruse Freedom Monument

Historical population
Year	Pop.	±%
1946	215,361	—
1956	236,117	+9.6%
1965	273,226	+15.7%
1975	305,722	+11.9%
1985	315,762	+3.3%
1992	290,800	−7.9%
2001	268,074	−7.8%
2011	235,252	−12.2%
2021	193,483	−17.8%
Source: pop-stat.mashke.org

The Ruse province had a population of 266,213 (266,157 also given) according to a 2001 census, of which 48.7% were male and 51.3% were female.

As of the end of 2009, the population of the province, announced by the Bulgarian National Statistical Institute, numbered 249,144 of which 25.8% are inhabitants aged over 60 years.

=== Ethnic groups ===
Ethnic groups in Rousse Province (2011 census)
Ethnic group	Percentage
Bulgarians	81.4%
Turks	13.2%
Romani	4.0%
others and indefinable	1.4%

Total population (2011 census): 235 252

Ethnic groups (2011 census): Identified themselves: 216,612 persons:

- Bulgarians: 176,413 (81,44%)
- Turks: 28,658 (13,23%)
- Romani: 8,615 (3,98%)
- Others and indefinable: 2,926 (1,35%)

Ethnic groups according to the 2001 census, when 266,157 people of the population of 266,213 of Rousse Province identified themselves (with percentage of total population):

- Bulgarians: 213,408
- Turks: 37,050
- Romani: 9,703

=== Religion ===
Religions in Rousse Province (2001 census)
Religious group	Percentage
Orthodox Christian	80.9%
Muslim	15.8%
Roman Catholic Christian	0.2%
Protestant Christian	0.2%
others and indefinable	2.9%

Religious adherence in the province according to 2001 census:

Census 2001
religious adherence	population	%
Orthodox Christians	215,434	80.94%
Muslims	41,997	15.78%
Roman Catholics	567	0.21%
Protestants	482	0.18%
Other	1,596	0.60%
Religion not mentioned	6,081	2.29%
**total**	**266,157**	100%

== See also ==
- Provinces of Bulgaria
- List of villages in Rousse Province
