= List of Bulgarian-language poets =

The list of Bulgarian language poets includes those literary figures who are notable for their poetry written in the native tongue of Bulgaria. This language is also spoken in parts of Ukraine, Moldova, Turkey, Greece, Romania, and Serbia.

- Elisaveta Bagryana (1893–1991)
- Hristo Botev (1848–1876)
- Iana Boukova (1968–present)
- Atanas Dalchev (1904–1978)
- Dimcho Debelyanov (1887–1916)
- Blaga Dimitrova (1922–2003)
- Yordan Eftimov (1971–present)
- Dora Gabe (1886–1983)
- Georgi Gospodinov (1968–present)
- Pavel Matev (1924–2006)
- Geo Milev (1895–1925)
- Vanya Petkova (1944–2009)
- Stanka Pencheva (1929–2014)
- Radoy Ralin (1923–2004)
- Pencho Slaveykov (1866–1912)
- Petko Rachov Slaveykov (1827–1895)
- Hristo Smirnenski (1898–1923)
- Nikola Vaptsarov (1909–1942)
- Ivan Vazov (1850–1921)
- Peyo Yavorov (1878–1914)
- Nedyalko Yordanov (1940–present)
- Dimitar Kalev (1953–present)
