= Dimitar Kalev =

Bulgarian physician and poet

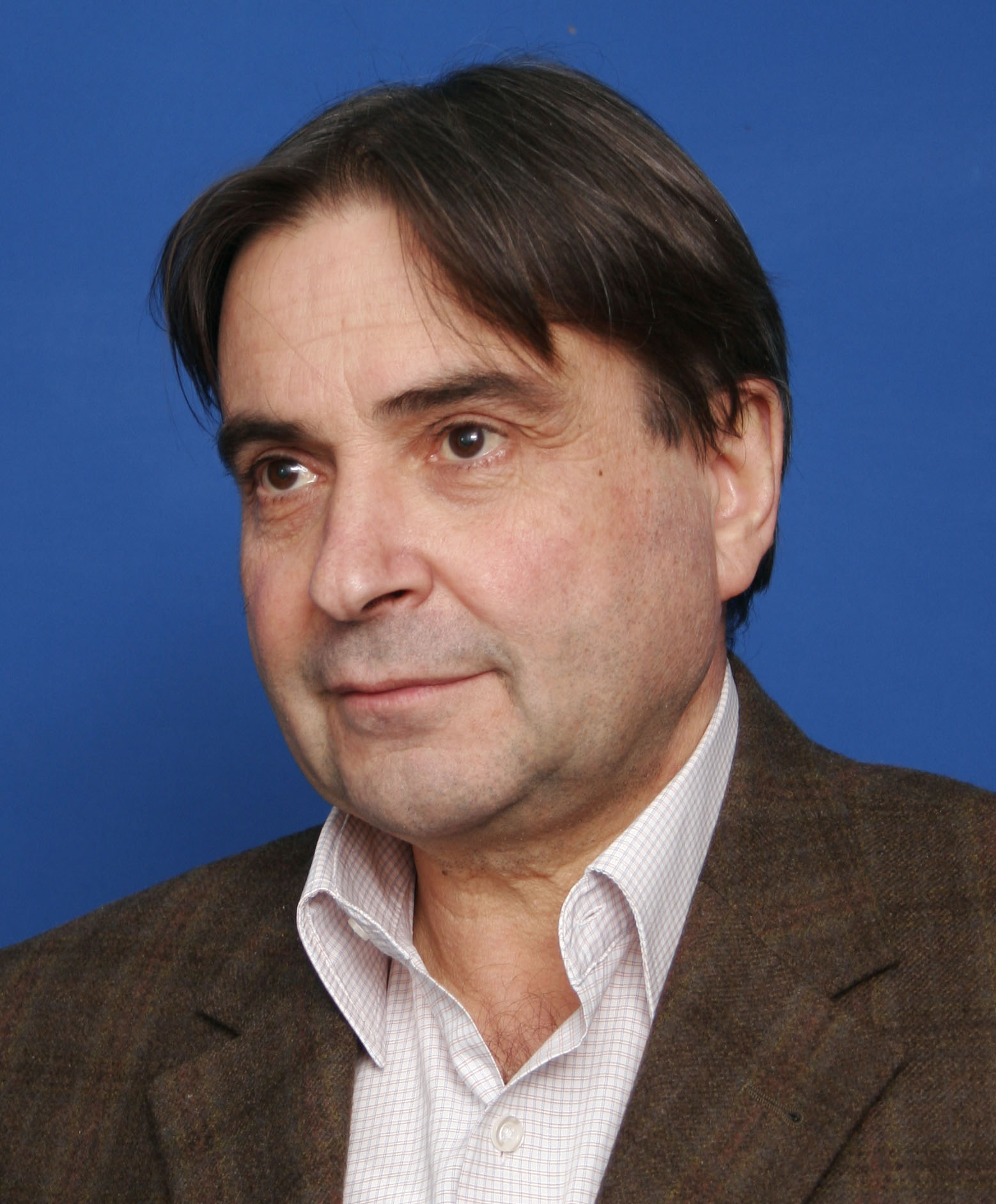
- Born: October 17, 1953 (age 72); Omurtag, Bulgaria
- Education: Medical University of Varna
- Occupations: Physician; Poet; Humanities scholar
- Writing career
- Genres: poem; essay; documentary chronicle; evidence-based clinical guidelines; epistemological research; humanitarian interpretations; esoteric research
- Subjects: oncology, cytology, pneumology, epistemology, esotericism
- Notable works: The Suffering of Light (1993) To Water Me Beyond (1996) Triad (2001) In Between (2006) Ether (2011) You Who Kill the Prophets (2020) Euterposophia (2022)
- Website: dimitar.kalevi.eu

Dimitar Nikolaev Kalev is a Bulgarian physician, poet and humanities scholar.

== Biography ==
Dimitar Kalev was born on October 17, 1953, in the town of Omurtag. In 1971, he graduated from a technical high school, obtained his medical degree in 1979, and holds specialties in internal medicine, pulmonology, phthisiology, and medical oncology. He has worked with the prominent Bulgarian pulmonologist Prof. Dr. Zlatan Zlatanov and one of the founders of Bulgarian clinical cytology – Assoc. Prof. Dr. Asen Zahariev. He holds a Ph degree and the academic title of associate professor.

== Medical career ==
Since 1986 until 2016, he taught pulmonology and clinical oncology at Medical University – Varna. In 1994 he published a mathematical model for cytological diagnosis of benign and malignant pleural effusions. In co-authorship with prof. Dr. Kosta Kostov published the monograph The Pleura (2006) and is a co-founder of the pulmonology journal InSpiro.

In 2010, he initiated the national project MORÈ (multidisciplinary oncology conversations and extracts), which annually establishes national expert boards in oncology and publishes evidence-based clinical practice guidelines. His initiative was to introduce the GRADE approach into Bulgarian oncology science as a system for assessing the quality of evidence and grading recommendations. The foundation MORE-Darzalas he created has been operating since 2015 and conducts various forms of expert creative activity and continuing medical education in oncology.

On his initiative, since 2013, the annual Wreath of Courage award has been awarded for contribution to Bulgarian clinical oncology.

In March 2022, he founded the Bulgarian Joint Cancer Network (BJCN) cluster and was elected as the first chairman of its board.

== Literary work ==
In 1971, he received the award from the magazine Rodna Rech for the best poem (Kotel). He was influenced by Yavorov, Lyubomir Levchev, Osip Mandelstam, Joseph Brodsky and Robert Frost. He published his first lyric collection, The Suffering of Light, in 1993. Next: To Water Me Beyond (1996), Triada (2001), In Between (2006), Ether (2011), You Who Kill the Prophets (2020) and Euterposophia (2022).

His publishers and editors are the writers Georgi Markovski, Vladimir Zarev, Angel G. Angelov, Elka Nyagolova and the literary critics Panko Anchev, Sava Vassilev and Ivan Granitski. Mikhail Nedelchev includes his poem The Alps in the anthology Europa. He received The Varna 2007 literary award for the poetry collection In Between, in which with the cycle Hexameters he revives the ancient verse structure (hexameter) in Bulgarian lyric poetry. He is the author of the libretto of the ballet performance Anna Karenina, laureate of The Varna 2009 award (together with Konstantin Iliev and Ekaterina Cheshmedzhieva). Since 2005 he has been on the editorial board of the literary magazine Prostori (published since 1961).He gravitates towards the literary circle Poslednite ognyari (The House with the Machine), together with Krassimir Simeonov, Angel G. Angelov, Temenuga Marinova, Hristo Leondiev, Yuri Luchev and others.

In 2024, he published a philosophical essay outlining the concept Literary emergentism as a direction in Literary theory.

== Humanities studies ==
As a humanities scholar he was influenced by Hegel, Rudolf Steiner and Paul Ricoeur. In 1999 published The Master in Varna – a documentary chronicle of the work of Petar Deunov, The Master, in Varna.

One of the initiators of the national conferences Petar Deunov, The Master, in the culture space of Bulgaria. Together with Dimitar Mangurov, Preslav Pavlov and Filip Filipov, he launched several original concepts for the work of Deunov as a cultural and religious phenomenon, including as a Bulgarian Reformation and The Being Bodhisattva in the 20th century. First proposes the morphology Self – Christ – The Other for structuralist reconstruction of the sermons and lectures of Deunov as text. Introduces different epistemological models for the speech of Deunov as oral public speech: formative judgments (ideal objectivity), moral breathing, emergentism (emergent perception), mental detachment and attachment, The Second Coming of Christ in the Etheric World, intesoctualism (neologism derived from intellectualism and esotericism), etc. In his monograph Petar Deunov, The Master (2022, from the series Duty and Honor) he tries to summarize all contemporary humanitarian interpretations of the problem.

Since 2014, in lectures and publications, he has presented the empirical social utopia for a four-part organization of society, in which four communities autonomously function and co-govern: economic, legislative, scientific-educational, and spiritual. He is an initiator and one of the editors of the electronic newspaper Synarchy.

== Recognition ==
According to Nikola Ivanov, Dimitar Kalev's lyrics contain a symbolic discourse with distant similarities to Ivan Tsanev and Boris Hristov. Yordan Eftimov defines it as poetry, philosophy and poetry science of the Pre-Socratics, and places Kalev himself in the category of "invisible poet". He is the recipient of the special award of the publishing house Zahariy Stoyanov for 2023.
