= Ezerovo, Plovdiv Province =

Coordinates: 42.017°N 25.297°E

Ezerovo (Bulgarian: Езерово [ˈɛzɛrovo]) is a village in southern Bulgaria, located within Parvomay Municipality, Plovdiv Province.

== Geography ==
The village of Ezerovo is situated at the foot of the Aida Mountains and Dragoyna Mountains on the bank of the Kayalikeka River, which is the geographic boundary between the Western and Eastern Rhodopes, flowing into the River Maritsa.

It is located near the villages of Bodrovo (2 km east), Water (6 km south) and Byala reka (Plovdiv region) | Byala reka (6 km northwest) . The closest town is the municipal center of Parvomay, 13 km northwest, and the closest regional town is Haskovo - 28 km east. Not far from the village are Mineral Batts of Haskovo. The size (area) of the village of Ezerovo is 26,318 km2.

The terrain of the countryside is hilly, filled with forests, gullies, hidden small plains, woods, and many meadows. The climate of the village is moderate-continental, with very frequent summer droughts. Precipitation is within 650 L/m^{2} and is unevenly distributed throughout the year. The most common winds are the western ones, called "Poriaza", and the southern ones, called "white winds", often come from southeast and bring a lot of rain. There are some of the rare species of animal and plant species in Bulgaria. The geographic location of the past is its economic growth: the proximity to the mountain and its pastures has determined the development of sheep farming, and the extensive agricultural lands from the north and west have favored the development of agriculture.

== History ==
The legend says that the village dates back to ancient Thracian times. An old name from the time of the Ottoman domination is the Yedi durali neighborhood (meaning "seven small neighborhoods"); then the village was situated on the territory of today's lake Ezerovo. After changing its geographic location, its name has been replaced by Diptys göl (meaning "lake without a bottom").

The date of the foundations found in the Thracian mound is V century B.C. A number of other ancient artifacts have been discovered, such as a golden diadem, small golden spoon, and bronze mirror. A gold ring with a Thracian tongue was found in 1912 when excavating a tombstone in the area of Prazenaka. The ring weighs 31.3 grams and the surface on which the letters are engraved has an elliptical shape measuring 1.7 x 2 cm.

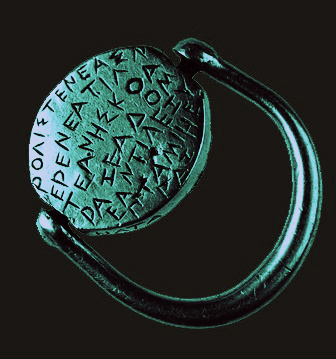
The Ring of Ezerovo, found in 1912 by two local villagers

On the ring an inscription is found written in a Greek script and consisting of 8 lines, the eighth of which is located on the edge, the rim, of the rotating disk; it reads: ΡΟΛΙΣΤΕΝΕΑΣΝ / ΕΡΕΝΕΑΤΙΛ / ΤΕΑΝΗΣΚΟΑ / ΡΑΖΕΑΔΟΜ / ΕΑΝΤΙΛΕΖΥ / ΠΤΑΜΙΗΕ / ΡΑΖ // ΗΛΤΑ.

The inscription on the ring is translated as follows:

Rolisten, I your wife am flying from joy towards
you and you lay down next to me in that sunny day.

In 1965, Bulgarian paleontologist Dimitar Kovatchev and his team discovered by Ezerovo an almost complete fossil skeleton of a Deinotherium giganteum, one of four found in the world to date; the skeleton is exhibited at the Sofia University Museum of Paleontology and Historical Geology, and a replica is exhibited in the Paleontological Museum in Asenovgrad.

== Sightseeing ==
=== St. Nicholas Cathedral ===
In the center of the village a main architectural landmark is the church "St. Nicholas", among the oldest churches in the area. Built in 1851 with the permission of the Ottoman Sultan, it was repaired in 1890. It is a three-nave structure without a dome and a bell tower. In later times a bell tower, standing 30 meters from the temple, was made. It is supposed that the icons were made by the iconic icon painter Nikola Odrinchanin. It has been repaired with donations, and now has a beautiful dome. The temple was mainly renovated in 2010.

=== Vanya Petkova House and Museum ===
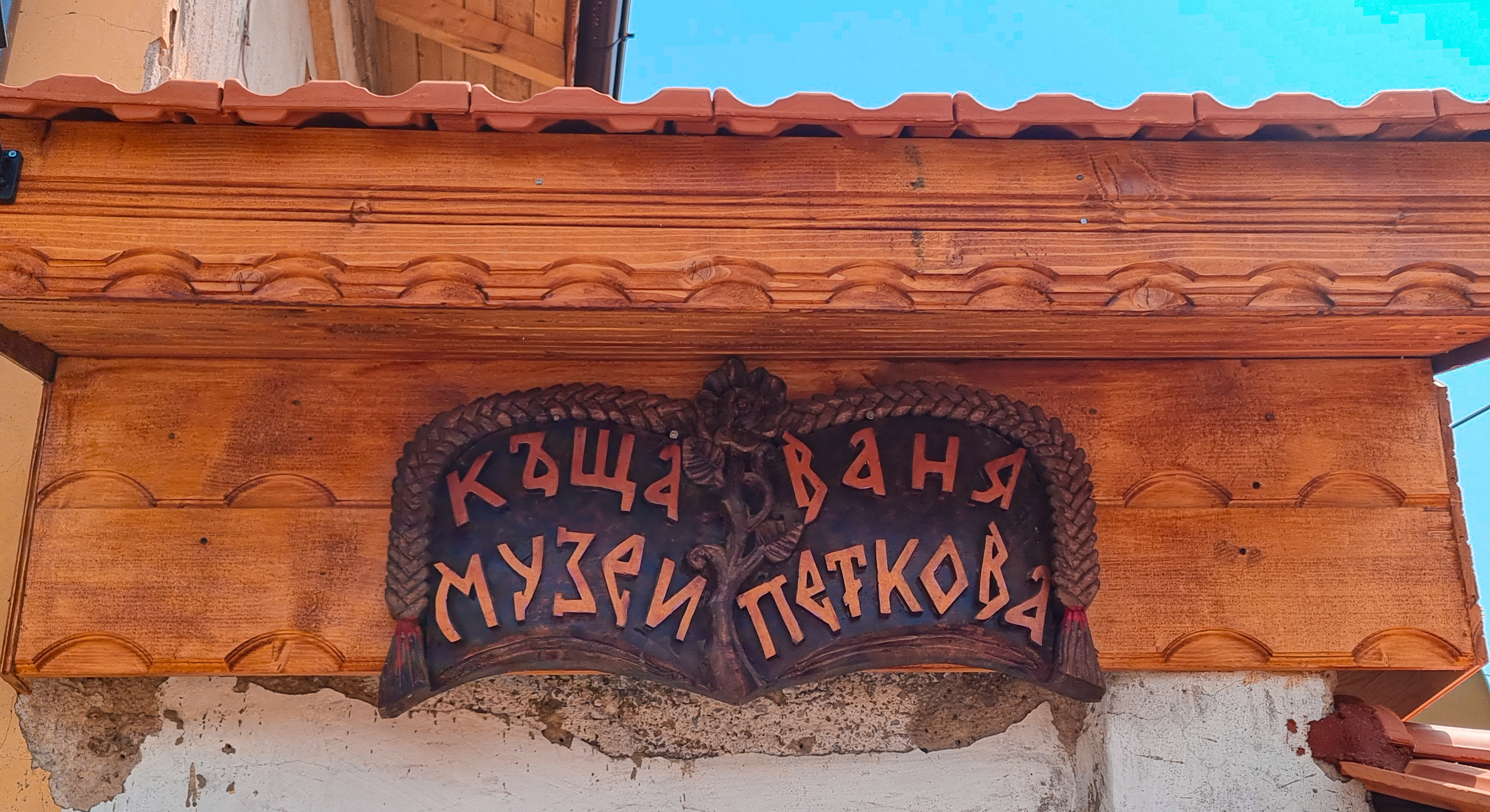
Vanya Petkova House and Museum

Among the main sights of the village is the house and museum of late Bulgarian poet Vanya Petkova. Situated at the very beginning of the village with a memorial plaque, donated by the municipality of the town of Parvomay. The house where Petkova wrote much of her work, and where she spent the last years of her life from 1999 to 2009, is celebrating her life and artistic career.

In the summer of 2021, the Palestinian Embassy in Bulgaria contributed to the museum by giving a small fountain with traditional ornaments, which was placed outside the main fence. All of Petkova's memorabilia including awards, journals, private diaries, unwritten work, paintings, dresses from performances, and personal typewriters are all displayed inside.

The museum house is currently being renovated, with an expected official opening to be held in 2024 by Petkova's family, as mentioned in a 2021 op-ed by her daughter, Bulgarian journalist Olia Al-Ahmed.

=== Martyrs Monument ===
About half a kilometer after the beginning of the village there is a monument with the names of all local people who died for Bulgaria's Liberation from Ottoman rule, some of them from Ezerovo.

=== Mineral Spring ===
About 3 km from the village there is a mineral spring named Chuchura, on which a fountain was built, opened on June 16, 1868, according to the inscription. At its foot there is a small natural pool, which is a great place to fish. Underground sometimes there are old bones of small fish. There is a reservoir, Ezerovo Lake.
