= Vanya Petkova =

Bulgarian poet (1944–2009)

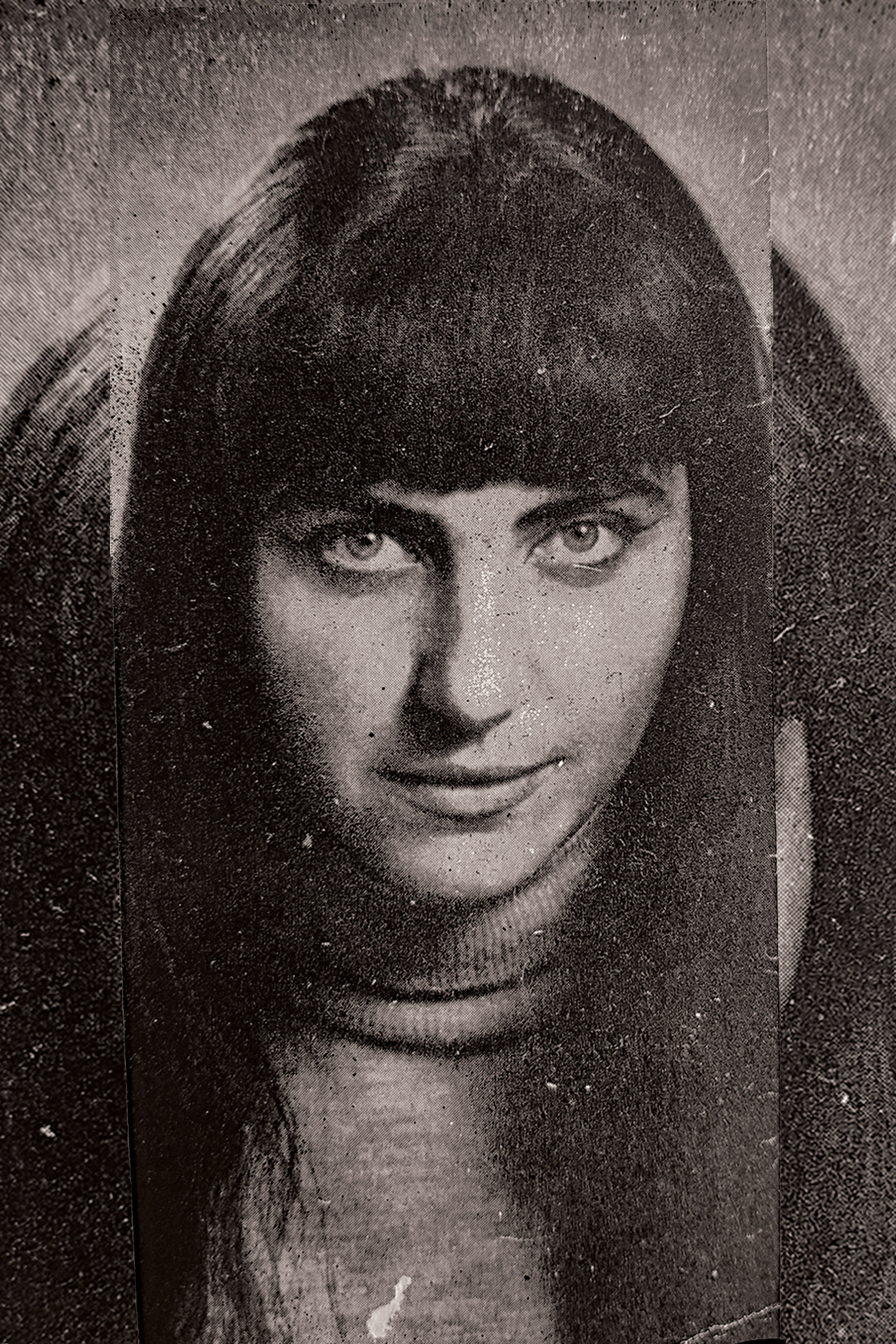
- Petkova in 1965
- Born: July 10, 1944; Sofia, Kingdom of Bulgaria
- Died: April 26, 2009 (aged 64); Parvomay, Bulgaria
- Resting place: Central Sofia Cemetery
- Other name: Hatija Sadiq Skander
- Education: Sofia University, Sofia, Bulgaria; Universidad Popular José Martí Havana, Cuba
- Known for: Salt Winds, Vow of Silence, The Sinner, Pirate Poems
- Notable work: The Sinner, Bullets in the Sand, Salty Winds, Pirate Poems
- Spouse: Nouri Sadik Oraby
- Children: Olia Al-Ahmed
- Awards: Bulgarian Writers Union Award 1985; The Golden Century Award, 2005; Unifier Of Cultures (posthumous) 2019
- Memorials: Vanya Petkova House and Museum in Ezerovo, Purvomay, Bulgaria; Vanya Petkova Resting Place in Central Sofia Cemetery

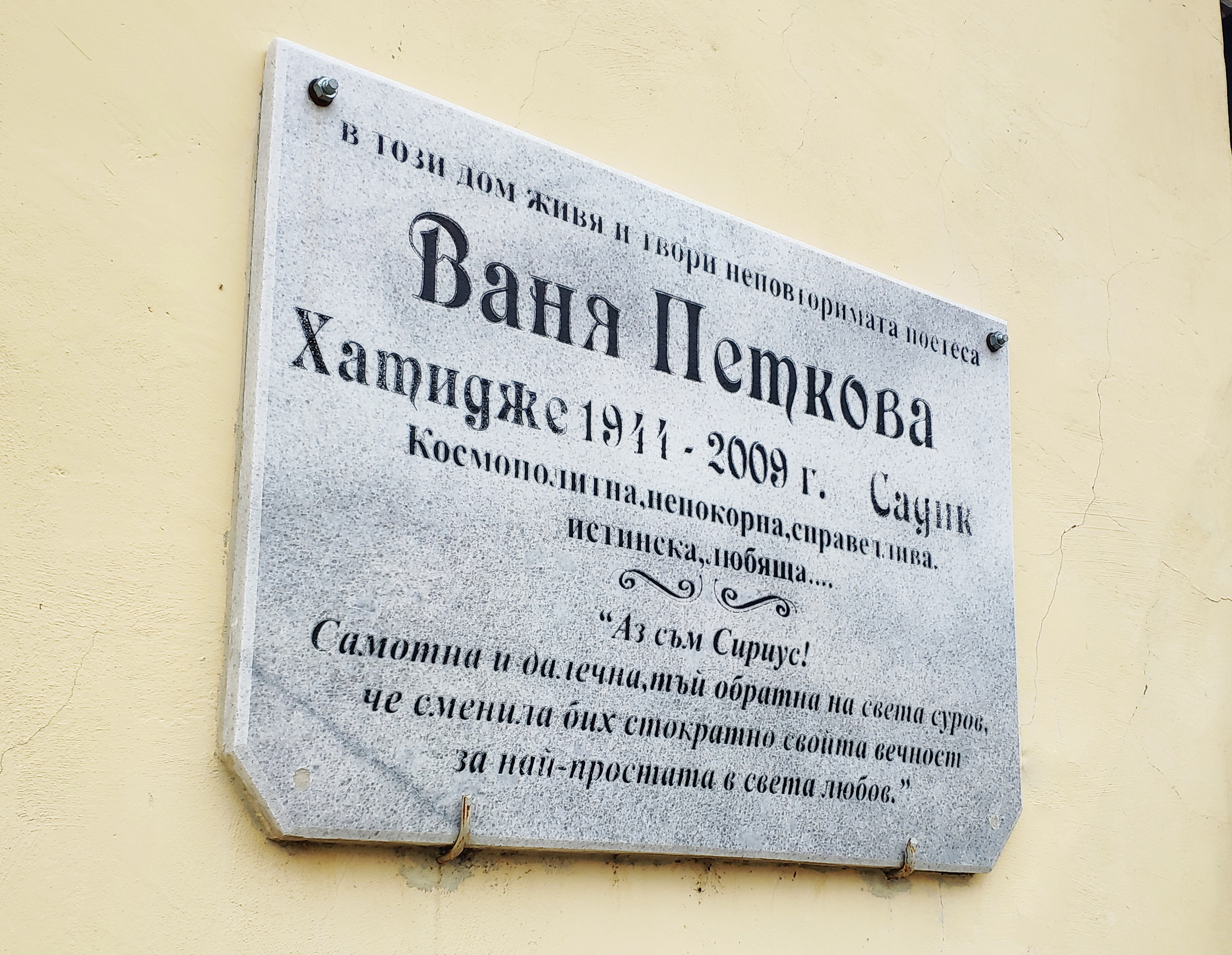
The memorial plaque on the house in Ezerovo, Plovdiv, where Petkova lived and worked from 1999 to 2009. The plaque was donated by the Municipality of the town of Purvomay, in 2010.

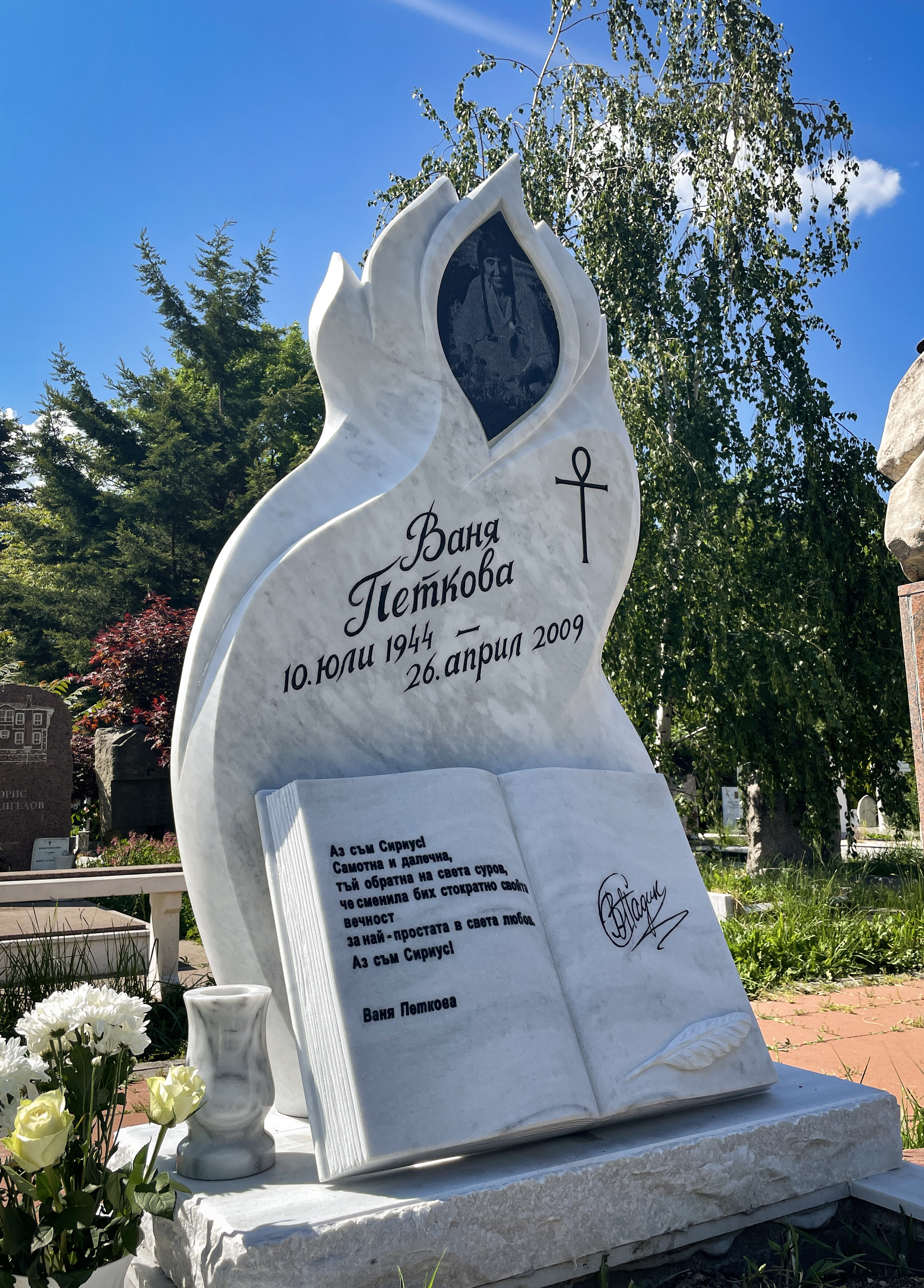
The headstone of Vanya Petkova's grave at Central Sofia Cemetery

Vanya Petkova (Bulgarian: Ваня Петкова; July 10, 1944 – April 26, 2009) was a Bulgarian poet, novelist, short story writer, and translator of Bulgarian, Ukrainian and Greek descent.

Petkova is widely regarded as one of the most consequential Eastern European poets, with a total of 36 books to her name, and most notably, she is considered the first poet in history to perform theatrical poetry aboard a passenger aircraft, having performed on three separate occasions in four different languages. Her poetry has been translated to thirteen languages, including English, Spanish, French, Russian, Greek, Armenian, Polish, Czech, Hindi, Arabic and Japanese among other.

Petkova worked as a cultural envoy for Bulgaria's diplomatic mission to Havana, Cuba from 1974 to 1978 where she learned Spanish and received her PhD in Latin American Culture and Literature at the José Marti University, shortly after majoring in German at the University of Sofia. She also studied Arabic in Damascus, Syria, and has also worked as a diplomatic interpreter at the Bulgarian Embassy in Khartoum, Sudan. Vanya Petkova has translated the works of a number of Western and Middle Eastern writers to Bulgarian and was a member of the European Writers' Council.

Nicknamed "The Amazon of Bulgarian Literature" by critics, Vanya Petkova is widely considered to be the most cosmopolitan poet in the Balkans. She was fluent in seven languages and her work has notably spread throughout five continents and was translated to thirteen languages.

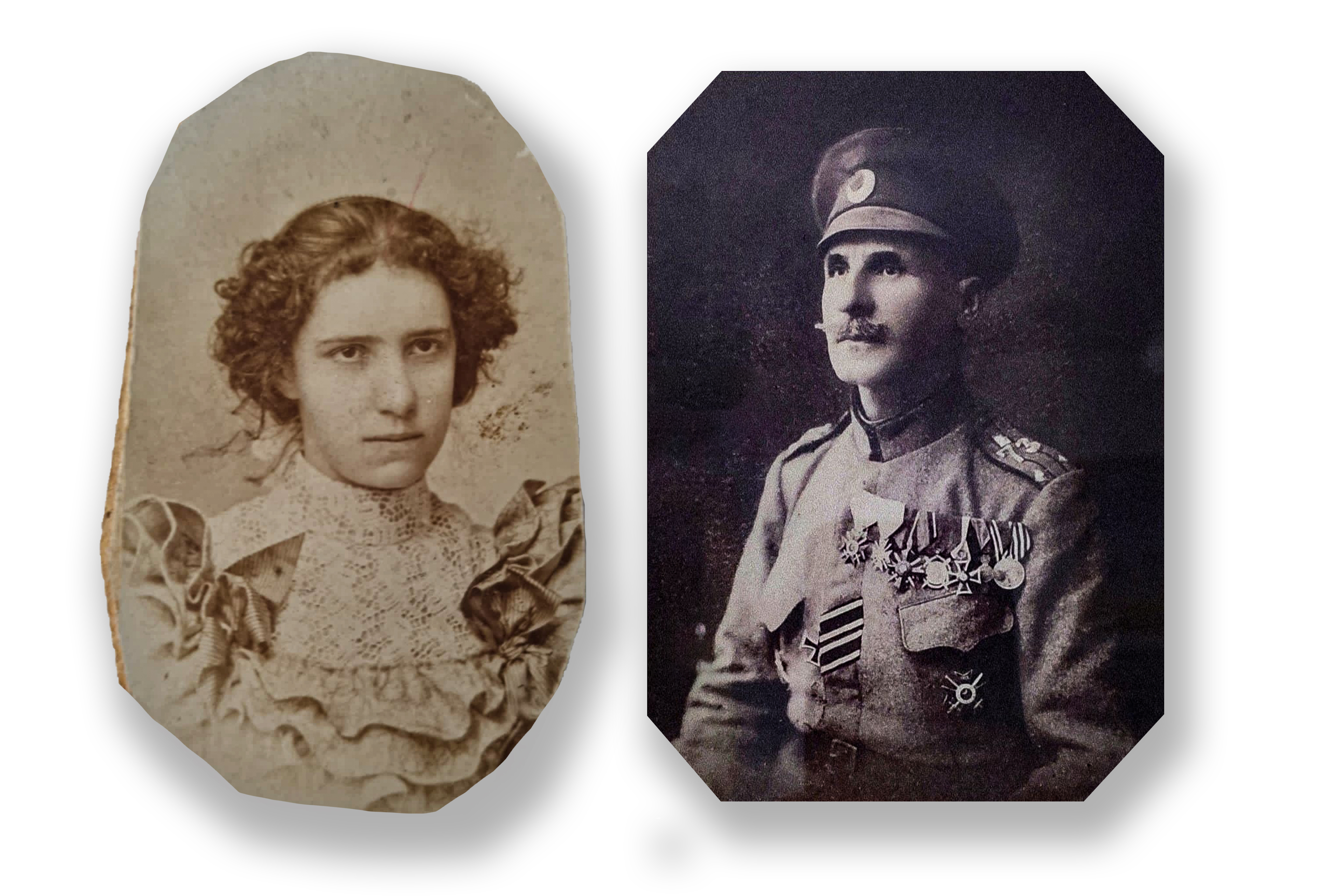
Petkova's paternal grandmother Anastasia Zhitskaya from Ukraine, and her grandfather - general Ivan Skander.

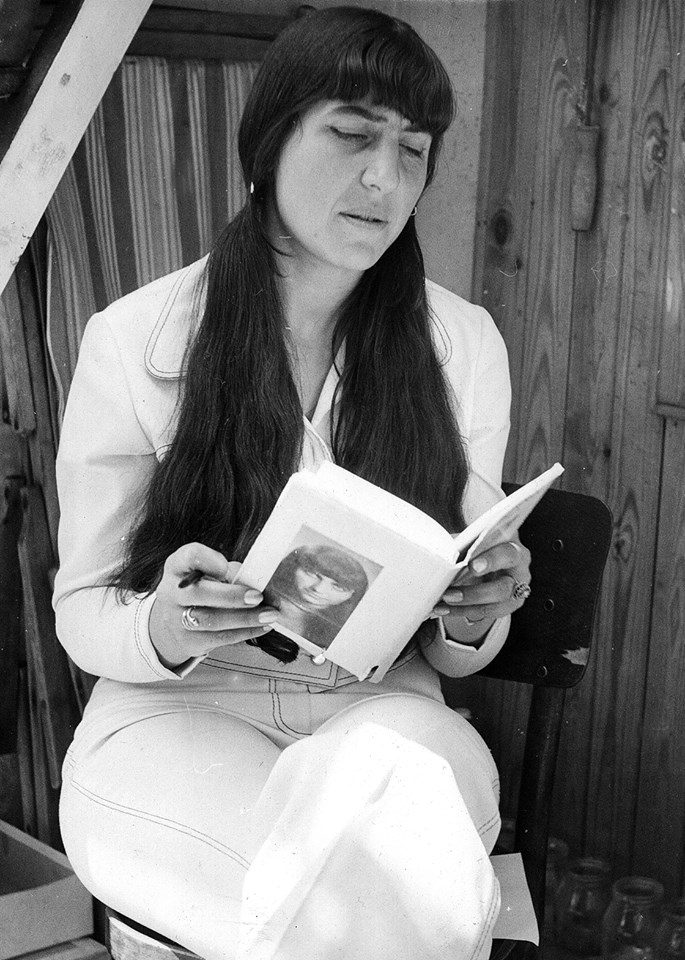
Vanya Petkova reading her newly released book The Sinner, 1967

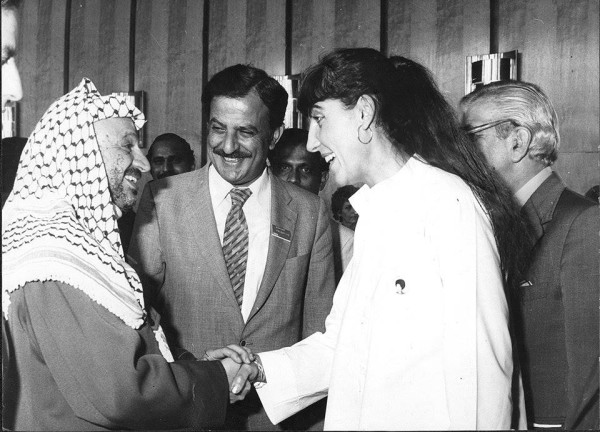
Bulgarian poet Vanya Petkova with Palestinian leader and Nobel Peace Prize Winner Yasser Arafat

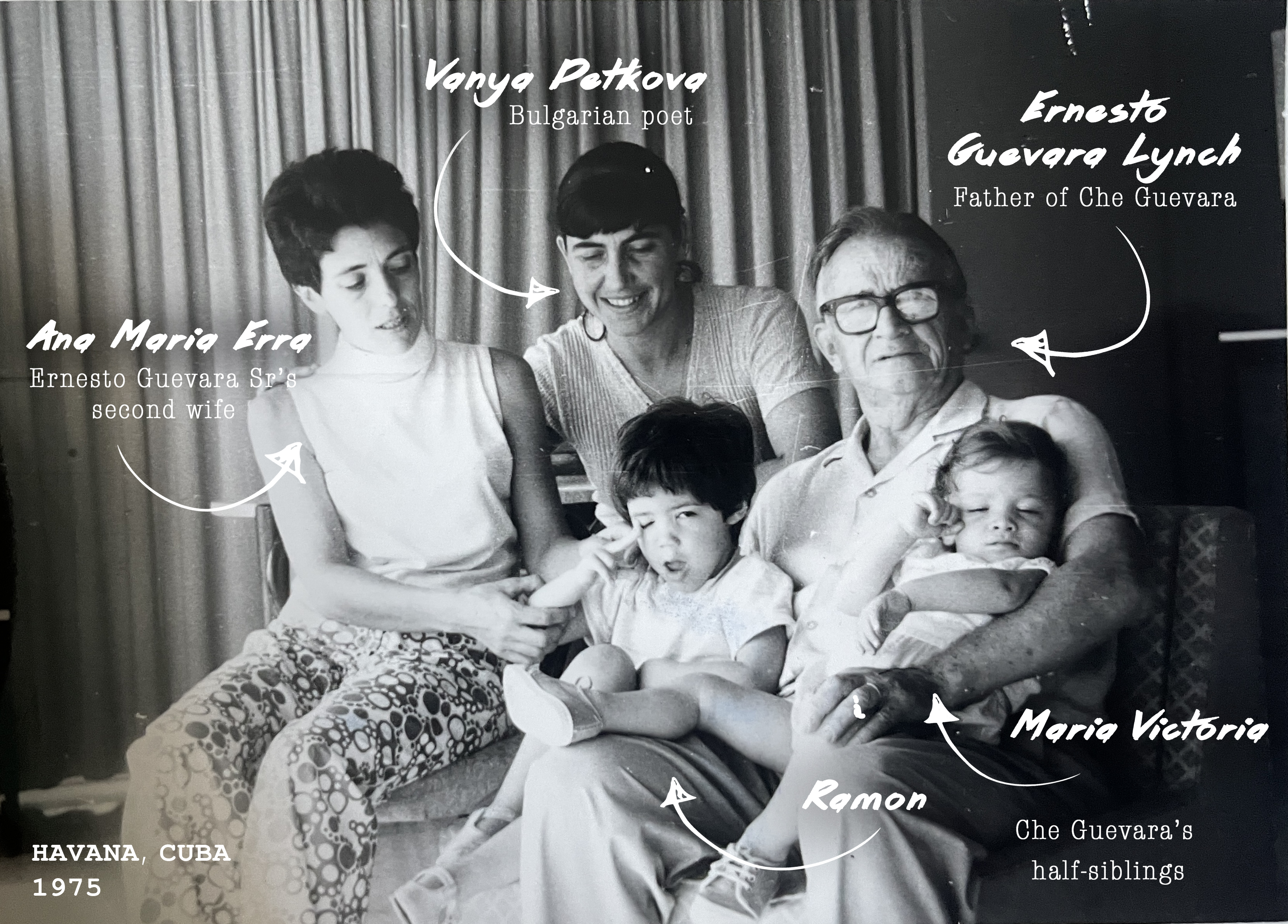
Renowned Bulgarian poet Vanya Petkova with Ernesto Guevara Lynch (Father of Che Guevara) and the Guevara family in Havana, Cuba (1975)

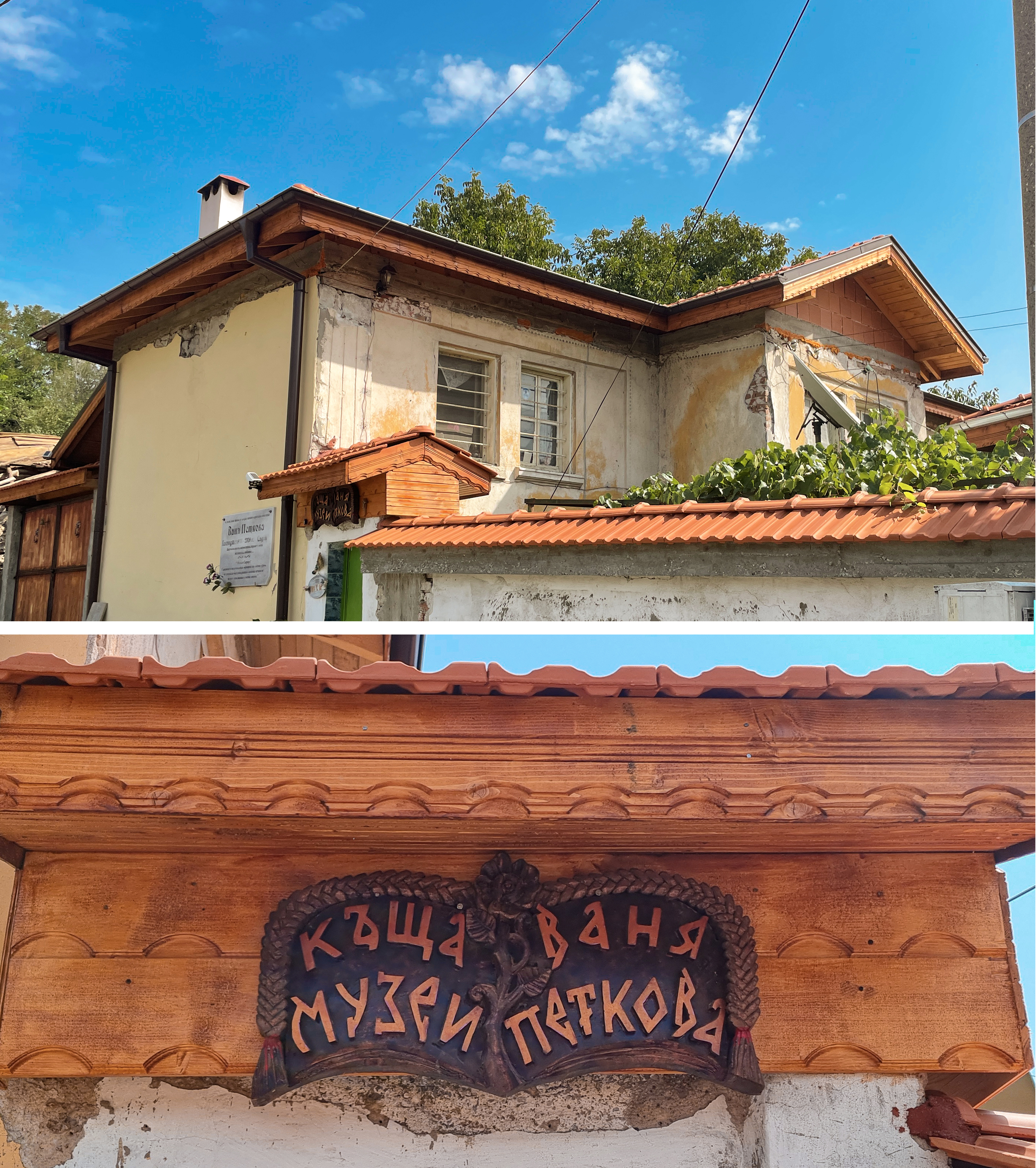
"The Vanya Petkova House and Museum" in Ezerovo, Plovdiv, Bulgaria. The house where Petkova spent the last 10 years of her life, from 1999 to 2009, and where she wrote much of her work.

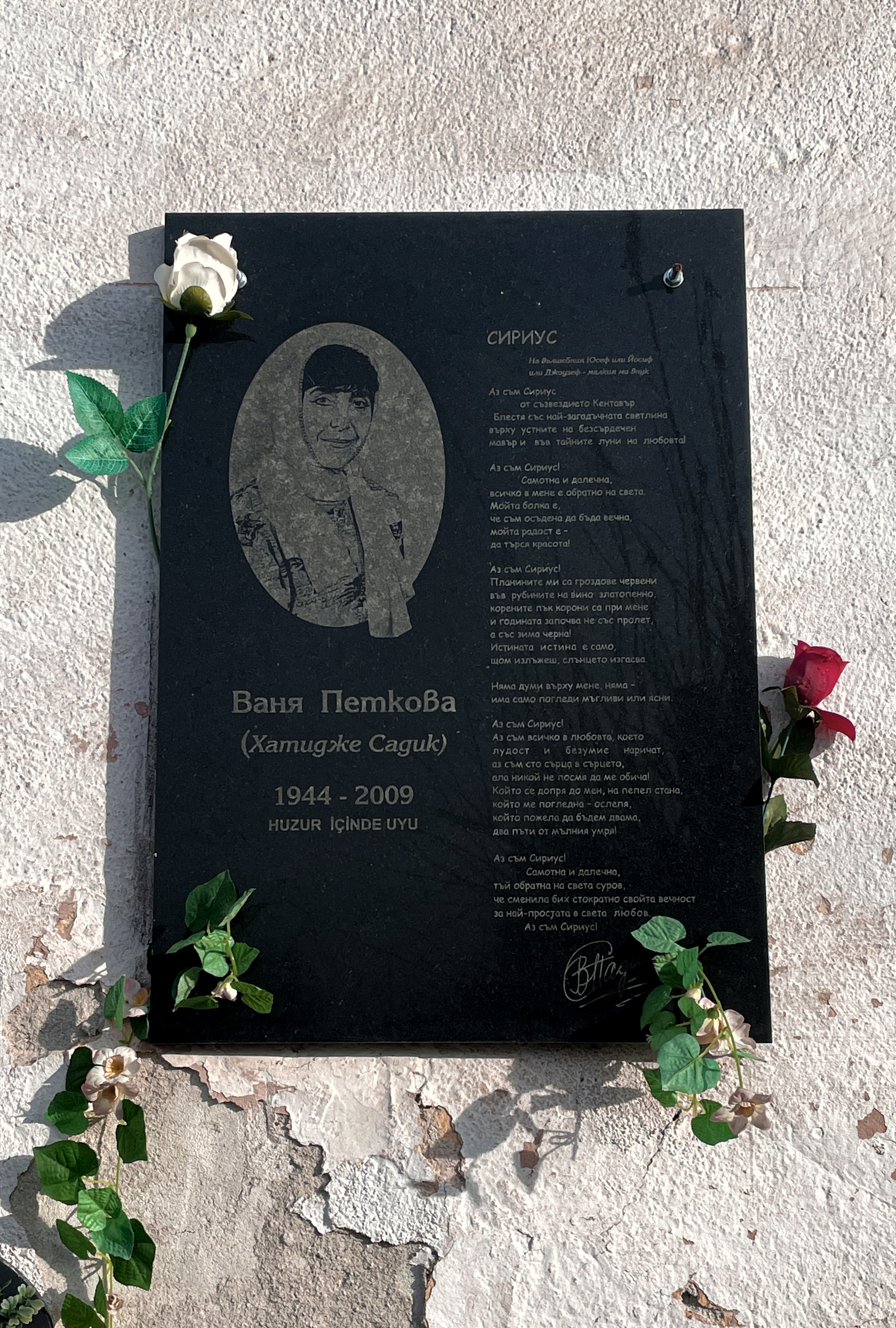
Vanya Petkova Memorial Plaque on her house in Ezerovo (Lakeville), Parvomay, Bulgaria

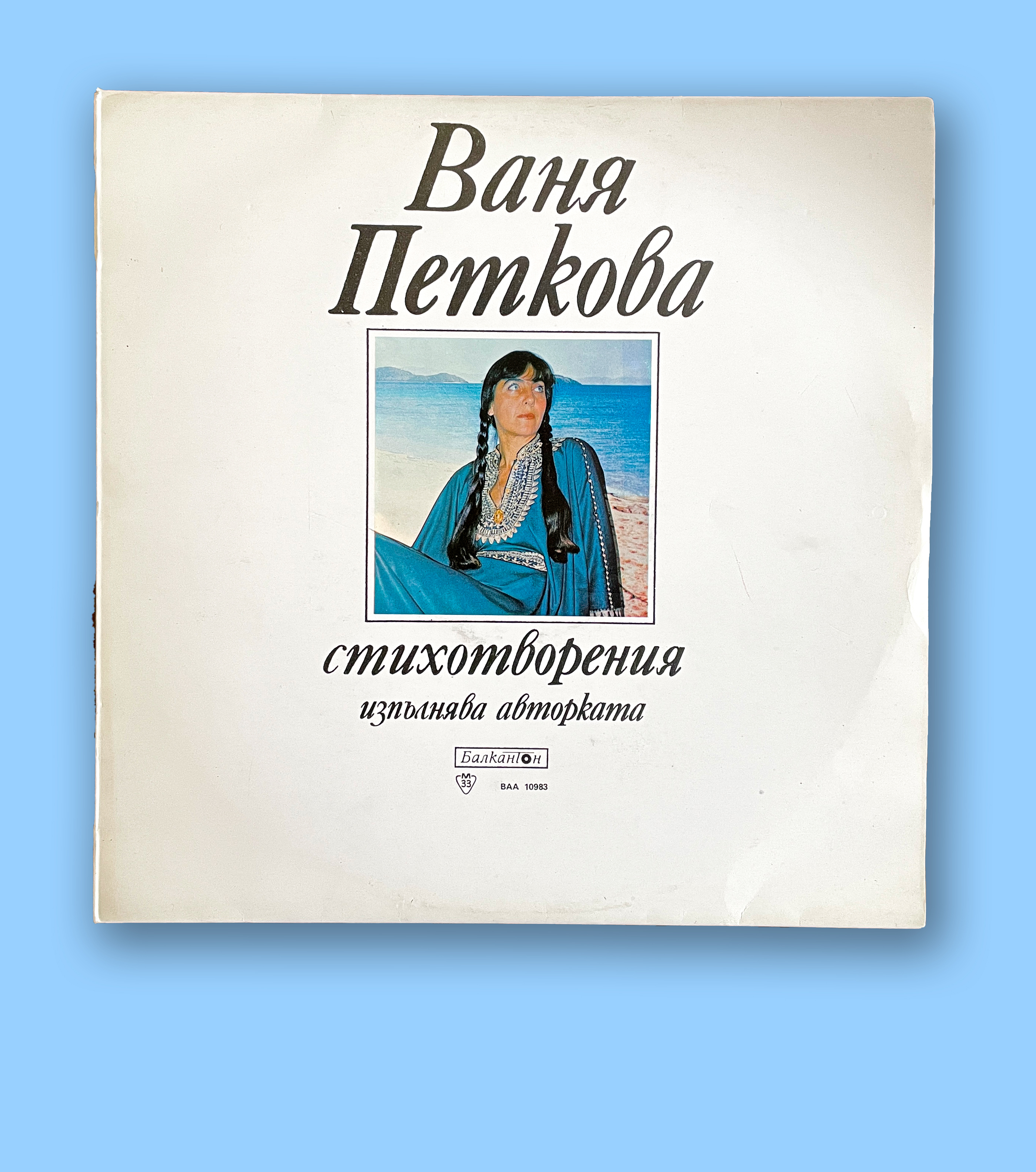
Vanya Petkova's Vinyl Record, released in 1982 by Balkanton.

== Life ==
=== Family history ===
Born on July 10, 1944, during the immediate aftermath of the air Bombing of Sofia in World War II, to her father Peter – a son of Russian-Ukrainian immigrants, and to her mother Vassilisa – a half-Greek, half-Bulgarian tailor. Her grandfather Ivan Skander was an army general of Russian-Circassian descent who served under Tsar Nicholas II, and left Russia for Bulgaria shortly after the start of the Russian Civil War of 1917 as part of the white émigré, along with his wife – Ukrainian countess Anastasia Zhitskaya, Petkova's paternal grandmother. In the early days of Petkova's career, these facts allegedly served as the main reason for a ban imposed on her poetry by Bulgaria's Communist Party, although the official explanation was "due to erotic content found in her poems". The ban was later lifted because of Petkova's growing popularity in the country.

=== Literary career ===
Petkova's literary debut was in 1959, when her original poem titled Dream was published in a local newspaper, and was noticed by established Bulgarian female poet Dora Gabe. In 1965 her debut collection titled Salty Winds was published, and between 1970 and 1973 she worked as an editor and editor-in-chief for Bulgarian newspapers Slaveyche and Literaturen Front. She also worked as a translator at the Bulgarian Embassy in Khartoum, Sudan – the homeland of her husband Dr. Nouri Sadiq Oraby, a Sudanese geography teacher of Nubian descent, whom she met as a student at the Sofia State University, and married in 1966.

In 1967 they had their only child Olga-Jacqueline. The same year, Petkova published her second poetry book titled Bullets In The Sand, followed by her third and most popular piece The Sinner, which was subsequently banned by the Bulgarian Communist Party because of the verse "There! Sinner – I am! I say what I think and kiss whose lips I desire, and eyes as azure as lakes, and eyes as dark as hazelnut I besplotch." Petkova was accused of "anti-communist propaganda and incitement of immoral behavior". The ban would be lifted a year later because of Petkova's growing popularity in the country. The book was issued a year later without censorship, lifting Petkova's popularity to the highest levels in the late 60s and yearly 70s.

Petkova was fluent in seven languages in total, starting with her major in Slavic Philology at the University of Sofia, followed by a minor in German and English. In 1974 she began a short-lived diplomatic career after being appointed deputy cultural envoy of Bulgaria to Cuba, where Petkova would learn Spanish and later specialize in Latin American studies at the Jose Marti Institute of Foreign Languages at the Havana University from 1974 to 1978.

Although mostly known for her romantic poetry, Vanya Petkova frequently used her artistic skills in the fight against the injustice committed towards people of color, becoming an important voice against racism and xenophobia in Eastern Europe among artists. In her poem titled Ray Charles, dedicated to the legendary American musician Ray Charles, Petkova writes: "Talk to me of Ray Charles' America, that of the colored, of whose love I have born! And let the Blacks' deep voices keep blessing you all, when white America someday bursts open aflame! And when that happens my dear – Wide open your arms and better tell me the story of Ray Charles!" . It is reported that Petkova had close ties with American social activist Angela Davis, writers Pablo Neruda, William Saroyan, and South African singer Miriam Makeba amongst others.

From 1992 until 1997, Petkova lived in Ukraine – her paternal grandmother's homeland. While in Odessa, she translated the works of a number of Ukrainian writers and poets to Bulgarian, and began writing her autobiographical novel, titled God is Love, which remained unfinished.

In 1999, Petkova moved to Ezerovo, a Bulgarian village in the Rhodope mountains region, where she spent the last 10 years of her lifetime until 2009, and where she created her last work, among which the short novel We Are Also Bulgaria, and her last collection of poems titled Pirate Poems – dedicated to American actor and musician Johnny Depp.

Petkova's house is Ezerovo has been turned into a symbolic museum of her legacy and is taken care of by her daughter and grandchildren.

=== Notable awards and achievements ===
Petkova has conducted over 800 stage performances all over the world, including two on board a flying passenger airplane en route from Sofia to Moscow in 1983, for which her name was submitted to the Guinness World Records, and remains the only poet in history to ever do it.

Vanya Petkova is considered to be the only Bulgarian poet with an official phonograph record titled Vanya Petkova Poems, which was released in 1982 by Bulgaria's largest distributor at the time – Balkanton. The vinyl consists of poems recited by the author herself.

Vanya Petkova is also the author of a number of song lyrics, including Disco by Bulgarian rock-'n'-roll band Trick with lead singer Etienne Levy, Younga's Love by Margaret Nikolova, The Rabbit by Bulgarian rock band Dissonance, The Old Bells by Yordan Marchinkov (nominated Melody of The Year), and the symbolic anthem of the Armenian Community in Bulgaria titled Armenian Eyes and composed by Haygashot Agasyan, among others.

In 1991, Petkova was officially featured in the second volume of the American Encyclopedia of Continental Women Writers, alongside Bulgaria's Elisaveta Bagryana and Blaga Dimitrova.

In 2005 Vanya Petkova was awarded with Bulgaria's Georgi Jagarov National Literary Award.

In 2005 she was awarded with the prestigious Golden Century Award by the Bulgarian Ministry of Culture for lifetime achievements and contributions to the culture of the country and the world.

In 2011 Vanya Petkova's name was posthumously featured in the ninth volume of the National Encyclopedia Bulgaria, published by BAS.

In 2019, Vanya Petkova was posthumously awarded the honorary title "Unifier of Cultures" by the Bulgarian Union of Spanish-speaking Journalists.

In 2021, the book Pirate Poems was fully translated from Bulgarian to English by Snezhana Sokolova and republished in Los Angeles, California by Vanya Petkova's youngest grandson, actor and director Joseph Al Ahmad.

In 2023, a copy of Pirate Poems was officially and personally presented to Johnny Depp by Joseph Al Ahmad, to whom it was dedicated by Petkova, back in 2009.

During her long journey, she got to know the likes of William Saroyan, Bulat Okudzhava, Yasser Arafat, Che Guevara's father Ernesto Guevara Lynch, Fidel Castro, Yevgeny Yevtushenko, Angela Davis, and Miriam Makeba among others.

Petkova's last book in her lifetime would become Pirate Poems (2009) – a compilation of her most notable work with five additional newly written poems, two of which were written in English by Petkova herself, and dedicated to American actor Johnny Depp. The book Pirate Poems itself was also dedicated to Johnny Depp – the screen actor Vanya Petkova admired most, as claimed by her family. The book was republished in 2021 by her grandson, actor Joseph Al-Ahmad, in the United States.

A year after Petkova's passing, in November 2010, the bilingual book An Armenian Song was issued with the assistance of the Armenian Embassy in Bulgaria, becoming the first posthumous book by Petkova. The official premiere of its publication was held on December 2, 2010, at Saint Cyril and Methodius National Library in Sofia.

== Death ==
A week after publishing what would become her last book during her lifetime – Pirate Poems;

On April 26, 2009, aged 64, Petkova died from cardiac arrest in the small Bulgarian town of Parvomay, located in the Rhodope Mountains. She would be laid to rest days later at Bulgaria's Central Sofia Cemetery.

Petkova's memorial service was held on April 29, 2009, at Central Sofia Cemetery in the Bulgarian capital Sofia, with her husband Nouri, daughter Olga-Jacqueline, grandchildren Joseph and Nasser, friends, colleagues and admirers of her poetry all present. Petkova's resting site is in the Notable Figures' quarter at Central Sofia Cemetery Park.

In the preface taken from Pirate Poems she writes:

"Why have I called my poems "Pirate"? Because each one was stolen from the meager moments of joy in my wild and turbulent life. My poetry wasn’t composed in comfort, before a screen. It was born between slaps and fistfights, gunshots and knife-throws, handcuffs and bloodstains—in daring escapes, desert adventures in Syria and Sudan, aboard airplanes and steamboats, among thugs and outcasts, between outrageous children and ungrateful darlings, caught between Heaven and Earth, Life and Death. Born to pirates, I lived as one; piracy runs in my blood."

–Vanya Petkova, (1944 - 2009)

== Memorials ==
Vanya Petkova House and Museum

Vanya Petkova's house, located in Ezerovo (Lakeville) – a small village in the Bulgarian Rhodope Mountains region, where Petkova wrote much of her work, and where she spent the last years of her life from 1999 to 2009, has been turned into a symbolic museum celebrating her life and artistic career. All of Petkova's memorabilia including awards, journals, private diaries, unpublished work, paintings, dresses from her performances, and personal typewriters are all displayed inside. The museum house is currently being renovated, with an expected official opening to be held in 2024 by Petkova's family, as mentioned in a 2021 op-ed by her daughter, Bulgarian journalist Olia Al-Ahmed.

== Notable work ==
- 1965 – Salty Winds
- 1967 – Bullets in the Sand
- 1967 – Attraction
- 1967 – The Sinner
- 1968 – Nunche, Grandpa Kachi's Granddaughter
- 1968 – Contemporary Arab Poets, an anthology
- 1970 – Prediction
- 1972 – The Black Dove
- 1973 – Chestnut Love
- 1973 – Oli, Oli, Snail
- 1976 – The Reversed River
- 1979 – The Vow of Silence,
- 1980 – Venceremos - lyrical essays on Cuba,
- 1980 – The Blue Book
- 1981 – Triptych
- 1981 – In the battle between the two worlds. Documents. Volume II (co-author),
- 1984 – Thunder
- 1984 – Gypsy Romance
- 1988 – Earthquake
- 1989 – Forgiveness
- 1998 – Passions 1
- 2005 – Passions 2
- 2006 – The Sinner 1 - remake
- 2008 – The Sinner 2 - remake
- 2008 – Topics and essays in literature. - a series of topics and essays for Bulgarian students from 9th to 12th grade (co-author).
- 2009 – Pirate Poems - dedicated to Johnny Depp.
- 2009 – The Golden Apple - the last translation from Ukrainian, love lyrics by Dmitry Pavlichko.
- Posthumously Published:
- 2010 – An Armenian Song - a collection of poems in two languages published by Demax with the assistance of the Armenian Embassy in Bulgaria. The premiere was held on December 2, 2010, at the National Library in Sofia. The poet's daughter - journalist and translator Olya Al-Ahmed is the compiler and author of the foreword, the design is by Vanya Petkova's grandson - Joseph Al Ahmad.
- 2012 – And We Are Bulgaria - a series of short stories and novels.
- 2021 – Pirate Poems by Vanya Petkova - the American edition of Pirate Poems (2009), republished in Los Angeles, California, by Vanya Petkova's grandson - Joseph Al-Ahmad, and dedicated to actor Johnny Depp.
- 2024 – I Am Sirius - collection of poems commemorating 80 years since her birth.
- 2024 – God Is Love - her never-before seen secret autobiographical novel, published 15 years after her death. The novel was accidentally discovered in a hidden archive in her home in Ezerovo, Bulgaria, with a short note on top which says "To be published after my death".
