= Central Sofia Cemetery =

Cemetery in Sofia, Bulgaria

Coordinates: 42.7164°N 23.3330°E

- Централни софийски гробища
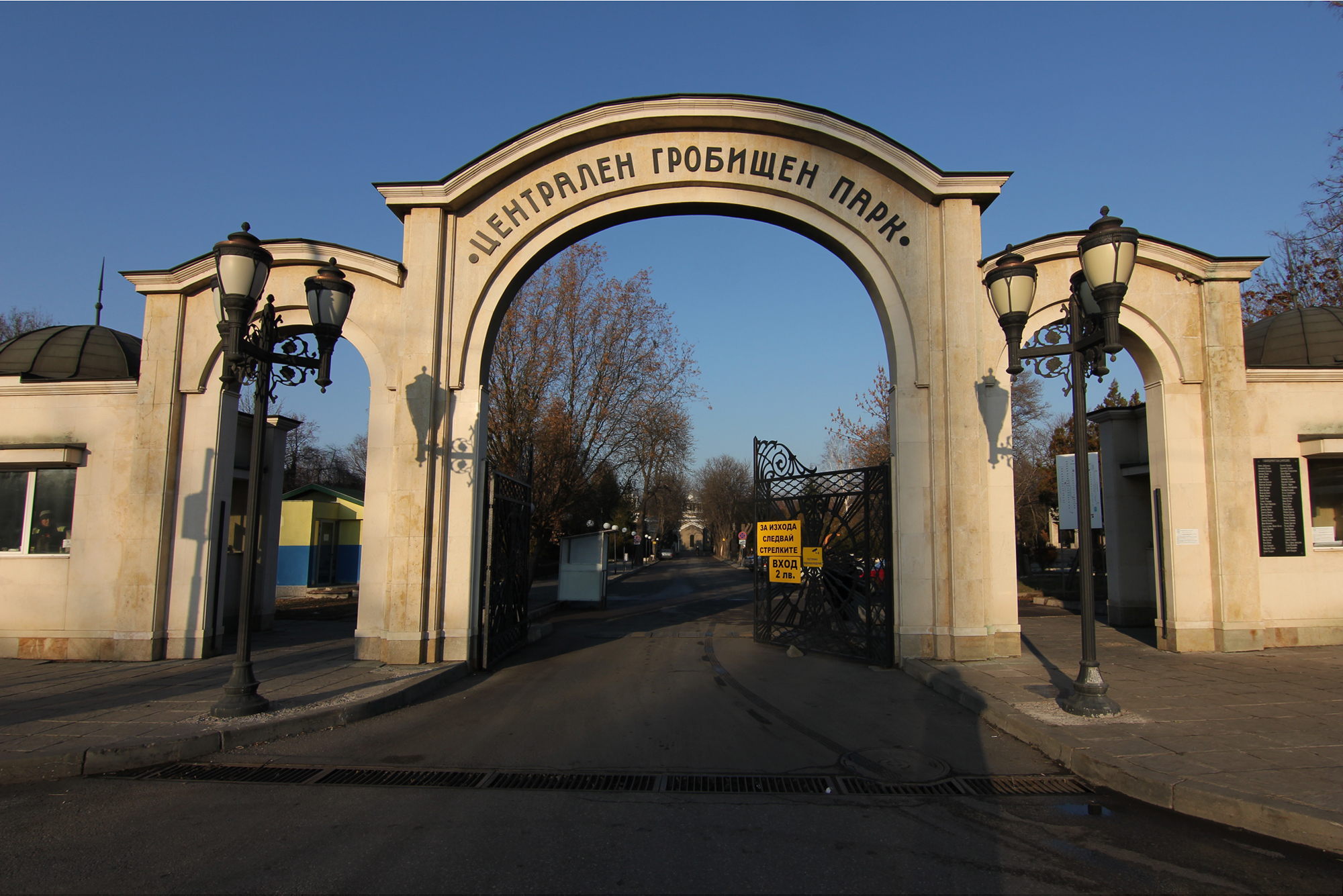
- The main entrance
- Interactive map of Central Sofia Cemetery

Details
- Established: 1889
- Location: Sofia
- Country: Bulgaria
- Size: 913 hec

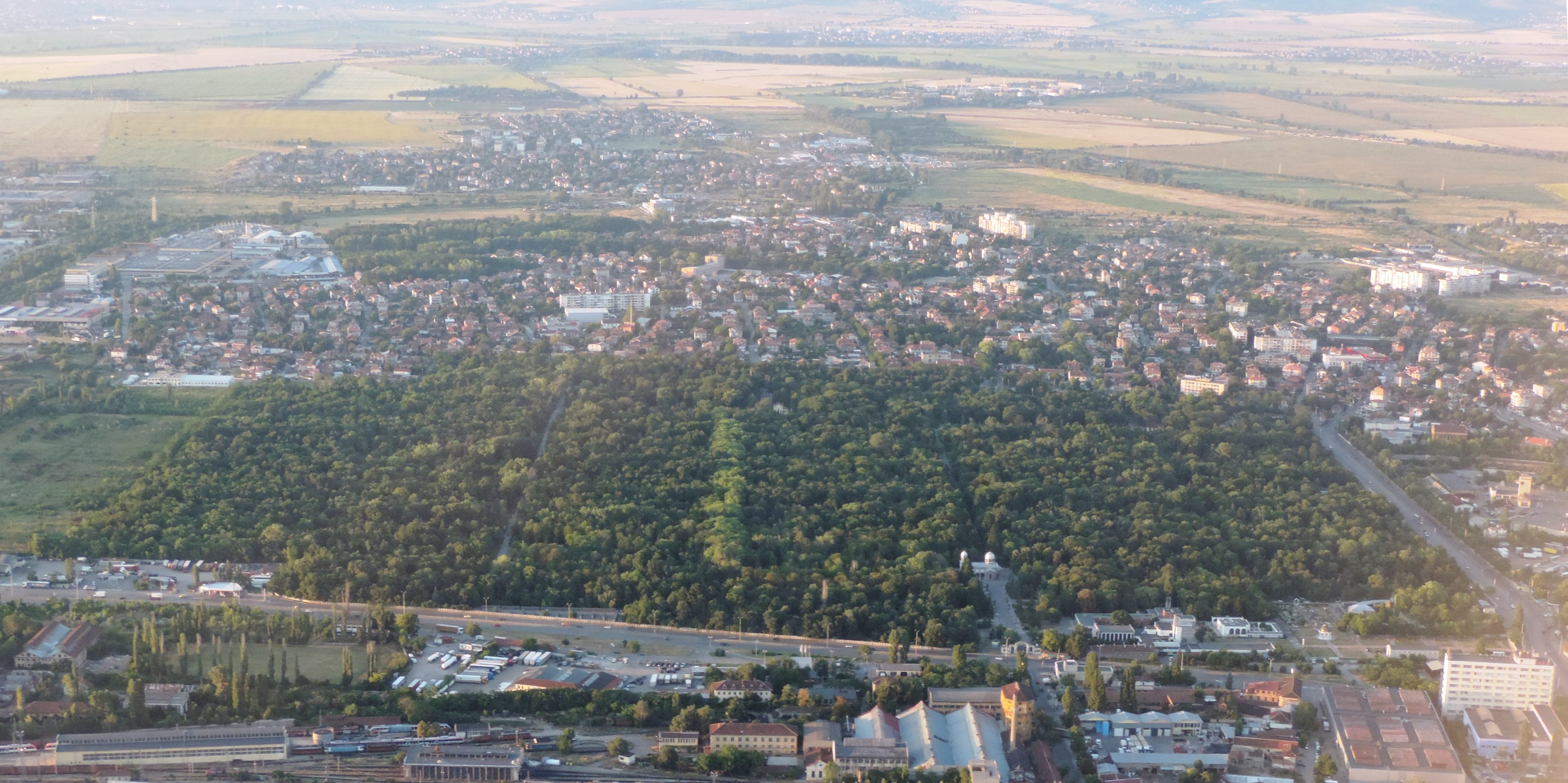
Aerial view of the whole cemetery

The Central Sofia Cemetery (Bulgarian: Централни софийски гробища, romanized: Tsentralni sofiyski grobishta) or the Orlandovtsi Cemetery ("Орландовци") is the main cemetery in Sofia, the capital of Bulgaria.

The cemetery has several chapels used by various Christian denominations, such as a Bulgarian Orthodox church of the Dormition of the Theotokos, a Roman Catholic chapel of Saint Francis of Assisi, an Armenian Apostolic chapel, a Jewish synagogue, etc. The cemetery also features Russian, Serbian, Romanian and British military sections.

== Notable interments ==
- Georgi Asparuhov, footballer
- Elisaveta Bagryana, Bulgarian writer and poet
- Blaga Dimitrova, Bulgarian poet and 2nd Vice-President of non-Communist Bulgaria
- Georgi Dimitrov, Prime Minister of Bulgaria
- Ghena Dimitrova, soprano
- Dimitar Dimov, Bulgarian dramatist, novelist and veterinary surgeon
- Nikola Dishkov, Bulgarian entrepreneur
- Mykhailo Drahomanov, Ukrainian scholar.
- Nicola Ghiuselev, operatic bass
- Aleko Konstantinov
- Andrey Lyapchev
- Aleksandar Pavlov Malinov, Prime Minister of Bulgaria
- Lyubomir Miletich
- Gyorche Petrov
- Konstantin Muraviev, Prime Minister of Bulgaria
- Vanya Petkova, Bulgarian poet, writer and Guinness World Records candidate
- Vasil Radoslavov, Prime Minister of Bulgaria
- Boris Sarafov
- Petko Slaveykov
- Pencho Slaveykov
- Hristo Smirnenski
- Stefan Stambolov
- Petko Staynov
- Dimitar Talev
- Zhelyu Mitev Zhelev, 1st President of non-Communist Bulgaria
- Todor Zhivkov, Communist politician
- Wilfred Burchett Australian journalist
- A World War Two account of E. P. Thompson's brother 'Frank Thompson' who has a special memorial within the British war graves section of the cemetery (later discovered to have been executed and buried in Litakovo) can be found in 'There Is A Spirit In Europe (1947)' which was re-released in 2024.

== See also ==
- Category:Burials at Central Sofia Cemetery
