= Nikola Dishkov =

Bulgarian builder

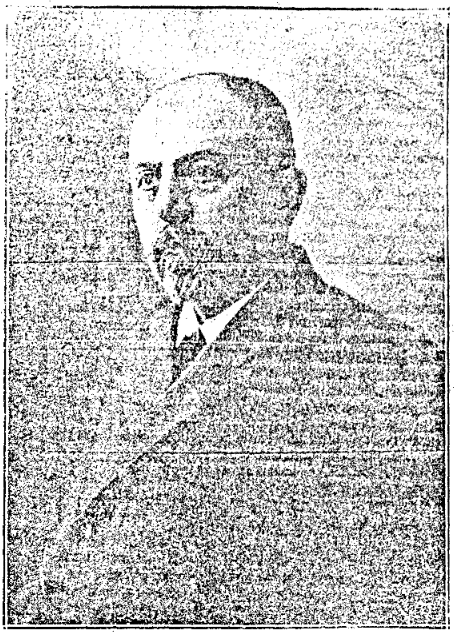
- Born: 13 December 1852
- Died: 2 April 1923 (aged 70)
- Resting place: Central Sofia Cemetery, Sofia, Bulgaria
- Occupation: entrepreneur

Nikola Dishkov was a Bulgarian builder and public figure, a member of the Macedonian emigration in Bulgaria.

== Biography ==
He was born on 13 December 1852 in Prilep He emigrated to Free Bulgaria with his family and settled in Sofia, where, after graduating from high school, he worked as a municipal official. At the outbreak of the Serbo-Bulgarian War in 1885, he volunteered for the Bulgarian Army.

After the war, he founded his own construction company, which dealt with building roads, bridges and railways. He participated in the construction of the Sofia-Radomir, Shumen-Kaspichan railway lines, as well as the St. Alexander Nevski Church.

Dishkov donated large sums of money to the Prilep Charitable Brotherhood and 200 000 leva for the construction of the Macedonian House in Sofia. In October 1920, at the Second Great Council, he was elected a member of the executive committee of the Union of Macedonian Brotherhoods, along with Dr. Ivan Karanjulov, Nikola Stoyanov, Hristo Stanishev, Naum Tomalevski, Dr. Bozhirad Tatarchev, Petar Glushkov, Yakov Yankov, Slaveiko Matov and Hristo Popov.

He died in 1923 in Sofia.
