= Omurtag Municipality =

Omurtag Municipality Община Омуртаг
- Municipality
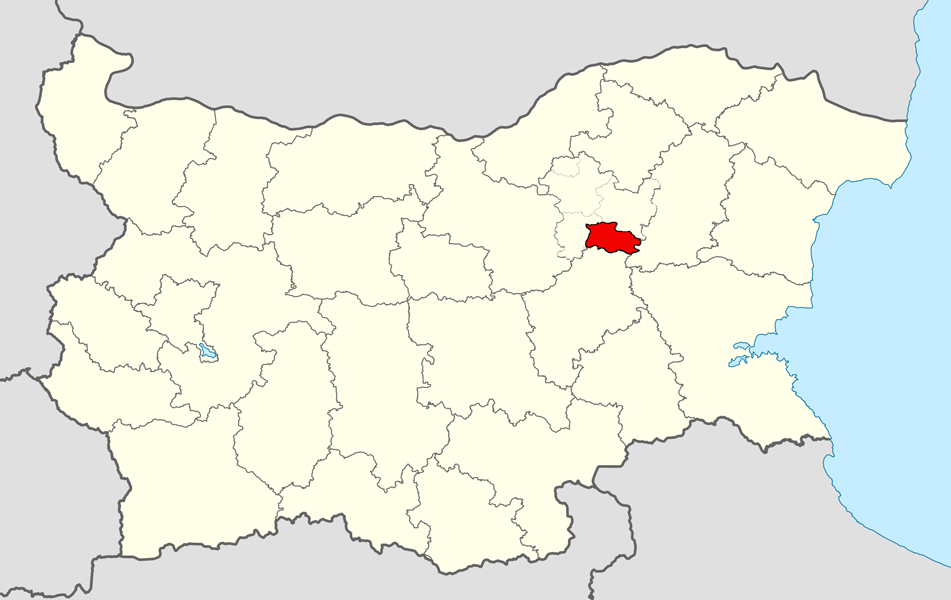
- Omurtag Municipality within Bulgaria and Targovishte Province.
- Coordinates: 43°5′N 26°27′E
- Country: Bulgaria
- Province (Oblast): Targovishte
- Admin. centre (Obshtinski tsentar): Omurtag

Area
  - Total: 401.7 km^{2} (155.1 sq mi)

Population (Census February 2011)
  - Total: 21,356
  - Density: 53.16/km^{2} (137.7/sq mi)
- Time zone: UTC+2 (EET)
  - Summer (DST): UTC+3 (EEST)

Omurtag Municipality (Bulgarian: Община Омуртаг) is a municipality (obshtina) in Targovishte Province, Northeastern Bulgaria, located in the so-called Fore-Balkan area north of the Stara planina mountain. It is named after its administrative centre - the town of Omurtag.

The municipality embraces a territory of 401.7 km^{2} (155.1 sq mi) with a total population of 21,356 inhabitants, as of February 2011. The main road E772 crosses the area connecting its main town with the province centre Targovishte, to the northeast, and the city of Veliko Tarnovo to the west.

== Settlements ==
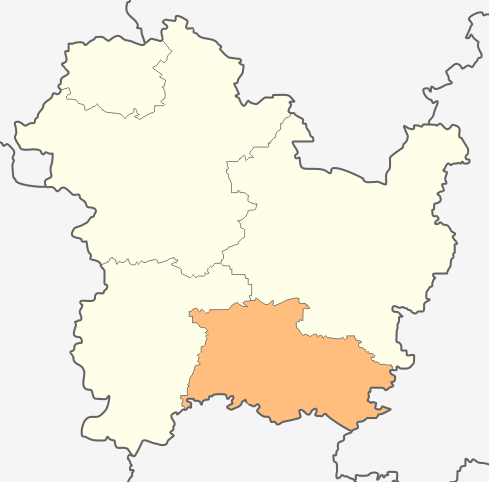
Omurtag Municipality within Targovishte Province

Omurtag Municipality includes the following 43 places (towns are shown in bold):

Town/Village	Cyrillic	Population (December 2009)
**Omurtag**	**Омуртаг**	8,725
Belomortsi	Беломорци	1,055
Balgaranovo	Българаново	219
Chernokaptsi	Чернокапци	315
Dolna Hubavka	Долна Хубавка	216
Dolno Kozarevo	Долно Козарево	439
Dolno Novkovo	Долно Новково	145
Golyamo Tsarkvishte	Голямо Църквище	364
Gorna Hubavka	Горна Хубавка	358
Gorno Kozarevo	Горно Козарево	262
Gorno Novkovo	Горно Новково	215
Gorsko Selo	Горско село	151
Iliyno	Илийно	621
Kamburovo	Камбурово	1,199
Kestenovo	Кестеново	308
Kozma Prezviter	Козма Презвитер	574
Krasnoseltsi	Красноселци	231
Mogilets	Могилец	377
Obitel	Обител	614
Panayot Hitovo	Панайот Хитово	320
Panichino	Паничино	181
Petrino	Петрино	152
Plastina	Плъстина	628
Ptichevo	Птичево	259
Padarino	Пъдарино	559
Parvan	Първан	347
Rositsa	Росица	11
Ratlina	Рътлина	235
Stanets	Станец	251
Tapchileshtovo	Тъпчилещово	107
Tsarevtsi	Царевци	62
Tserovishte	Церовище	645
Ugledno	Угледно	150
Velikdenche	Великденче	297
Velichka	Величка	500
Verentsi	Веренци	473
Veselets	Веселец	159
Visok	Висок	278
Vrani Kon	Врани кон	726
Zelena Morava	Зелена морава	593
Zmeyno	Змейно	179
Zvezditsa	Звездица	756
Total		24,256

== Demography ==
The following table shows the change of the population during the last four decades. Since 1992 Omurtag Municipality has comprised the former municipality of Obitel and the numbers in the table reflect this unification.

Omurtag Municipality
Year	1975	1985	1992	2001	2005	2007	2009	2011
Population	22,292	21,556	27,000	25,212	24,968	24,789	24,256	21,853
Sources: Census 2001, Census 2011, „pop-stat.mashke.org“,

=== Ethnic composition ===
According to the 2011 census, among those who answered the optional question on ethnic identification, the ethnic composition of the municipality was the following:

Ethnic group	Population	Percentage
Bulgarians	3518	20.1%
Turks	11959	68.3%
Roma (Gypsy)	1690	9.7%
Other	198	1.1%
Undeclared	147	0.8%

==== Demographic indicators ====
The municipality of Omurtag had relatively favourable demographic indicators compared to the Bulgarian average. But after 2013, the number of births decreased significantly while the number of deaths increased. Omurtag recorded its lowest birth rate, highest death rate and lowest natural growth in 2017. It was the biggest yearly fall since 2000.

	Population	Live births	Deaths	Natural growth	Birth rate (‰)	Death rate (‰)	Natural growth rate (‰)
2000	27,115	293	304	-11	10.8	11.2	-0.4
2001	25,240	263	276	-13	10.4	10.9	-0.5
2002	25,401	276	266	+10	10.9	10.5	+0.4
2003	25,298	308	311	-3	12.2	12.3	-0.1
2004	25,192	306	260	+46	12.1	10.3	+1.8
2005	24,968	238	310	-72	9.5	12.4	-2.9
2006	25,003	295	275	+20	11.8	11.0	+0.8
2007	24,789	312	338	-26	12.6	13.6	-1.0
2008	24,613	337	314	+23	13.7	12.8	+0.9
2009	24,256	323	286	+37	13.3	11.8	+1.5
2010	23,800	326	292	+34	13.7	12.3	+1.4
2011	21,818	328	285	+43	15.0	13.1	+2.0
2012	21,745	284	297	-13	13.1	13.7	-0.6
2013	21,614	252	252	+0	11.7	11.7	+0.0
2014	21,442	228	308	-80	10.6	14.4	-3.7
2015	21,442	255	321	-66	11.9	15.0	-3.1
2016	21,150	211	300	-89	10.0	14.2	-4.2
2017	20,853	176	332	-156	8.4	15.9	-7.5
2018	20,818	183	264	-81	8.8	12.7	-3.9

The continued childbirth decline came amid the falling number of women of childbearing age because of emigration to Western Europe (especially Germany and the Netherlands).

=== Religion ===
According to the latest Bulgarian census of 2011, the religious composition, among those who answered the optional question on religious identification, was the following:

Religious composition of Omurtag Municipality
Orthodox Christianity	18.5%
Catholicism	0.2%
Protestantism	0.0%
Islam	75.7%
No religion	1.9%
Prefer not to answer, others and indefinable	3.7%

== See also ==
- Provinces of Bulgaria
- Municipalities of Bulgaria
- List of cities and towns in Bulgaria
