= Joseph Al Ahmad =

Bulgarian actor, director (born 1996)

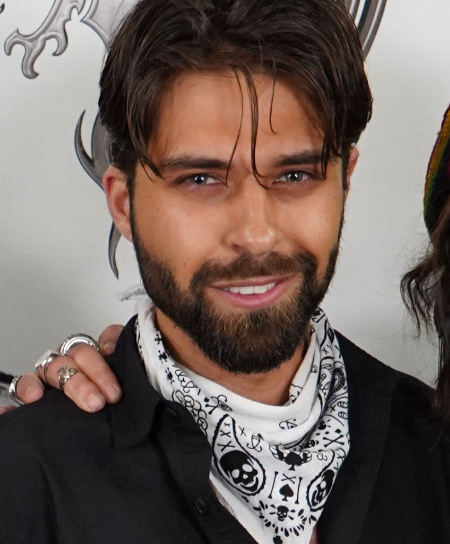
- Al Ahmad in 2023
- Born: Joseph Mohamed Al Ahmad; Sofia, Bulgaria
- Education: Gerasimov Institute of Cinematography
- Occupations: actor, director
- Years active: 2018–present
- Awards: Los Angeles Film Awards (2019)
- Website: josephalahmad.com

Joseph Al Ahmad is an actor and director of Bulgarian, Syrian, and Nubian-Sudanese descent. He is best known for his role as Bassam in the Egyptian-Hungarian TV show Above The Clouds, and for directing Motives.

== Biography ==
Joseph Al Ahmad was born on May 4, in Sofia, Bulgaria. His mother is a journalist of Bulgarian and Nubian-Sudanese descent, and his father is a professor from Syria.

Al Ahmad is the youngest grandson of poet and writer Vanya Petkova.

He majored in fine arts and later received his Master of Fine Arts degree in film studies and theatre from the Gerasimov Institute of Cinematography and Dramatic Arts in 2020, and resides in Los Angeles, California.

He is best known for his supporting-lead role as the prisoner Bassam in the Egyptian-Hungarian television series Above the Clouds (2018), while his acting debut was in 2015 with the feature film The Woman of My Life.

Al Ahmad's debut in the US film industry was in 2022, as the narrator of A Christmas Story Christmas during production.

As a director, he has made several films that received wide international recognition, most notably, his directorial debut Motives was awarded "Best Narrative Short" at the Los Angeles Film Awards in 2019, earning him the "Honorary Mention: Director" award from the latter as well, for which he was named "Rising talent at the main gates of the Industry" by European entertainment magazine EVA.
