= Omurtag (town) =

Omurtag (Osmanpazarı Turkish) Омуртаг
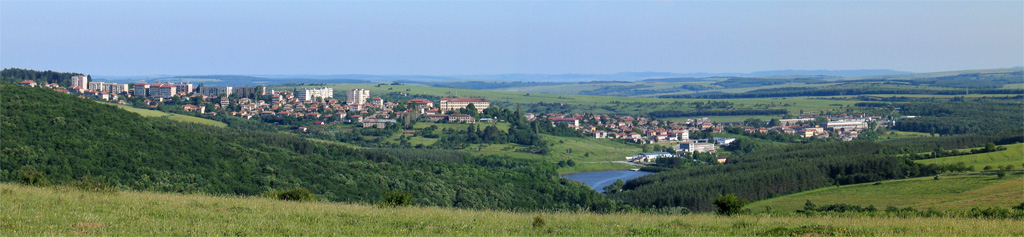
- View of Omurtag

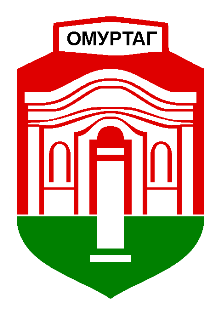
- Seal

- Location of Omurtag, Bulgaria
- Coordinates: 43°6′0″N 26°25′1.2″E
- Country: Bulgaria
- Province (Oblast): Targovishte
- Elevation: 525 m (1,722 ft)

Population (Census February 2011)
  - City: 7,369
  - Urban: 24,876
- Time zone: UTC+2 (EET)
  - Summer (DST): UTC+3 (EEST)
- Postal Code: 7900
- Area code: 0605

Omurtag (Bulgarian: Омуртаг [omurˈtak]) is a town at the eastern foot of Stara Planina in northeastern Bulgaria, part of Targovishte Province, situated at 525 m above sea level. It is the administrative centre of the homonymous Omurtag Municipality. As of February 2011, the town had a population of 7,369.

A notable natives are Aleksandar Aleksandrov, one of the two Bulgarian cosmonauts, and Viktor Yosifov, captain of the Bulgaria men's national volleyball team.

== History ==
The 1860 St Demetrius the Megalomartyr Bulgarian Orthodox church in Omurtag.

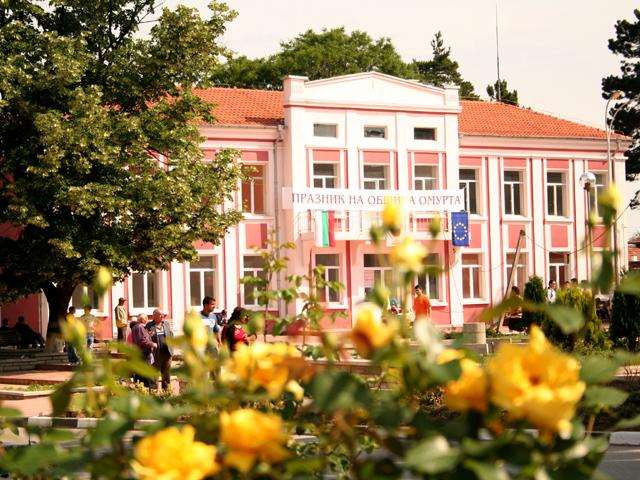
City hall

The area around the modern town has been inhabited since the Neolithic. Part of Justinian I's defensive system in the 6th century, the region gained importance as part of the First Bulgarian Empire due to the proximity to the capitals Pliska and Preslav and the passes of Stara Planina.

The first written evidence of the modern town dates from the 17th century, when it was mentioned as the kaza centre Osman Pazarı in Ottoman tax registers. The settlement was a centre of craftsmanship and trade.

Osman Pazarı was liberated from Ottoman rule on 27 January 1878 by Russian troops under Johann Casimir Ehrnrooth during the Russo-Turkish War of 1877–78. Most of the Turkish inhabitants of the town left and were replaced by Bulgarians from around Tran and Kyustendil.

Omurtag acquired its present name in 1934, named after the Bulgarian khan Omurtag.

On 24 February 2020 during strong winds knocked down the minaret of the 1874 mosque. The building itself survived with only minor damage to the roof, but the minaret was completely destroyed. As of 2021 the mosque is still under reconstruction.

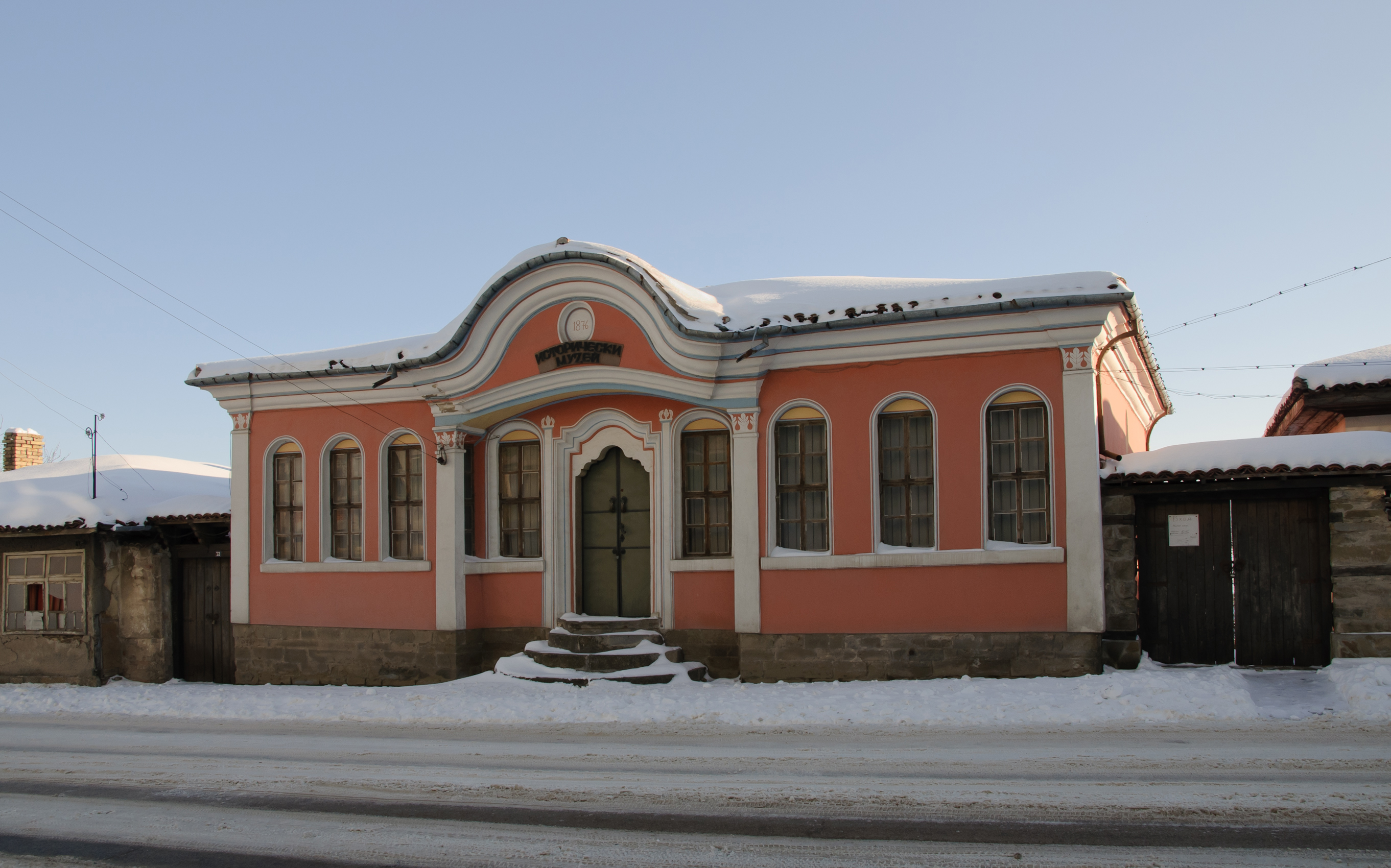
Historical Museum

== Population ==
Omurtag
| Year | 1887 | 1910 | 1934 | 1946 | 1956 | 1965 | 1975 | 1985 | 1992 | 2001 | 2005 | 2009 | 2011 | 2021 |
| Population | no data | no data | no data | 4,233 | 6,127 | 8,161 | 9,082 | 9,505 | 8,941 | 8,893 | 8,867 | 8,725 | 7,369 | ?? |
| | Highest number 10,160 in 1980 | | | | | | | | | | | | | |
Sources: National Statistical Institute, citypopulation.de, pop-stat.mashke.org, Bulgarian Academy of Sciences

== Culture ==
- Culture center "Father Paisii"

=== Education ===
- Primary School "Simeon Velchev"
- Primary School "Hristo Smirnenski"
- High School of Transport and Light Industry

== Sport ==
- FC Levski Omurtag

== Notable people ==
- Aleksandr Panayotov Aleksandrov – retired Bulgarian cosmonaut
- Daki Yordanov – Bulgarian botanist and university lecturer, academician of the Bulgarian Academy of Sciences.
- Dimitar Petkov – Bulgarian teacher, leading member of the Bulgarian People's Liberal Party
