= Elisaveta Bagryana =

Bulgarian poet

- Елисавета Багряна
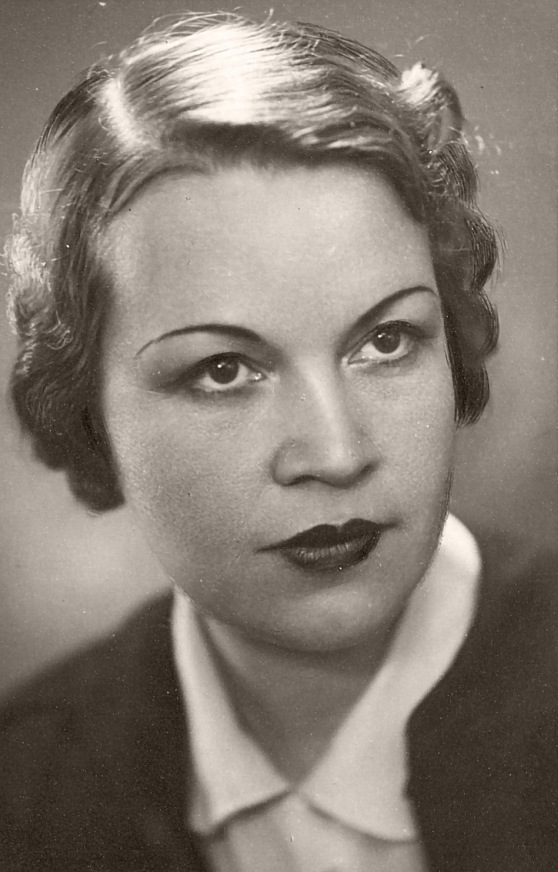
- Elisaveta Bagryana (fragment from a photo, made before 1939). Source: Bulgarian Archives State Agency
- Born: Elisaveta Lyubomirova Belcheva; 16 April 1893; Sofia, Principality of Bulgaria
- Died: 23 March 1991 (aged 97); Sofia, Bulgaria
- Resting place: Central Sofia Cemetery
- Occupations: Poet, Translator

Signature
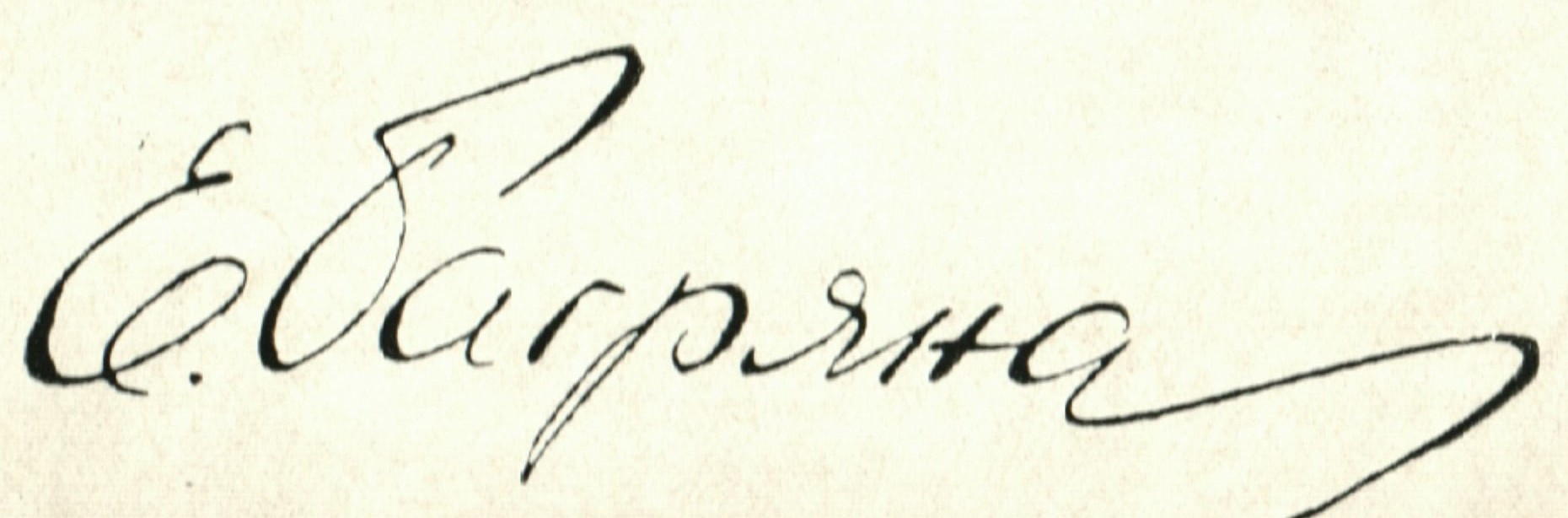

Elisaveta Bagryana (Bulgarian: Елисавета Багряна; 16 April 1893 – 23 March 1991), born Elisaveta Lyubomirova Belcheva (Bulgarian: Елисавета Любомирова Белчева), was a Bulgarian poet who wrote her first verses while living with her family in Veliko Tarnovo in 1907–08. She, along with Dora Gabe (1886–1983), is considered one of the "first ladies of Bulgarian women's literature". She was nominated for the Nobel Prize in Literature three times.

== Life ==
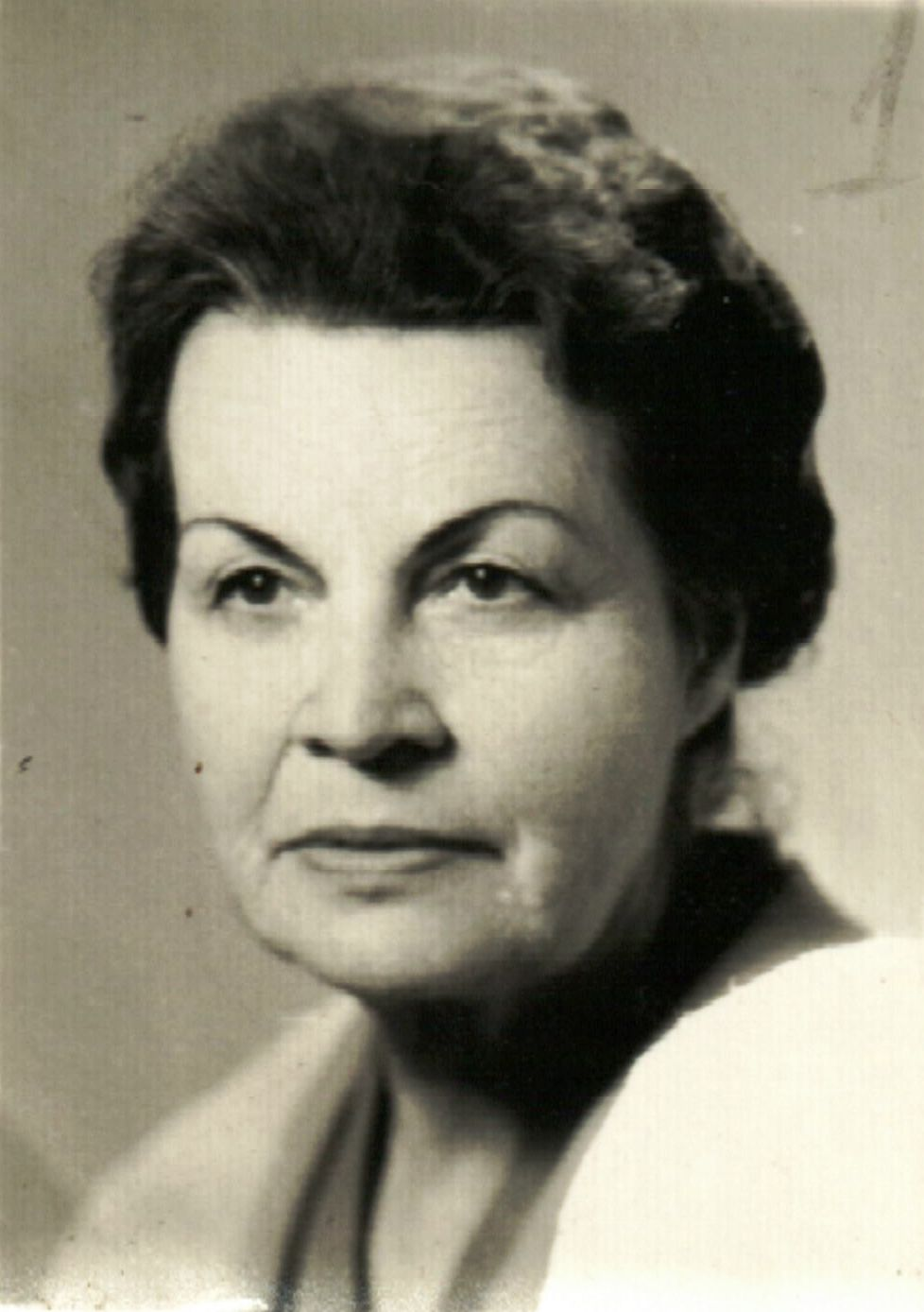
Elisaveta Bagryana. Source: Bulgarian Archives State Agency

Elisaveta Lyubomirova Belcheva was born on April 16, 1893, in Sofia, Bulgaria, in a clerk's family. She finished her primary and secondary education in the capital city. She lived a year (1907-08) with her family in the town of Tarnovo, where she wrote her first poems. Between 1910 and 1911 she taught in the village of Aftani, where she experienced rural life, after which she studied Slavic philology at Sofia University. Her first poems — Why (Защо) and Night Song (Вечерна песен) — were published in 1915 in the magazine Contemporary Thought (Съвременна мисъл).

It was after World War I ended that she truly entered into the literary world, at a time when poetry was undergoing a transformation. By 1921, she was already active in the literary life, and was collaborating on the Newspaper of the Woman (Вестник на жената) and the magazine Modernity (Съвременник), among other publications.

With the arrival of her first book, The Eternal and the Holy (Вечната и святата, 1927), she earned the confirmation of her peers. She also started writing children's stories. Her poems are straightforward, sensitive and serious, as in The Well (Кладенецът), a fable-like piece relating a well she dug when a little girl to the wellspring of poetry in her soul. They often are undeniably feminine – as in the poem The Eternal, in which the writer contemplates the body of a dead mother, or Evening Prayer – and spirited, as shown by the youthful, rebellious spirit in The Elements.

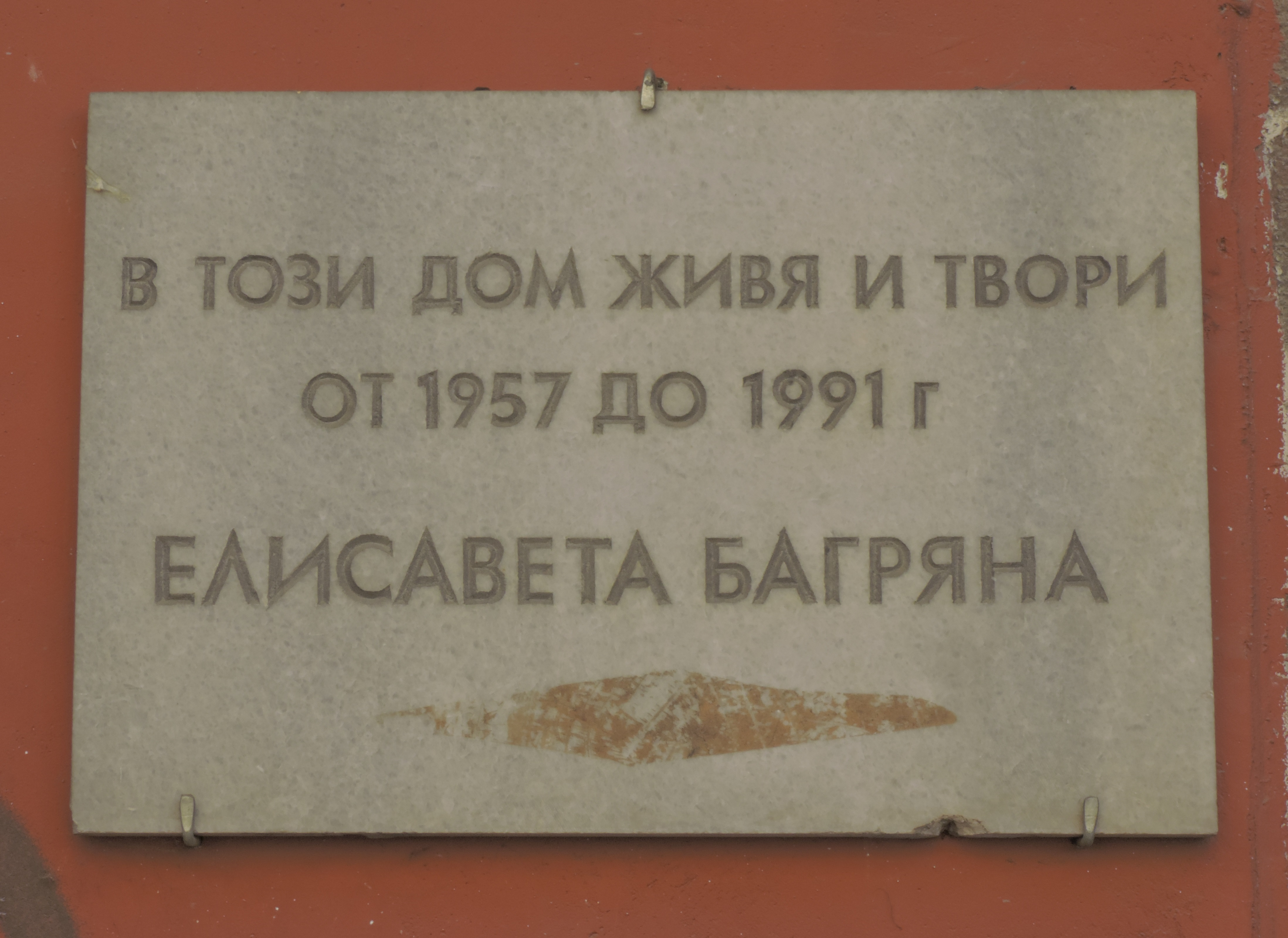
The memorial plaque on the house in Sofia, in which Bagriana lived and worked from 1957 to 1991

Bagryana passed her life surrounded by words, editing a number of magazines and writing. Her works have been translated into over 30 languages. Her poems are most recently available in a book entitled Penelope of the 21st Century: Selected poems of Elisaveta Bagryana, translated by Brenda Walker. She died in 1991, aged 97.

Bagryana was a friend of communist activist Pétar Russév, father of Brazilian politician Dilma Rousseff, who won election as Brazil's first female President on 31 October 2010.

== Works in English ==
- Elisaveta Bagriana (1970). Kevin Ireland; Piotr Dinekov; Piotr Velchev (eds.). Ten Poems, in the Original and in an English. Sofia Press.
- Penelope of the twentieth century: selected poems of Elisaveta Bagryana translators Brenda Walker, Belin Tonchev, Valentine Borrisov, Forest, 1993. ISBN 9781856100267
- Voices of Sibyls: Three Bulgarian Poets--Elisaveta Bagryana, Nevena Stefanova, Snezhina Slavova, Translator Yuri Vidov Karageorge, Morris Pub., 1996. ISBN 9781575021232

== Awards and honours ==
- In 1943, 1944, and 1945 she was nominated for a Nobel Prize in literature.
- In 1969, she won a gold medal from the National Association of Poets in Rome.
- Bagryana Point in Antarctica is named after Elisaveta Bagryana.

== See also ==
- List of Bulgarian-language poets
