= Stanka Pencheva =

Bulgarian writer (1929–2014)

Stanka Pencheva (Bulgarian: Станка Пенчева; July 9, 1929 – May 2014) was a Bulgarian writer.

She was born in Sliven and was educated there, going on to study Russian philology at Sofia University. She was an editor for Radio Sofia, for the Narodna Mladezh magazine and for the Septemvri magazine. Pencheva has been a correspondent for the newspaper Narodna Kultura.

Her poems have been translated into English, French, Spanish, German, Russian, Polish, Czech, Slovak, Romanian, Italian and Hindi.

== Selected works ==
- Пълнолетие (Coming of age) (1952)
- Опъната струна (Stretched cord) (1957)
- Кладенец на птиците (Well of birds) (1960)
- „Вселена (Universe) (1964)
- Земя на огньовете (Land of fires) (1965)
- Горчива билка (Bitter herb) (1966)
- Ябълковата градина (Apple orchard) (1967)
- Есенно сияние (Autumn lights) (1968)
- Пясъчна лилия (Sand lily) (1972)
- Планета за двама (Planet for two) (1977)
- Избрана лирика (Selected lyrics) (1979)
- Недовършен свят (Unfinished world) (1982)
- Разкопки (Excavations) (1984)

== Awards and recognition ==
Pencheva's awards include:

- 1974: Order of Cyril and Methodius of 1st degree
- 2003: Golden Chain award
- 2007: Ivan Nikolov Award in poetry

In 2012 the annual national literary competition "Stanka Pencheva" was established.
