= Yordan Eftimov =

Bulgarian poet and writer

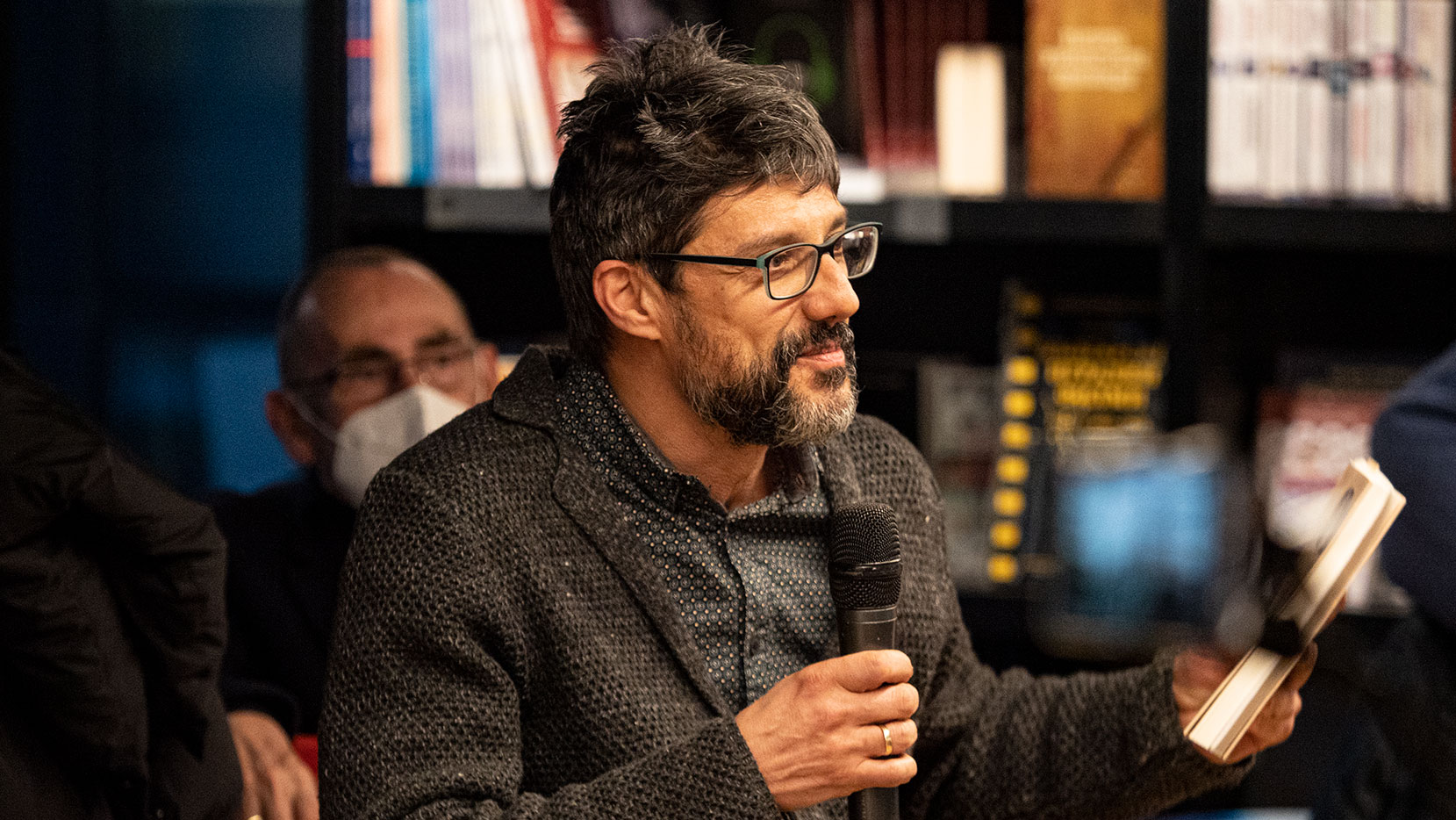
- Yordan Efftimov at premiere of “A book about modern Bulgarians” by Veselin Metodiev, NBU Book Center, January 20, 2022
- Born: Йордан Ефтимов; January 23, 1971 (age 55); Razgrad, Bulgaria
- Occupations: Writer, assistant professor at New Bulgarian University
- Writing career
- Literary movement: Postmodernism

Yordan Eftimov (Bulgarian: Йордан Ефтимов; born January 23, 1971, in Razgrad) is a poet, writer and literary critic based in Sofia, Bulgaria. He has eight poetry books awarded with national literary prizes. First of them, Metametaphysics (1993), won the National Debut Prize.

He finished the National Highschool for Classical Languages and Cultures in Sofia and later graduated in Bulgarian philology from the Sofia St. Kliment Ohridki University.

He is the author of many literary criticism articles in Bulgarian periodicals, among which the annual reviews of the Bulgarian Literature in the Demokrarticheski pregled (Democratic Review) magazine.

He is an Associate professor in theory of literature at the New Bulgarian University, Sofia. Among the subjects he teaches are BULB715 – The Bulgarian Modernism, and BULB602 – The Literature of the Balkans after the Balkan Wars and until Nowadays.

Since 1993, with some intervals, he has been the editor of the independent weekly issue for culture Literaturen Vestnik (Literary Newspaper). He is also the editor of the magazines Ezik i Literatura (Language and Literature) and Sledva (Next).

He is the author of the popular science book Modernism (2003). He is an active critic-observer of the paper market of Kapital newspaper (since November 2008), author and presenter of the Paper Tigers Programme on Radio France International (2001- 2005), of Studio Helikon in the programme Horizont (Horizon) on the Bulgarian National Radio (2005–2007) and of Zona za Chetene (Reading Zone) on Pro BG TV (since November 2009).

== National awards ==
- National Award Hristo G. Danov for Literary Criticism, 2006, winner;
- Ivan Nikolov National Award for Poetry, 2013, winner;
- Hristo Fotev National Award for Poetry, 2014, winner.

== Bibliography ==
=== Poetry ===
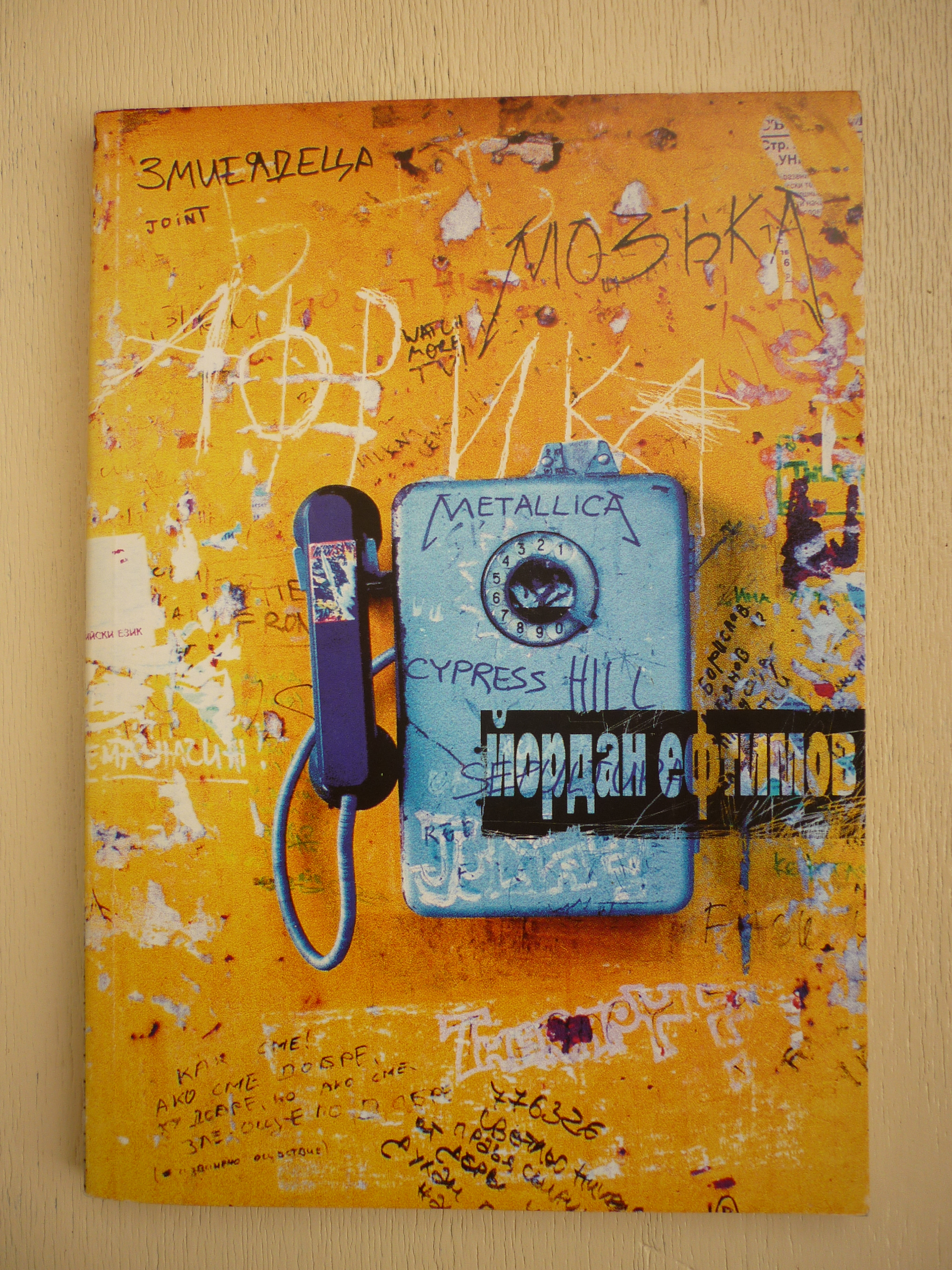
“Africa/Numbers”, first cover of the first Bulgarian edition, 1998

- Metametaphysics (Bulgarian: Метафизика на метафизиките). София: Свободно поетическо общество, 1993, 52 с.
- Bulgarian reader (Bulgarian: Българска христоматия). (в съавторство с Георги Господинов, Бойко Пенчев и Пламен Дойнов). София: Свободно поетическо общество, 1995
- Eleven Indian Tales (Bulgarian: Единадесет индиански приказки). София: Изд. ателие „Аб“, 1997, 36 с.
- Africa / Numbers (Bulgarian: Африка/Числа). Пловдив: изд. Жанет-45, 1998, 56 + 40 с. (ISBN 954-491-023-9)
- Bulgarian Anthology (Bulgarian: Българска антология). (в съавторство с Георги Господинов, Бойко Пенчев и Пламен Дойнов). София: Свободно поетическо общество, 1998. (ISBN 9548642808)
- Opera nigra (Bulgarian: Опера нигра). София: Анубис, 2001. (ISBN 9544263071)
- My wife always says (Bulgarian: Жена ми винаги казва). Пловдив: изд. Жанет-45, 2005, 96 с. (ISBN 954-491-25-09)
- The heart is not a creator (Bulgarian: Сърцето не е създател). София: Смол стейшънс прес, 2013, 60 с. (ISBN 978-954-384-014-4)
- Proven theories, final experiments (Bulgarian: Доказани теории, окончателни експерименти). София: Смол стейшънс прес, 2018.
- Before they wash off the blood (Bulgarian: Преди да измият кръвта). София: Лист, 2022.

=== Monographs ===
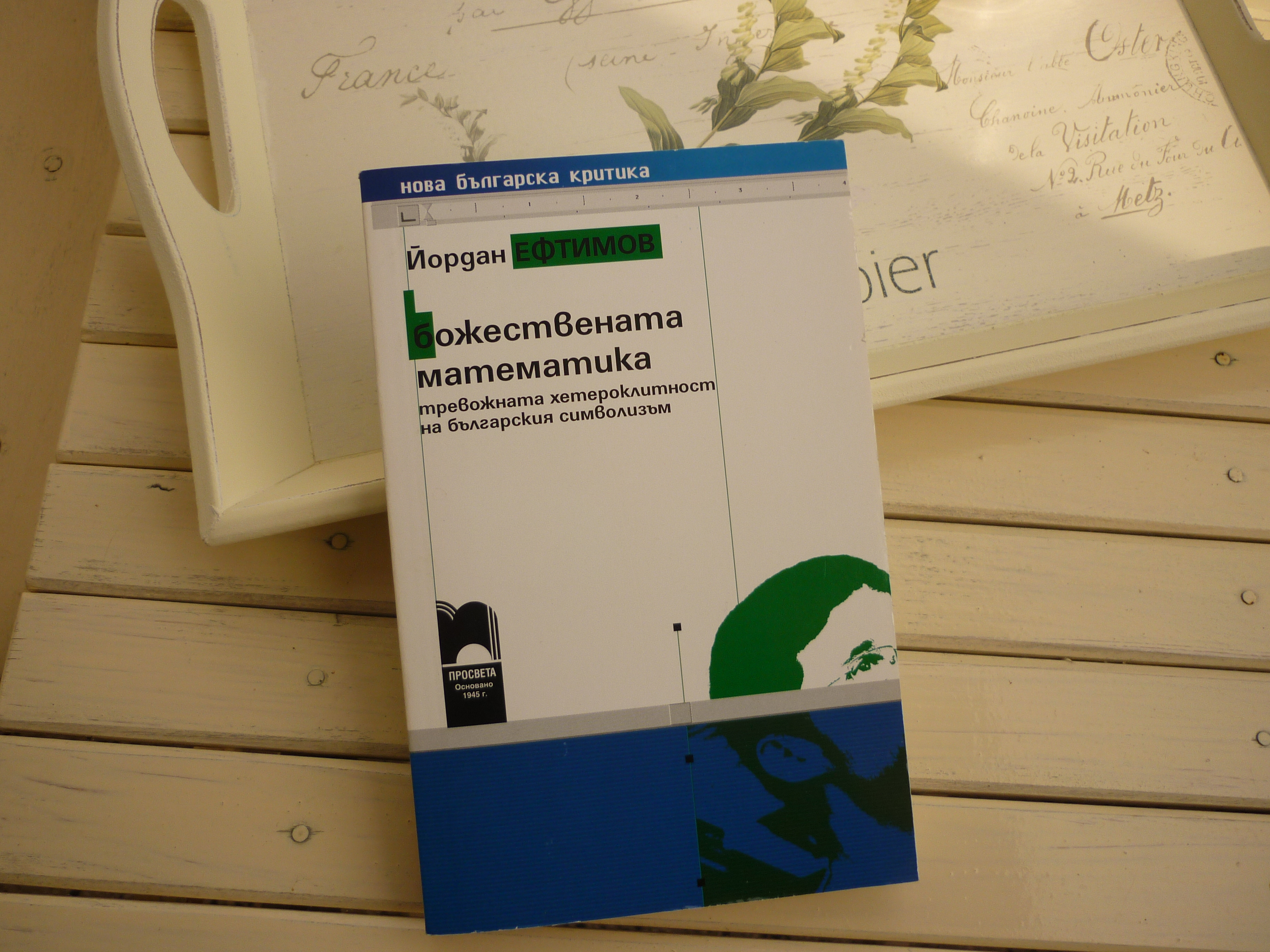
“Divine mathematics: Disturbing Heteroclicity of Bulgarian Literary Symbolism”, 2012

- The ill-fated virtue. Essays on Tsvetan Marangozov (Bulgarian: Опроверганата добродетел. Опити върху Цветан Марангозов). Изд. ателие „Аб“, С., 2008, 134 с. (ISBN 978-954-737-723-3)
- The Double Bottom of the Classics: From Botev and Vazov to Yovkov and Dalchev (Bulgarian: Двойното дъно на класиката: От Ботев и Вазов до Йовков и Далчев). Изд. „Хермес“, Пловдив, 2010, 183 с. (ISBN 9789542608868)
- Here lies the rabbit (Bulgarian: Тук лежи заекът). ИК „Сиела“, С., 2010, 204 с. (ISBN 9789542808442)
- Divine Mathematics: Bulgarian Symbolist Poetry (Bulgarian: Божествената математика: Тревожната хетероклитност на българския символизъм). София: Просвета, 2012, 336 с. (ISBN 978-954-012-699-9)
- Poetics of Agreement and Disagreement: Bulgarian Literature of 1950s – 1990s and Ideology (Bulgarian: Поетика на съгласието и несъгласието: Българската литература от 50-те до 90-те години на XX век и идеологията). София: Нов български университет, 2013, 318 с. (ISBN 978-954-535-726-8)
- Literature around zero. Fulfilled and unfulfilled projective analyzes and engaged forecasts (Bulgarian: Литература около нулата. Сбъднати и несбъднати проективни анализи и ангажирани прогнози). София: Просвета, 2019, 288 с. (ISBN 978-954-01-3980-7)
- Strategies without Tactics: Quarantinscapes and other micro-essays from Linkedin and from the mind's warehouse (Bulgarian: Стратегии без тактики: Карантинописи и други микроесета от Linkedin и от склада на ума). София: Смол стейшънс прес, 2021, 170 с. (ISBN 9789543841226)
