= Kardam =

Kardam may refer to:

== Religion ==
- Kardama, a character in Hindu mythology which is a sage

== People ==
- Kardam of Bulgaria (AD 735–803), ruler of Bulgaria
- Kardam, Prince of Turnovo (1962–2015), Bulgarian crown prince (eldest son of King Simeon II)
- Kanta Kardam, Indian politician

== Places ==
- Kardam, Dobrich Province, a village in north-eastern Bulgaria
- Kardam Buttress, a buttress in the South Shetland Islands, Antarctica
- Kardam, Targovishte Province
