= Slavyanovo, Targovishte Province =

Slavyanovo Славяново
- Village
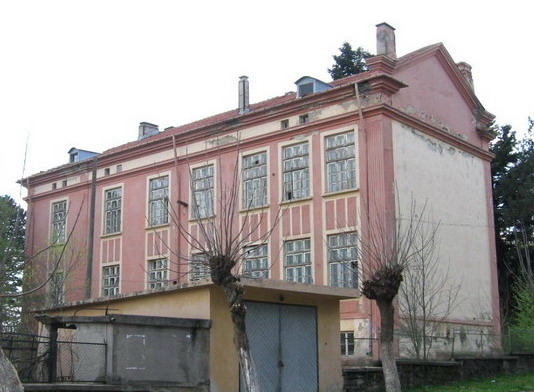

- Location of Slavyanovo
- Country: Bulgaria
- Provinces (Oblast): Targovishte Province

Government
  - Mayor: Vasil Stoilov (Green Bulgaria)

Area
  - Total: 26.862 km^{2} (10.371 sq mi)
- Elevation: 330 m (1,080 ft)

Population (2007-01-01)
  - Total: 894
  - Density: 33.3/km^{2} (86.2/sq mi)
- Time zone: UTC+2 (EET)
  - Summer (DST): UTC+3 (EEST)
- Postal Code: 7860

Slavyanovo (Bulgarian: Славяново) is a village in northeastern Bulgaria, in Popovo Municipality in the Targovishte Province.

== Geography ==
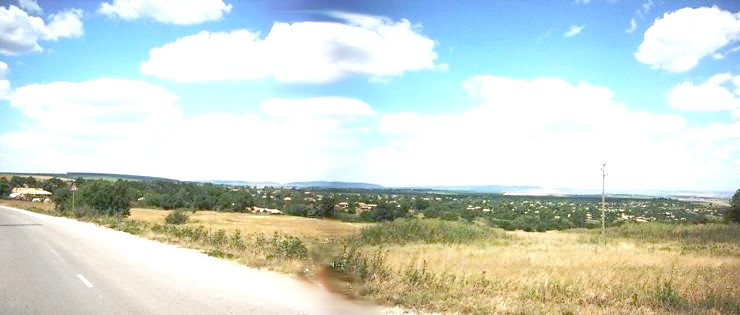
A view to the village.

Slavyanovo is situated in a flat region with a small inclination from the west to the east. There are four little rivers that flow through the village, three of them have their sources in the village. It is located at 11 km to the south-west of Popovo at an altitude of 330 m. There is a train station on the railway line Sofia-Varna and the main road between Popovo and Antonovo runs through the village. It borders with the lands of the villages Medovina, Baba Tonka and Posabina as well as the neighbourhood of Popovo, Seyachi.

The village consists of the following small neighbourhoods, called mahali: Sredna mahala, Krayna mahala, Bolnishka mahala, Bradishka mahala, Vladovska mahala, Cherkovna mahala, Kamburska mahala, Mihalevska mahala, Mutafska mahala, Noevska mahala, Papurska mahala, Srabska mahala, Stoynovska mahala, Tiholska mahala and Chukata.

== History ==
The village was first mentioned in Ottoman documents of 1524 and 1541 under the name Kara Agach as part of the nahiya Chernovi (Cherven). In a document of 1573 the name was slightly changed to Kara Agadzh. There used to be another village nearby which disappeared.

According to a legend the first house in the village was built under an elm (which in Ottoman Turkish was karaağaç) and hence its name. In 1894 the village was renamed to Borisovo with a decision of the municipal hall in honour of the birth of the future Tsar Boris III and after the communist regime took power in 1947 it was once again renamed to Slavyanovo.

Before the Liberation of Bulgaria the village was populated by Turks and had around 220–250 houses. The Turks used to breed goat and grow crops. In 1877 the village had 211 houses and 1,055 inhabitants. It had a school and a mosque which was burned during the Russo-Turkish War (1877-1878). After the advance of the Russian army in the summer of 1877 the local population fled to the village of Berkovski for a month and then went to the villages in the region of Shumen. After the fall of Pleven they returned to the village but soon started to settle down in Turkey. There were no battles in the area of the village although there were some Turkish forces in the vicinity and after the war the Russians sent troops to cope with the Turkish bands which took refuge in the forests around the village.

The first Bulgarians arrived in the village in 1882 from the village of Voditsa in the Teteven Balkan Mountains and in 1883 came people from 70 houses from the area of Tryavna, Elena and Strazhitsa. In 1898 there were 118 Bulgarian and 24 Turkish houses. The first Bulgarian school was opened in 1885 with the first teacher being Angel Gavrailov. The construction of the St John of Rila Church began in 1888 and was inaugurated in 1921, and the belfry was added in 1934.

== Public institutions ==
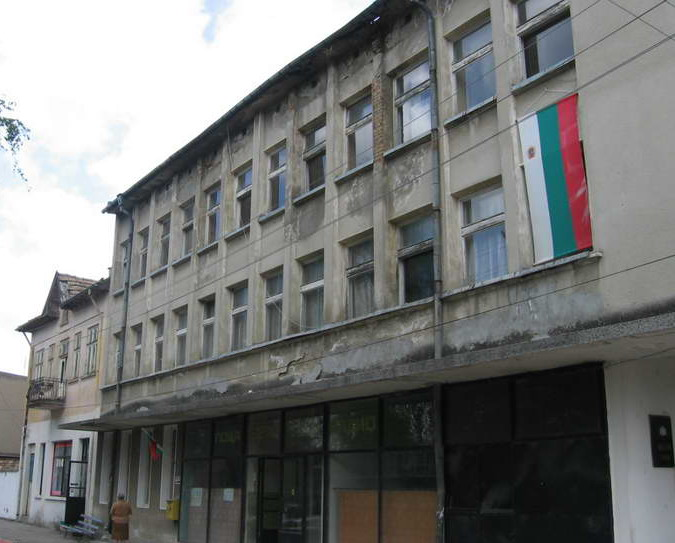
The town hall.

- Town Hall
- Vasil Levski Elementary School
- Chitalishte Lyuba Velich, established in 1905 as chitalishte Progress
- St John of Rila Church
- A mosque
- Kindergarten

== Cultural and natural landmarks ==
- The edifice of the "Climate School", constructed in 1925
- Baalak Tepe locality
- Klisedzhika locality with ruins of an old church 8 m long and 4 m wide. The walls were built only with stone and plaster. According to local legends were village was initially located there and was moved after a plague
- Yurtluka locality

== People ==
- Ljuba Welitsch (1913–1996) – opera singer
- Gancho Krastev – Minister of Agriculture and Foot Industry between 1973 and 1978
