= Elenovo (Targovishte Province) =

Elenovo Еленово
- Village
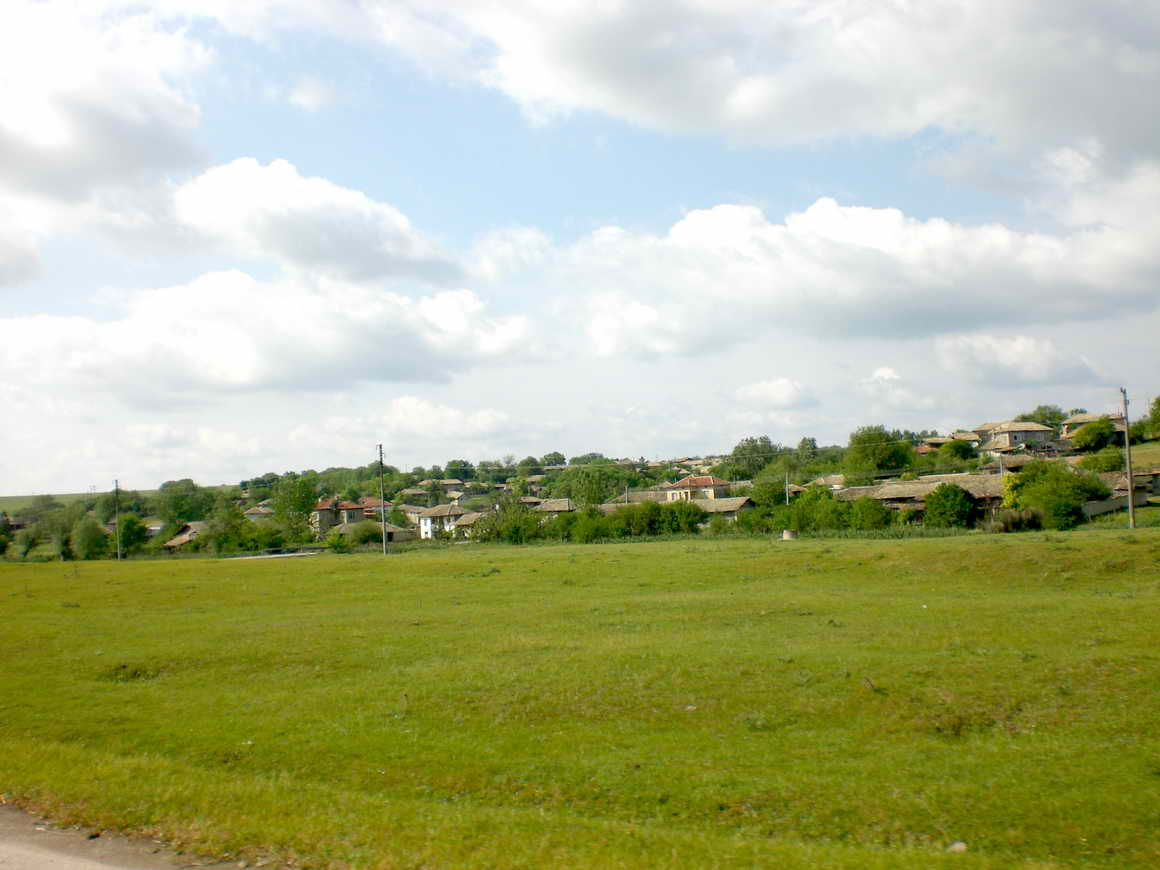
- Panoramic view of Elenovo

- Location in Bulgaria
- Coordinates: 43°24′42″N 26°23′59″E
- Country: Bulgaria
- Provinces (Oblast): Targovishte
- Municipalities (Obshtina): Popovo

Area
  - Total: 20.51 km^{2} (7.92 sq mi)
- Elevation: 200–299 m (656–981 ft)

Population (15 June 2012)
  - Total: 456
- Time zone: UTC+2 (EET)
  - Summer (DST): UTC+3 (EEST)
- Postal Code: 7837
- Area code: 060385

Elenovo (Bulgarian: Еленово, Elenovo; Turkish: Fülbeler) is a village in North-Eastern Bulgaria, in the Popovo Municipality, Targovishte Province.

== Geography ==
The village is mostly on a southern hillside roughly 18 kilometres (11 mi) north-east from the town of Popovo and 19 km (12 mi) south-east from the town of Razgrad, around 205 metres (673 ft) above sea level. A tributary to the Malski (Sadinski) Lom river runs through the village. The village borders with Trustika, Miladinovtsi, Makovo, Krushno, Drinovo and Lomtsi. It is connected by tarmac roads to Popovo, Drinovo, Razgrad, Trustika, Lomtsi, and by dirt roads to Makovo and Miladinovtsi. It comprises two neighbourhoods (mahala) divided by a hill.

== History ==
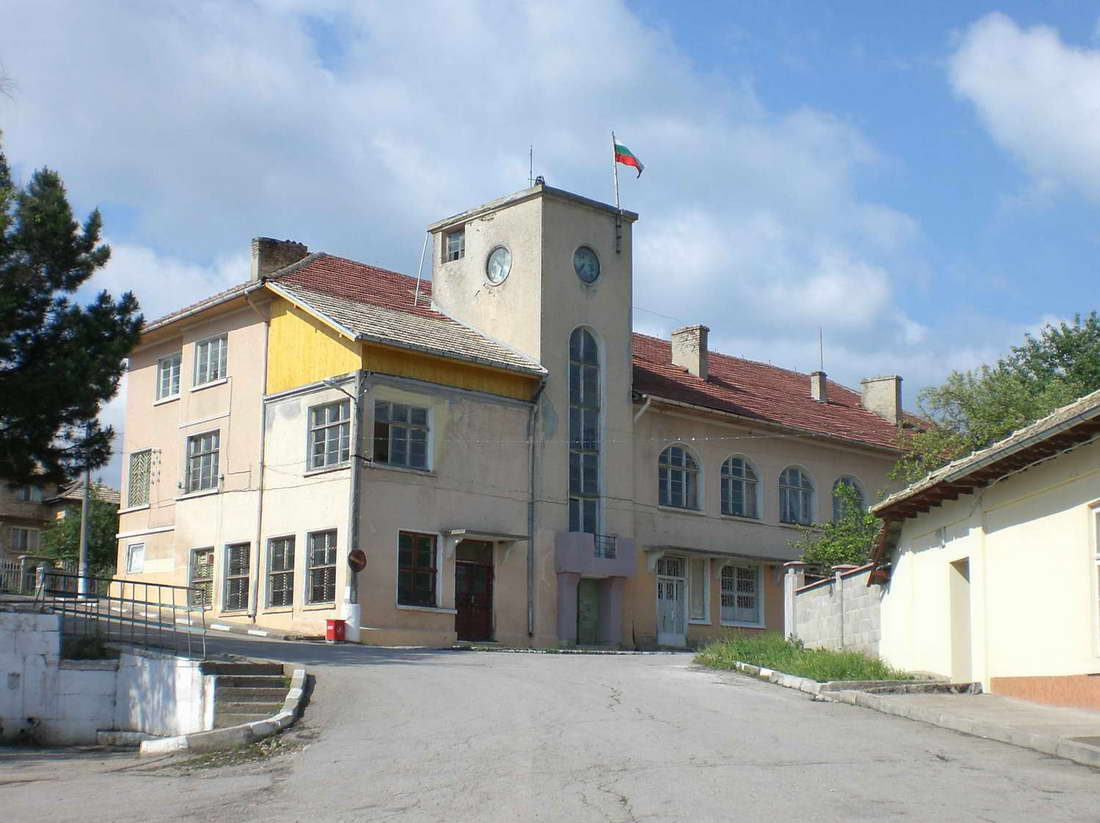
Mayor's office

The first mention of the old name of the village Filibeller is in an Ottoman tax document from 1524. Nearby was an even smaller village of the same name – Filibeller-i Küçük. The old village was situated in the area called Kuluka, where before 1883 were the remains of the old village mosque. According to oral tradition the founder of the village was an Ottoman from Plovdiv and the village was originally named for Filibe, the former name of Plovdiv. West of the present-day village, the remains of a settlement dating back to Ottoman times have been found.

Around 1573 the village was a part of Provadia. Around 1863 it consisted of roughly 50 Ottoman houses and a mosque and housed several offices for public and official use. In 1865, 5 houses owned by Tatars and 10 houses by Circassians appeared in the village. In the village, there was an Ottoman maktab, in which the children learned how to read by studying the Quran. In Elenovo immediately before the Liberation of Bulgaria, there were 120 Ottoman houses and only one owned by Bulgarians – the house of the blacksmith Stoyan Ivanov. In 1877, the first year of the Russo-Turkish War there were no battles around the village.

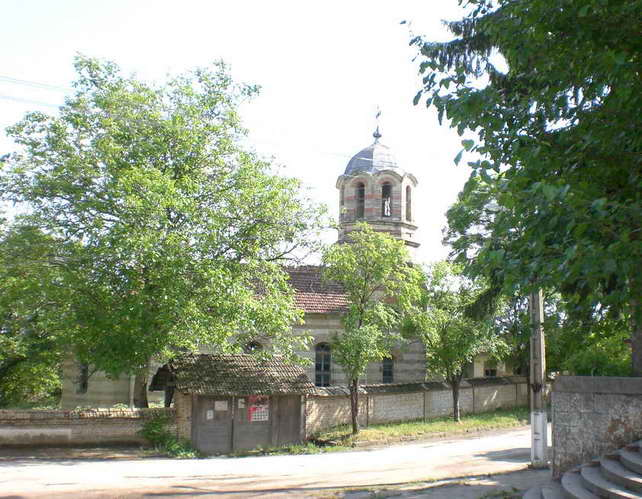
Church

The displacement of the Ottoman population and the appearance of Bulgarian settlers started around 1883–1885. All the settlers came from the area of Elenskia in the Balkan Mountains – from the villages of Bagalevtsi, Buinovtsi, Velkovtsi, Ganevtsi, Gradevtsi, Gushteri, Dobrevtsi, Drenta, Kirevtsi, Novachkini, Pashovtsi, Sultani, Toduvtsi, Hunevtsi, Usoi (Sheitani), Buinovtsi (Shoevtsi) and others. One family came from the village of Kopcheliite, Gabrovo Province. Close to the end of the year 1900, there were 553 Bulgarians and only 45 Ottomans in the village. The main income of the settlers came from farming, which before 1920 they practised seasonally in Russia, Austria, Romania and the former Yugoslavia.

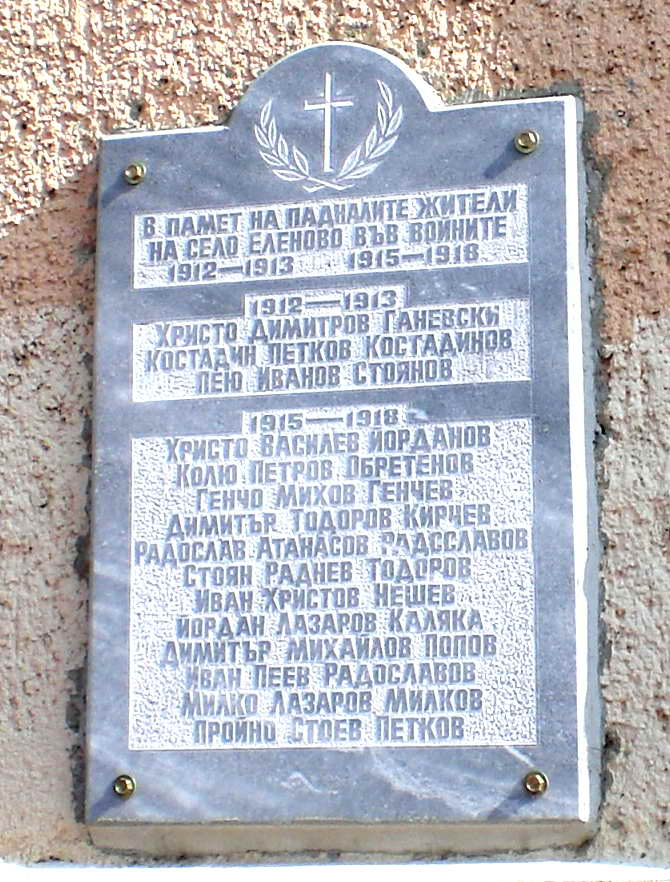
Memorial to the Deceased for National Unity in the wars of 1912–1913 and 1915–1918

During the wars for national unity (1912–1918) twelve men from the village died on the battlefields in battles with the then-enemies of the Kingdom of Bulgaria.

The first Bulgarian school in the village, which was later named for Saints Cyril and Methodius, was founded in 1886 and functioned as an elementary school until 2006. Initially the school also housed the Vuvedenie Presvetia Bogoroditsi chapel up until the village church was built in 1906–1907.

On 14 August 1934 the village was renamed from Fjulbeler (Фюлбелер) to Elenovo, in memory of the new settlers that came after the Liberation of Bulgaria from the area of the town of Elena.

The larger Bulgarian families were: Bagaliovchani, Bairamite, Bulcherite, Gradevite, Nikolchovtsi, Novachkinovtsi, Pashovtsi, Parmukliite, Tsigularite and others.

Today the inhabitants of the village are Bulgarians, Turks, Pomaks and Romani (Gypsies), and for a short period of time people from Bessarabia, although the latter have since left due to a lack of livelihood.

To the present day the main means of support for the people of the village is farming and raising cattle.

== Religions ==
- Christianity (Eastern-Orthodox);
- Islam;

== Public Institutions ==
- Mayor's office;
- People's Chitalishte „Postoianstvo";
- Church board of trustees;
- Mosque board of trustees;
- Day-care;

== Cultural and Natural monuments ==
- In the area of the village there are some partially preserved remains from ancient times – burial hills and a prehistoric hillside settlement in the area of Soudjak and others.
- In the near past in the area of the village there was one of the largest reservations nearby for large wild mammals with a hunting lodge, referred to by the locals as „the residence of Pencho Kubadinski", now owned and managed by DDS „Cherni Lom". Spanning 130,000 hectares (1,300 km^{2}; 320,000 acres) of which 26,000 ha (260 km^{2}; 64,000 acres) are forest areas it is considered an excellent place for hunting tourism.
- The church „St. Vuvedenie Bogorodichno", built from stone and bricks.
- Hunting grounds of DDS „Cherni Lom" in the town of Popovo for large Game (food) — deer and wild boar.

== Events ==
- Sobor of the village – carried out each year on 24 May.

== Literature ==
- Popov, A., N. Kunev. Popovo – The Town and its Area. A historical and geographical summary. Popovo, 1929.
- Dimitrova-Todorova, Liliana, The Local Names in Popovsko. С., 2006.
- Compilations „Popovo in the Past" (1–4)
