= The Man Between =

1953 film by Carol Reed

- Theatrical release poster
- Directed by: Carol Reed
- Screenplay by: Harry Kurnitz
- Story by: Eric Linklater
- Based on: Susanne in Berlin by Walter Ebert
- Produced by: Carol Reed
- Starring: James Mason; Claire Bloom; Hildegard Knef
- Cinematography: Desmond Dickinson
- Edited by: Bert Bates
- Music by: John Addison
- Color process: Black and white
- Production companies: London Films Productions; British Lion Films
- Distributed by: British Lion Films (UK); United Artists (US)
- Release date: 2 November 1953
- Running time: 102 minutes
- Country: United Kingdom
- Language: English
- Box office: £139,491 (UK)

The Man Between (also known as Berlin Story) is a 1953 British thriller film directed by Carol Reed and starring James Mason, Claire Bloom and Hildegard Knef. The screenplay concerns a British woman on a visit to post-war Berlin, who is caught up in an espionage ring smuggling secrets into and out of the Eastern Bloc.

== Plot ==
Susanne Mallison flies into Tempelhof Airport in post-war West Berlin, still open to East Berlin residents before the Berlin Wall is erected. She looks around the war-ravaged city with her sister-in-law Bettina, including the ruins of the Reichstag. After a night in a nightclub they plan to visit the eastern sector the next day. Entry is simple: they show their papers; a barrier lifts to give them entry. The atmosphere is different, with huge posters of Stalin and Walter Ulbricht decorating the buildings. There they bump into Ivo Kern in a cafe.

They return to the western sector. Susanne visits Martin, her brother (Bettina's husband), who is a British army doctor in the western sector. Susanne starts seeing Ivo. He confesses he'd been in love with Bettina. He arrives to collect her in a VW Beetle and they go skating. The sinister Halendar, Ivo's associate, appears almost each time they meet. Ivo tells Halender he wants to go to the west.

Halender wants to capture Kastner, a West Berliner, who is wanted by East Berlin Police because he helps East Berliners escape to West Berlin. Hallender agrees to let Ivo go to the West if Ivo helps capture Kastner. Ivo persuades Susanne to ask Martin to invite Kastner to a meeting with Ivo at their apartment. Bettina is appalled at the proposed meeting. Bettina confesses to Martin and Susanne that she was married to Ivo until 1943. When Ivo went missing in France, she had assumed he was dead. She says Ivo is a kidnapper for East Berlin authorities.

Ivo is a former lawyer who has participated in Nazi atrocities and is now selling his expertise to East Germans to kidnap and transport certain West Germans to the Eastern bloc. Although Ivo desires to relocate to the West, he is hampered by West German suspicions and his criminal past.

Martin and a friend plot to kidnap Ivo but he guesses this, and sends a boy to leave a sign in the snow that he is not coming. Susanne leaves the house, and is mistaken for Bettina and is bundled into a car. Ivo argues with Hallendar saying he has kidnapped the wrong woman.

The abduction of Susanne presents Ivo with an opportunity to both return the unfortunate victim to the West and impress Western authorities with his atonement. Ivo and Susanne narrowly avoid capture and wander through the ruins of East Berlin. They try to board a train at Friedrichstrasse but there are too many ID checks. They sabotage a generator to kill the lights to cross the wall at a large building site. The message boy (Horst) appears on the east side (it is not explained how he crosses the border).

As Ivo helps her to evade the East German authorities, Susanne falls in love with him. She tells him that she can see humanity deep inside a man who had once wished to defend the innocent and the 'rights of man'. This glimpse also appears to the young East Berlin boy who assists Ivo and Susanne in their attempt to escape, as he follows Ivo everywhere, and the boy is treated with kindness. Ivo almost admits his affection for Susanne on one occasion but he directs the conversation back to his sordid past and the escape attempt.

Ivo bribes a woman to let them hide in her flat for the night. They kiss for the first time and it is implied they sleep together. The boy comes to the flat with a laundry lorry driven by Kastner. They hide in the back as it drives to the crossing point, holding each other.

Just as the East German border guards are about the wave the truck through the gate, the engine stalls. Kastner gets it restarted, but not before drawing attention to the lorry. During his attempts to restart the engine, the capped boy circles on his bike a few metres from the checkpoint and has been noticed by one of the border guards; it is he who has unwittingly betrayed them by his presence. To distract the guards, Ivo jumps out of the back and is chased as he runs from the vehicle. As the truck crosses the neutral zone Ivo tries to reach the back and she reaches back for his hand, but he is gunned down by the guards, having sacrificed his life to help Susanne escape.

== Cast ==
- James Mason as Ivo Kern
- Claire Bloom as Susanne Mallison
- Hildegard Knef as Bettina
- Geoffrey Toone as Martin
- Aribert Wäscher as Halendar
- Ernst Schröder as Kastner
- Dieter Krause as Horst
- Hilde Sessak as Lizzi
- Karl John as Inspector Kleiber
- Ljuba Welitsch as Salome

== Production ==
The movie was filmed on location in Berlin, at the Shepperton Studios in England and at Richmond Ice Rink.

== Reception ==
James Mason won the best actor award from the National Board of Review.

Bosley Crowther of The New York Times wrote: "It must be said, without reflection, that the credit for whatever there is in the way of exciting melodrama in this primarily atmospheric film goes to Mr. Reed for his direction of the actors and camera. For it is the attitudes of his people, the moods of the city in various scenes and the cleverness of the assembly, rather than the sharpness of the story told, that account for the modest distinction on the quality level of The Man Between."
