= Kovachevsko kale =

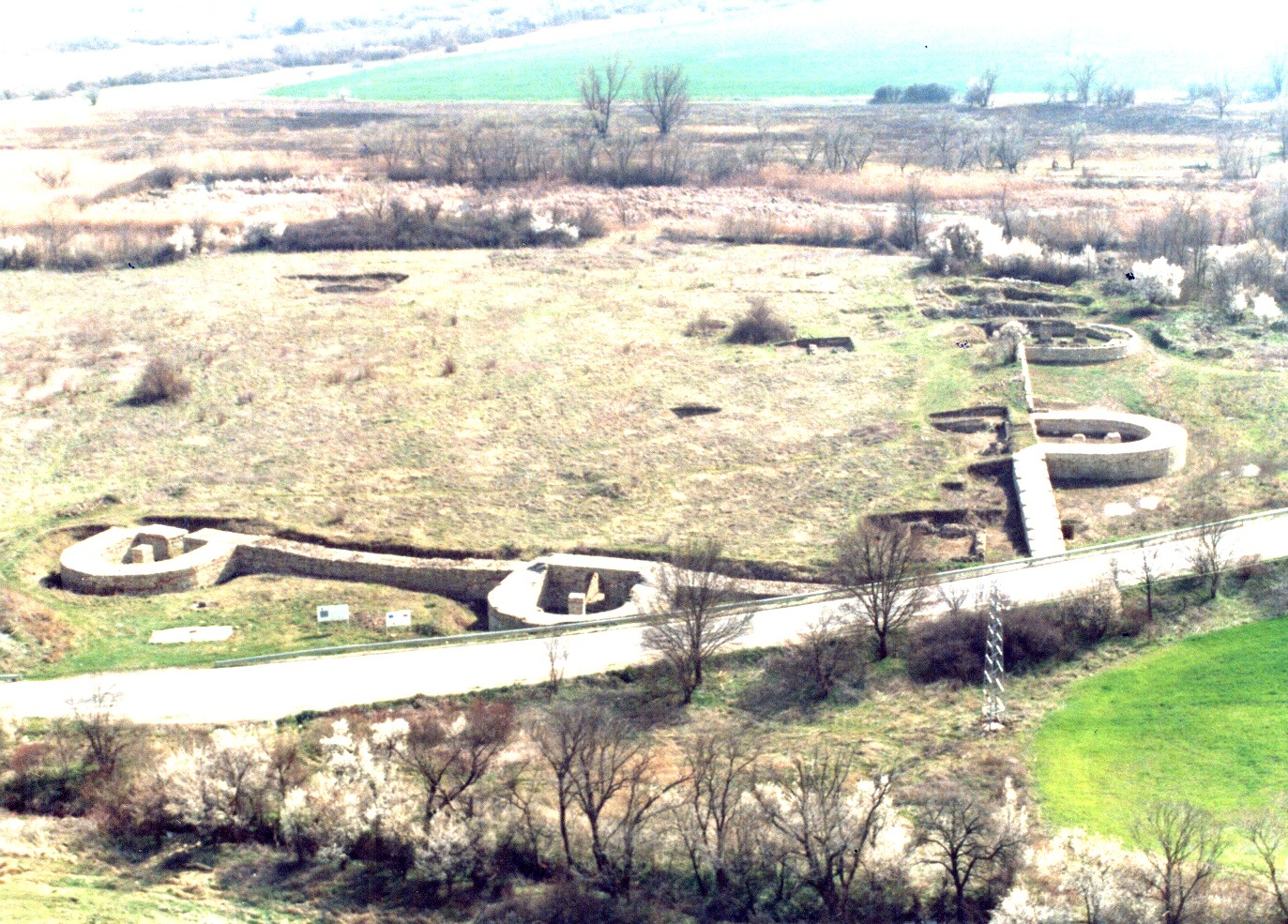
- Aerial photo of the fortress

- Location within Bulgaria
- 43°21′33.31″N 26°8′45.36″E
- Location: Kovachevets, near Popovo, Targovishte, Bulgaria

History
- Founded: early 4th century AD
- Built: Licinius or Constantine I
- Abandoned: late 6th century AD

Site notes
- Condition: Ruined

Gothic Invasions 250-251

Kovachevsko kale (Bulgarian: Ковачевско кале) was a Roman city which lies 6 kilometres (4 mi) west of the Bulgarian town of Popovo. The Czech archaeologist Karel Škorpil called it Kovachoveshko kale, after the name of the nearby village, Kovachevets (at that time Kovachovets).

It is notable for its massive defensive walls which have a roughly triangular plan and enclosed an area of more than 40 hectares (app. 10 acres). The stone walls are fortified with 17 U-shaped towers. There are two gates, one to the west and one to the northeast.

The city is located on a flat terrain, naturally protected by rivers.

The strong 3.20 m thick walls were built between 308 and 324 AD during the joint reign of Roman Emperors Constantine I the Great and Licinius after the Gothic Wars of 250-269. The city was set on fire in the Second Gothic War of 376-382 AD. It was slowly restored until the invasion of Attila the Hun around 447 AD. Finally it was destroyed by the Slavs and Avars in the 580s.

Recent excavations by Veliko Tarnovo University “St. Cyril and St. Methodius" have revealed a huge Roman building from the 4th century AD within the walls which appears to have been a horreum (i.e. a granary). It measured over 60m x 25m, though it has not been fully exposed. It had a massive double door of 2.4m width. The walls of the building are 1.3m wide reinforced with external buttresses. It had two stories and a basement and was constructed with opus mixtum. The granary was plundered and set on fire around 378 AD probably by the Goths.

An underground aqueduct built of clay pipes supplied the fortress with drinking water, descending from the northwest over several kilometres from Kalakoch hill.

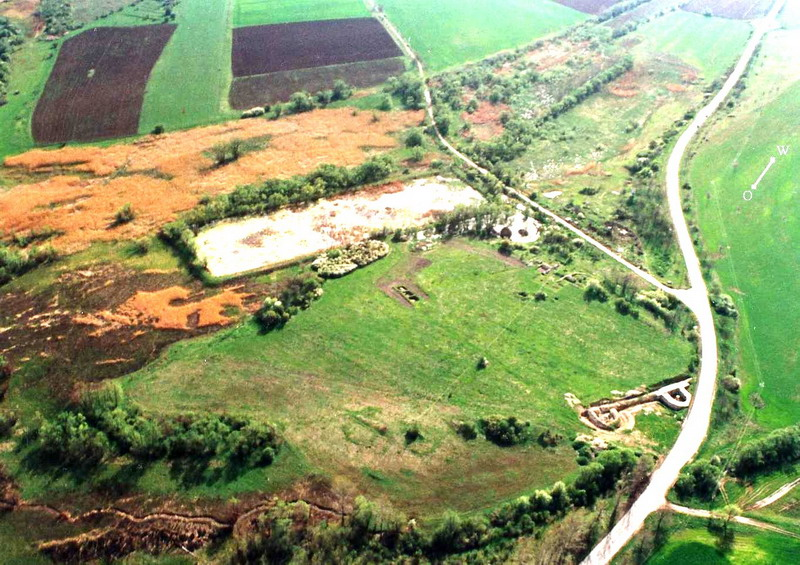

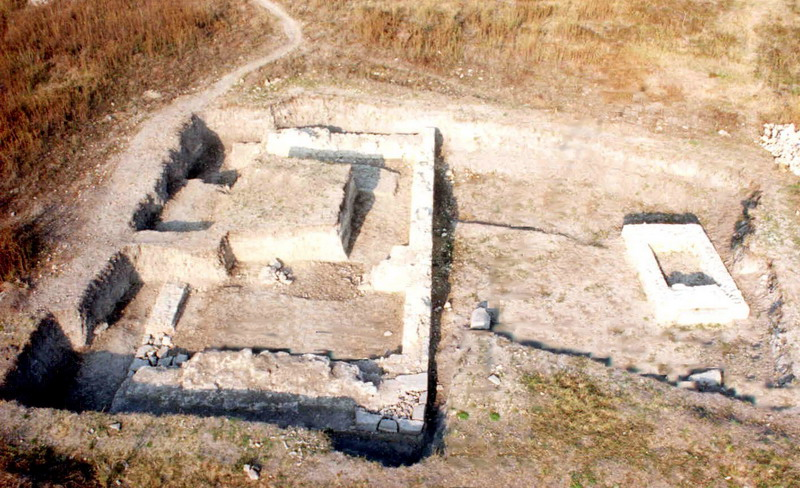

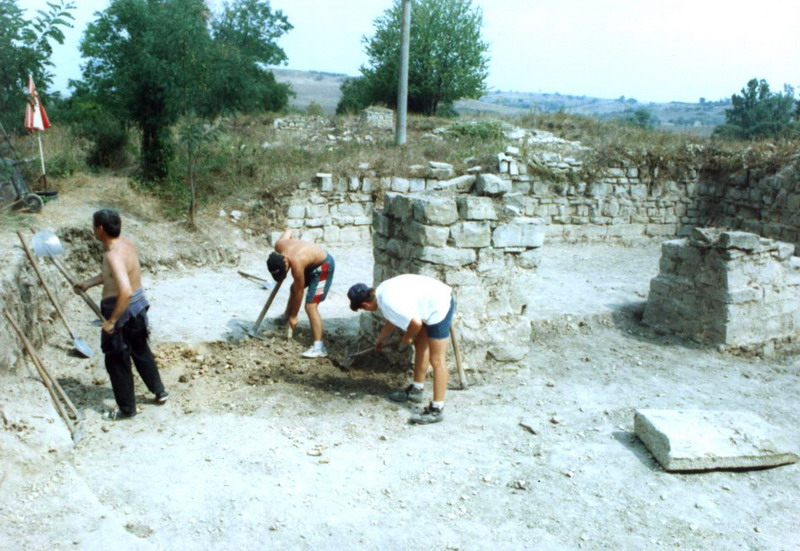

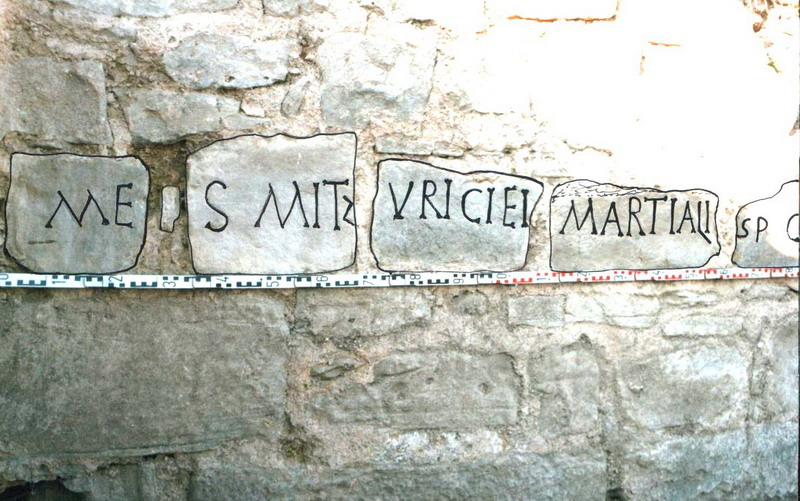
Undeciphered Latin inscription discovered outside the northern wall.
