= Ljuba Welitsch =

Austrian opera singer

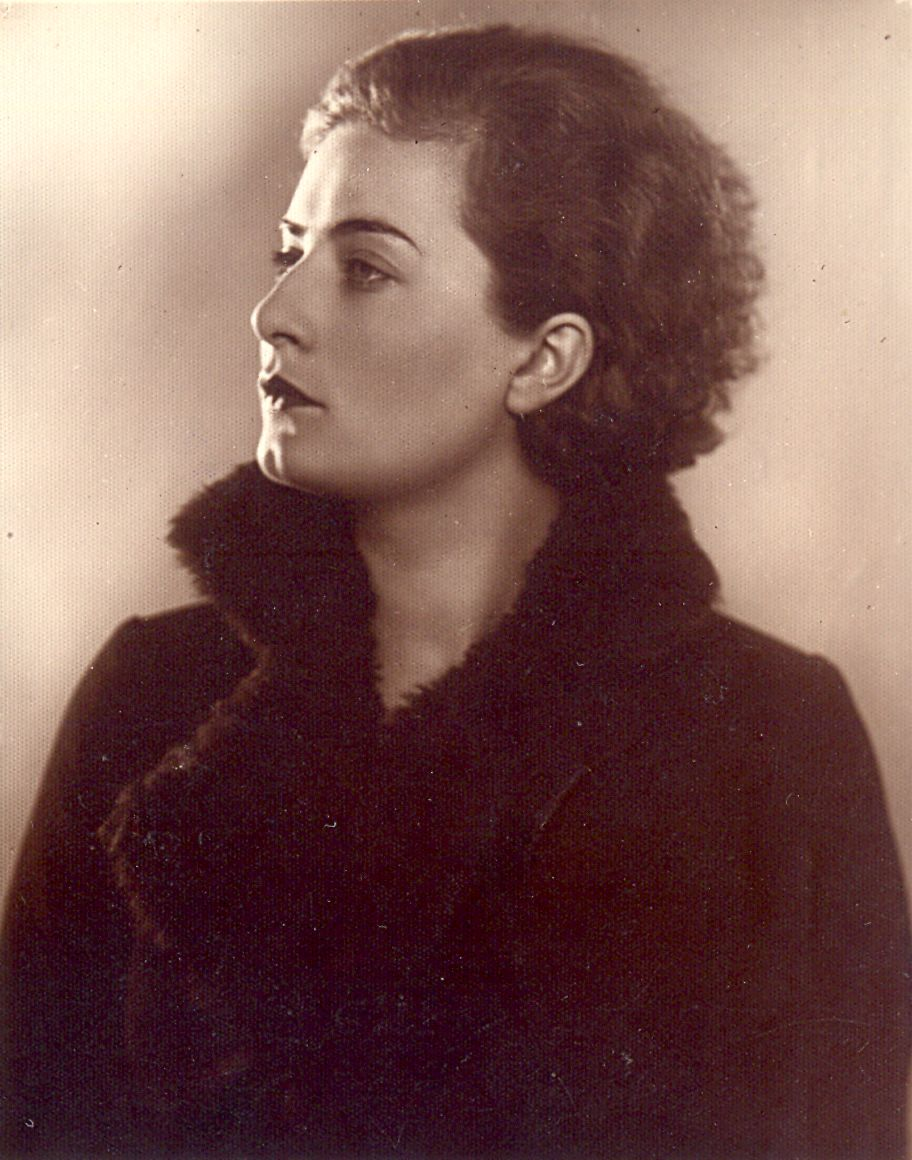
Welitsch, May 1934

Ljuba Welitsch (Veličkova; Bulgarian: Люба Величкова 10 July 1913 – 1 September 1996) was an operatic soprano. She was born in Borisovo, Bulgaria, studied in Sofia and Vienna, and sang in opera houses in Austria and Germany in the late 1930s and early and mid-1940s. In 1946 she became an Austrian citizen.

Welitsch became best known in the title role of Richard Strauss's Salome, in which she was coached by the composer. Her international career was short, its start delayed by the Second World War and its end hastened by vocal problems. It took off in 1947 in London and continued in New York from 1949, but her starring days were over by the mid-1950s. Her international career was just before the days when complete studio recordings of operas were common, and although some live recordings survive from broadcasts, her recorded legacy is not extensive.

From the mid-1950s, Welitsch sang character roles in operas and acted in stage plays. She died in Vienna at the age of 83.

== Life and career ==
=== Early years ===
Welitsch was born in Borissovo, Bulgaria, and grew up on her family's farm with her two sisters. Her interest in music began as a young girl; when she was eight one of her sisters gave her a violin, and for a while she considered becoming a professional player. After leaving high school in Shumen she read philosophy at Sofia University, gaining a PhD. In Sofia she sang in choirs, and studied music with Georgi Zlatev-Cherkin. With funding from the Bulgarian government she moved to Vienna to study with Theo Lierhammer, professor of singing at the State Academy.

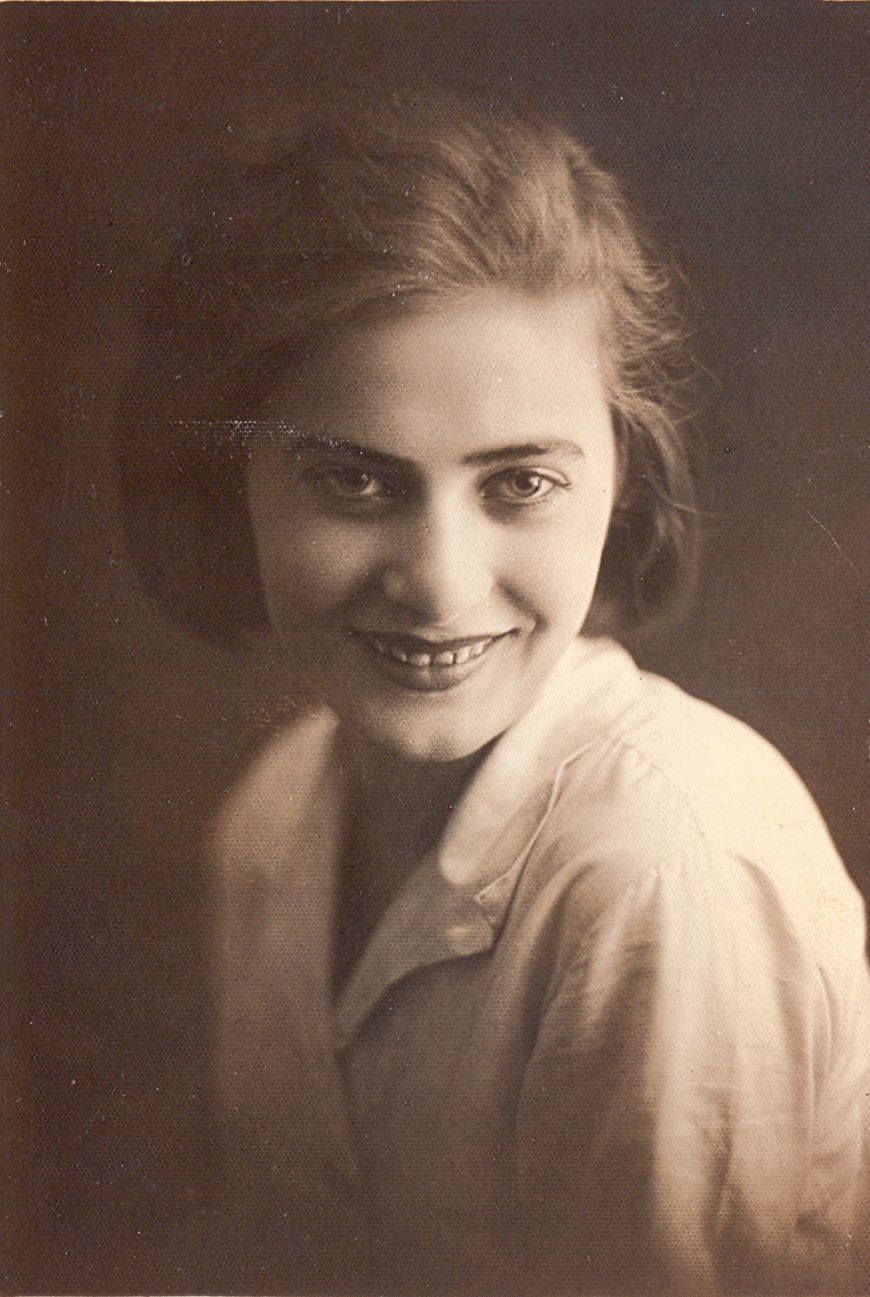
Welitsch in the early 1930s

Welitsch made her operatic debut in Sofia in 1936, in a small part in Louise. Her first major role was Nedda in Pagliacci at the Graz Opera in the same year. She learned her craft with the Graz company over the next three years, singing an unusually wide range of soprano roles, in operas by composers from Mozart to Wagner, Humperdinck, Puccini and Richard Strauss. (Note: Her roles at Graz included Mozart's Barbarina, Cherubino and Susanna (The Marriage of Figaro) and Fiordiligi (Così fan tutte); Wagner's Elisabeth (Tannhäuser) and one of the Valkyries (Die Walküre); Humperdinck's Hänsel (Hansel and Gretel) and Goose Girl (Königskinder); Puccini's Manon (Manon Lescaut); and Strauss's Sophie (Der Rosenkavalier))

Between then and the end of the Second World War she was a member of opera companies in Hamburg (1941–1943), Munich and Berlin (1943–1946). While in Berlin she played the role of the young Composer in Richard Strauss's Ariadne auf Naxos. Strauss saw her and was impressed; he arranged for her to sing the title role in a new production of his Salome at the Vienna Volksoper in 1944 to mark his eightieth birthday. He helped her prepare the part, and it became the one with which she was most closely associated. They worked on the piece for six weeks before the performance; Strauss attended rehearsals every day.

Welitsch took Austrian citizenship in 1946. She became a key member of the group of singers the opera manager Franz Salmhofer gathered around him as he strove to rebuild the Vienna State Opera company at the end of the war. In Vienna she further extended her repertoire, adding roles in French, German, Italian and Russian operas. As well as Salome, other roles with which she was particularly associated in Vienna were Cio-Cio-San in Madama Butterfly and Donna Anna in Don Giovanni. (Note: Among her other roles with the Vienna State Opera were the title roles in Aida, Giuditta and Jenůfa; and Lisa (The Queen of Spades); Desdemona (Otello); Giulietta (The Tales of Hoffmann); First Lady (The Magic Flute); Leonora (Il trovatore); Tatiana (Eugene Onegin); and Minnie (La fanciulla del West).)

=== International career ===
In 1947 Salmhofer took the company to London at the invitation of Covent Garden Opera. Welitsch was not completely unknown to British audiences, having been heard, and well-received, in performances of Beethoven's Ninth Symphony and Verdi's Requiem under John Barbirolli, but her reception in the opera house made headlines. At Covent Garden as Donna Anna and Salome she made a sensation, eclipsing her fellow company member Maria Cebotari, with whom she was sharing both roles. According to the Grove Dictionary of Music and Musicians she "dazzl[ed] London audiences with the passion, vocal purity and compelling force" of her performances. While in London, Welitsch took part in two broadcast performances of Strauss's Elektra, conducted by Sir Thomas Beecham in the presence of the composer.

David Webster, the director of the Royal Opera House, recognising Welitsch's talent, secured her services for the resident company, with whom she appeared between 1948 and 1953 in Aida, La bohème, Salome, Tosca and The Queen of Spades. In London, as in Vienna, operas were then customarily performed in the local language, and Welitsch, like other German singers performing at Covent Garden, had to learn her roles in English. As Musetta in La bohème, according to The Times, "she more often than not sang whoever was playing Mimì off the stage", although those Mimìs included Elisabeth Schwarzkopf and Victoria de los Angeles. When Welitsch sang Donna Anna for the Glyndebourne Festival Opera at the Edinburgh Festival in 1948, the critic Frank Howes wrote that she was a tiger who could have eaten both Don Giovanni and Don Ottavio "and still have called for more". In the same year she sang in Beethoven's Ninth Symphony with the Vienna Philharmonic conducted by Wilhelm Furtwängler at the Royal Albert Hall. In 1949 for Glyndebourne at Edinburgh she sang Amelia in Un ballo in maschera.

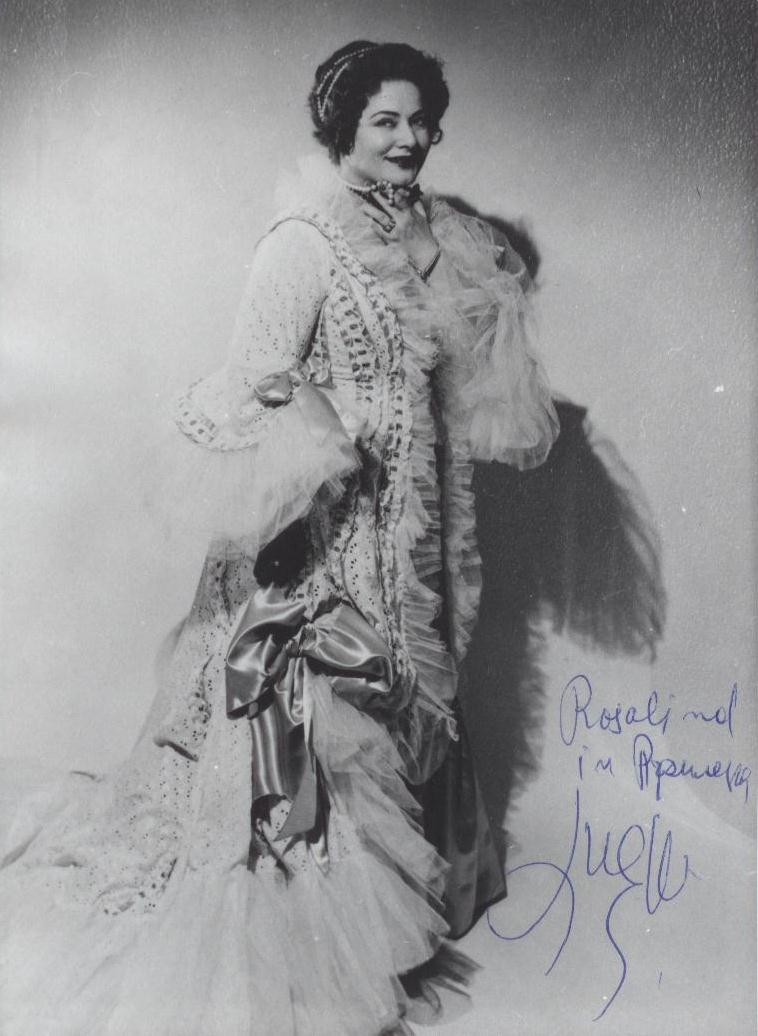
Welitsch as Rosalinde in Die Fledermaus

Also in 1949 Welitsch made her debut at the Metropolitan Opera, New York, in Salome; it was given in a double bill with Puccini's Gianni Schicchi, in which she did not appear. Comparing her with her predecessors as Salome, the critic Irving Kolodin wrote, "those who were better looking could not match Miss Welitsch's vocal performance, for euphony, clarity and meaning, and those who were comparable singers had no such physical identity with the role. Q.E.D. Miss Welitsch is the Metropolitan's Salome of record." Variety reported the praise of Welitsch's singing and acting, but concentrated more on her performance of Salome's dance of the seven veils: "Miss Welitsch really went to town, putting on a shimmy dance that makes 52nd Street swing coryphées look pale in comparison, and that had the Met audience gasping." The historian Kenneth Morgan writes:

This was truly one of the red-letter days in the history of the Metropolitan Opera, for the performance was greeted with a fifteen-minute standing ovation, which was almost unprecedented in the history of the company. Nothing like such applause had been heard at the Met for a generation, and the impact of this production was talked about for years afterwards.

At the Metropolitan Opera, Welitsch sang the roles with which she was associated in London, and added Rosalinde in Die Fledermaus. She returned to the house later in her career when she had switched to character roles, playing the non-singing character the Duchess of Crakentorp in La fille du régiment in 1972.

Welitsch's international career was mainly centred on Vienna, London and New York, although she remained loyal to Graz and made guest appearances there. She was twice invited to perform at La Scala, Milan, but her commitments were already too many to allow her to accept.

=== Later years ===
By 1953 Welitsch had developed nodules on her vocal cords, necessitating surgery. That, compounded by her unusually high number of performances, led to a swift deterioration in her singing, and she was obliged to give up the star roles for which she was most celebrated. She had expected a longer career, and had been contemplating taking on the role of Isolde in a few years' time, although she was not enamoured of Wagner in general. (Note: She firmly refused to contemplate Brünnhilde in The Ring, and when invited to sing Senta in Der fliegende Holländer, she exclaimed, "I am not a German peasant girl: I am a sexy Bulgarian!") The critic Tim Ashley writes that Welitsch's farewell to Salome came on film in Carol Reed's 1955 thriller The Man Between, in a scene set in the Berlin State Opera during a performance of the opera. "You only see her in long shot, though it's enough to get an idea of what she was like on stage."

Welitsch was still able to sing roles such as Magda in Puccini's La rondine in Vienna in 1955, and to record the character part of Marianne, the duenna, in Herbert von Karajan's 1956 set of Der Rosenkavalier. She successfully turned to the non-operatic stage, in parts such as June in a German translation of The Killing of Sister George in Berlin in 1970.

Long after her retirement Welitsch continued to be regarded by professionals with admiration and affection. The Decca producer John Culshaw wrote in 1967 that she was a welcome guest at recording sessions, and "one of our regular jobs is to bring kippers to Vienna for Welitsch". Her hospitality was famous, and she remained the focus of public attention even in retirement, as a member of first-night audiences.

Welitsch was twice married and twice divorced; she had no children. She died in Vienna after a series of strokes, aged 83.

== Critical assessment ==
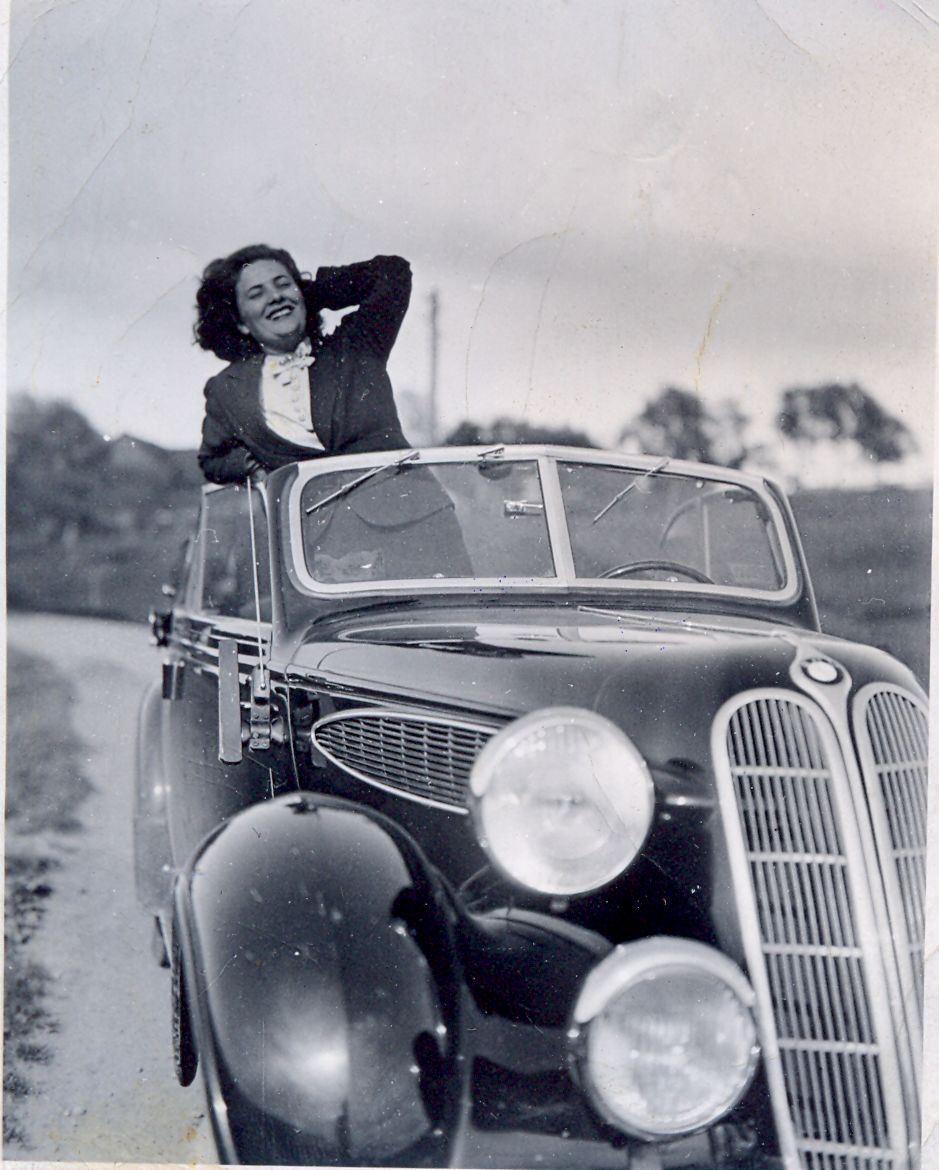
Welitsch in 1939

In 1953, writing while Welitsch's career was at its height, Lord Harewood, editor of Opera, said of her:

Her singing has a purity about it which one can only describe as instrumental – instrumental, that is to say, in the sense that the voice itself is absolutely even from bottom to top, and that the musical line appears to be quite indestructible and independent of such mundane considerations as the need to take in more breath."

Harewood's colleague Harold Rosenthal had earlier expressed strong doubt that recordings could do justice to Welitsch's powers. Rosenthal's comments were written in 1949, when Welitsch had made only a handful of recordings, but writing long after her retirement, J. B. Steane also felt that the various recordings available by then did not flatter her:

It is hard to think of a voice with a brighter shine to it, or of a singer with greater energy and more sense of joy in that sheer act of producing these glorious sounds. Even here, however, one notes that subtlety is hardly in question; there is little of the lithe seductiveness which Schwarzkopf and Güden bring to the [Fledermaus] Czardas, for instance. And this limits much of her best work, even the Salome in which she made such an exciting impression on her audiences.

Steane later added that a recently unearthed live recording from a broadcast of 1944 "shows the young voice at its finest, and conveys perhaps the most vivid impression of the temperament".

Irving Kolodin's unflattering judgment of Welitsch's beauty was not shared by other critics. Philip Hope-Wallace, in an article titled "The most beautiful woman I know", called her "incontrovertibly beautiful, if in a very individual way", and Ashley called her "20th-century opera's ultimate sex goddess ... but she was also one of the greatest singers who ever lived." After her dance of the seven veils in Salome the pin-up artist George Petty put her at the top of his list of "the world's best undressed women".

The soprano Leontyne Price said that it was seeing Welitsch in Salome that made an operatic career her own goal in life. In Oxford University Press's Dictionary of Opera Characters (2008), Joyce Bourne writes, "Among famous Salomes, e.g. Emmy Destinn, Maria Jeritza, Maria Cebotari, Christel Goltz, Birgit Nilsson, Josephine Barstow, Hildegard Behrens and Catherine Malfitano, probably the most famous was the Bulgarian soprano Ljuba Welitsch."

== Recordings ==
=== Complete operas ===
Welitsch's international career ended at about the time long-playing records were becoming the predominant medium for recordings. They opened the way for complete recordings of a large number of operas, but Welitsch retired too early to be part of this new development. Her only studio recording of a complete opera was Die Fledermaus (in English, without dialogue) recorded for the American Columbia label in December 1950 and January 1951 with the same cast and conductor as the contemporary Metropolitan Opera production.

There were plans to make a complete studio recording of Salome, with Fritz Reiner conducting, but they fell through for lack of funds. Complete live recordings of Welitsch in Salome were made in 1949 and 1952 and have been released in CD transfers. The critical consensus is that the first has Welitsch in better form, but with a weaker supporting cast than that of the 1952 set. Studio and off-air recordings of Welitsch in the final scene of Salome have been issued. The most widely circulated was a 1949 studio recording conducted by Reiner. The version mentioned by Steane, above, was recorded in Vienna in 1944 with Lovro von Matačić conducting.

Other off-air recordings of complete operas featuring Welitsch are Elektra (BBC, 1947), Un ballo in maschera (Glyndebourne company at Edinburgh, 1949), and Aida (Metropolitan, 1949 and 1950). A live recording of Don Giovanni was made at the Salzburg Festival in 1950, conducted by Furtwängler, with Tito Gobbi as Giovanni, Welitsch as Anna, Schwarzkopf as Elvira and Irmgard Seefried as Zerlina. It has been released on CD.

Welitsch sings Marianne in two complete recordings of Der Rosenkavalier. In addition to the Karajan set mentioned above, she plays the role in a 1957 Italian recording conducted by Artur Rodzinski.

=== Operatic excerpts ===
Early in 1946 the recording producer Walter Legge, talent-spotting in Vienna, signed Welitsch up as an EMI artist. For the EMI Columbia label she recorded arias including Tatiana's letter scene from Eugene Onegin, "Ritorna vincitor" from Aida, "Vissi d'arte" from Tosca, Musetta's Waltz from La bohème and "Wie nahte mir der Schlummer" from Der Freischütz.

With the Metropolitan orchestra under various conductors, Welitsch made studio recordings of two numbers from Don Giovanni in 1949, arias from Die Fledermaus, The Gypsy Baron and two numbers from Tosca in 1950. (Note: These numbers were "Perché chiuso? ... Mia gelosa" Tosca (act 1); "Vissi d'arte" Tosca (act 2); "Don Ottavio, son morta! ... Or sai, chi l'onore" Don Giovanni (act 1); "Crudele! Ah no, mio bene ... Non mi dir, bell'idol mio" Don Giovanni (act 2); "Czardás" Die Fledermaus and "Habet acht" (Gypsy Song) Der Zigeunerbaron.)

In June 1950 Welitsch, accompanied by the Vienna State Opera Orchestra, conducted by Rudolf Moralt, recorded for Decca eight arias by Lehár, Tchaikovsky, Verdi and Millöcker. The Verdi numbers were sung in Italian; the Tchaikovsky arias were given in German. (Note: The eight numbers were: Lehár Die lustige Witwe: "Vilja-Lied"; Lehár Zigeunerliebe: "Hör ich Cymbalklänge"; Tchaikovsky The Queen of Spades: "Ich muss" and "Es geht"; Verdi Un ballo in maschera: "Ma dall'arrido"; Millöcker Gräfin Dubarry: "Ich schenk' mein Herz"; Lehár Der Zarewitsch: "Einer wird kommen"; and Verdi Un ballo in maschera: "Morrò, ma prima".)

=== Songs ===
Some recordings of (mostly) German songs made by Welitsch in New York, accompanied at the piano by Paul Ulanowsky, were not released at the time, but have been published on CD. Some or all of them may have been intended as trial runs for future recordings. They include songs by Richard Strauss, Mahler's Rückert-Lieder and songs by Schubert, Schumann, Brahms, Alexander Dargomyzhsky and Joseph Marx. (Note: The Rückert-Lieder and Strauss's Vier letzte Lieder are in the original versions for piano accompaniment. In the former, "Um Mitternacht" is incomplete, and " Liebst du um Schönheit" is omitted. The two other Strauss songs are "Die Nacht" and "Cäcilie". The four Schubert songs are "Gretchen am Spinnrade", "Die junge Nonne", "Liebesbotschaft" and "Die Forelle". The Schumann songs are "Widmung", "Mondnacht" and "Der Nußbaum". The Brahms songs are "Die Mainacht", "Meine Liebe ist grün", "Vergebliches Ständchen", "He, Zigeuner; Hochgetürmte Rimaflut", "Lieber Gott, du weisst" and "Kommt dir manchmal in den Sinn". The other five songs are by Dargomizhsky – "Mne grustno" (I Grieve), "Mel'nik" (The Miller) and "Gde tï, zvezdochka?" (Where Art Thou, Little Star?); and Joseph Marx – "Hat dich die Liebe berührt" and "Valse de Chopin".)

== Filmography ==
Year	Title	Role	Notes
1953	The Man Between	Salome	
1958	Trees Are Blooming in Vienna	Singer	
1958	Arms and the Man	Katharina	
1959	Arena of Fear	Mama Allison	
1959	Liebe auf krummen Beinen	Trudchen	
1959	La Paloma	Bette Maier	
1959	Labyrinth	Ljubas	
1959	Du bist wunderbar	Yvonne Lehmann	
1959	My Niece Doesn't Do That	Opera Singer (Walküre)	
1960	Final Accord	Louise	
1961	Beloved Impostor	Ceila Shadwell, Syrup Millionairess	
1962	Aurora Marriage Bureau	Mrs. Pearl	
1962	Adorable Julia	Dolly de Fries	
1962	Das haben die Mädchen gern	Viktoria Petit-Pierre	
1963	Charley's Aunt	Baroness	
1964	I Learned It from Father	Manageress Neumann	
1967	The Sweet Sins of Sexy Susan	Old Woman	
1968	Paradies der flotten Sünder	Baroness	
1974	Eine Nacht in Venedig	Agricola	
1975	Ein echter Hausfrauenfreund	Hotel Manager	
1976	The Mimosa Wants to Blossom Too	Lady Shots	(final film role)

== Notes, references and sources ==
=== Sources ===
- Culshaw, John (1967). Ring Resounding. London: Secker & Warburg. ISBN 978-0-436-11800-5.
- Fellers, Frederick (2010). The Metropolitan Opera on Record. Ann Arbor, Michigan: Scarecrow Press. ISBN 978-1-4616-6417-8.
- Morgan, Kenneth (2010). Fritz Reiner, Maestro and Martinet. Baltimore: University of Illinois Press. ISBN 978-0-252-09194-0.
- Schwarzkopf, Elisabeth (1982). On and Off the Record: A Memoir of Walter Legge. London: Faber and Faber. ISBN 978-0-571-14912-4.
- Steane, John (1993). The Grand Tradition: Seventy Years of Singing on Record (2nd ed.). London: Duckworth. ISBN 978-0-7156-0661-2.
