= Svetlen, Targovishte Province =

Svetlen Светлен
- Village
- Location within Bulgaria
- Coordinates: 43.317°N 26.283°E
- Country: Bulgaria
- Province: Targovishte Province
- Municipality: Popovo

Government
  - Mayor: Yuri Iliev
- Elevation: 204 m (669 ft)

Population (December 31, 2025)
  - Total: 648
- Time zone: UTC+2 (EET)
  - Summer (DST): UTC+3 (EEST)

Svetlen is a village in Popovo Municipality, Targovishte Province, Bulgaria.
