= Popovo Municipality =

Popovo Municipality Община Попово
- Municipality
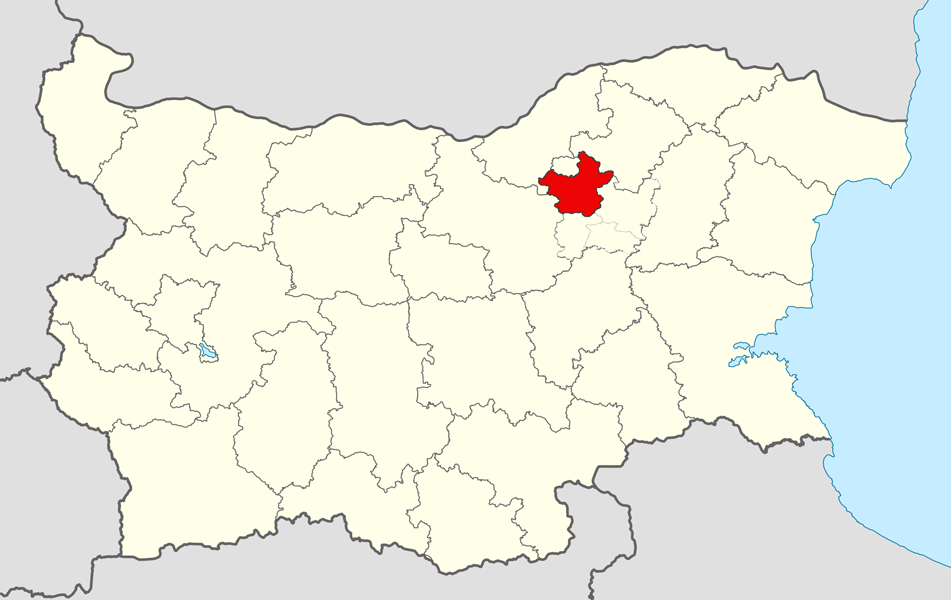
- Popovo Municipality within Bulgaria and Targovishte Province.
- Coordinates: 43°19′N 26°15′E
- Country: Bulgaria
- Province (Oblast): Targovishte
- Admin. centre (Obshtinski tsentar): Popovo

Area
  - Total: 833 km^{2} (322 sq mi)

Population (December 2009)
  - Total: 31,479
  - Density: 37.8/km^{2} (97.9/sq mi)
- Time zone: UTC+2 (EET)
  - Summer (DST): UTC+3 (EEST)

Popovo Municipality (Bulgarian: Община Попово) is a municipality (obshtina) in Targovishte Province, Northeastern Bulgaria, located in the eastern part of the Danubian Plain. It is named after its administrative centre - the town of Popovo.

The municipality embraces a territory of 833 km^{2} (322 sq mi) with a population of 31,479 inhabitants, as of December 2009. The Hemus motorway is planned to cross the southern part of the area.

== Settlements ==
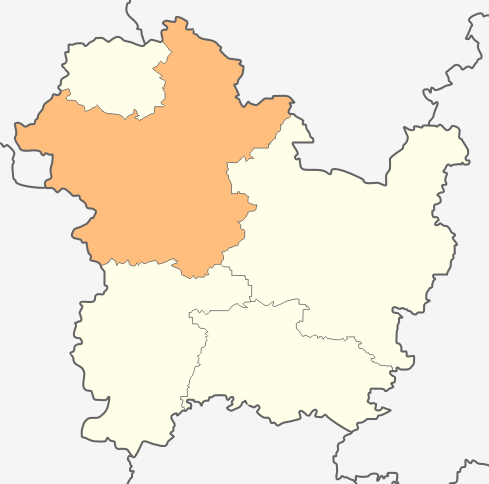
Popovo Municipality within Targovishte Province

Popovo Municipality includes the following 34 places (towns are shown in bold):

Town/Village	Cyrillic	Population (December 2009)
**Popovo**	**Попово**	15,548
Aprilovo	Априлово	614
Baba Tonka	Баба Тонка	111
Berkovski	Берковски	108
Braknitsa	Бракница	79
Dolets	Долец	90
Dolna Kabda	Долна Кабда	243
Drinovo	Дриново	541
Elenovo	Еленово	481
Gagovo	Гагово	812
Gloginka	Глогинка	553
Goritsa	Горица	164
Ivancha	Иванча	29
Konak	Конак	93
Kozitsa	Козица	337
Kardam	Кардам	1,491
Kovachevets	Ковачевец	691
Lomtsi	Ломци	1,052
Marchino	Марчино	124
Medovina	Медовина	878
Manastiritsa	Манастирица	39
Osikovo	Осиково	205
Palamartsa	Паламарца	634
Posabina	Посабина	250
Pomoshtitsa	Помощица	120
Sadina	Садина	1,117
Slavyanovo	Славяново	861
Svetlen	Светлен	1,208
Trastika	Тръстика	311
Voditsa	Водица	796
Zavetno	Заветно	114
Zaraevo	Зараево	981
Zvezda	Звезда	204
Zahari Stoyanovo	Захари Стояново	374
Total		31,479

== Demography ==
The following table shows the change of the population during the last four decades. Since 1992 Popovo Municipality has comprised the former municipalities of Sadina and Voditsa and the numbers in the table reflect this unification.

Popovo Municipality
Year	1975	1985	1992	2001	2005	2007	2009	2011
Population	35,802	33,252	40,968	36,208	33,558	32,559	31,479	28,775
Sources: Census 2001, Census 2011, „pop-stat.mashke.org“,

=== Ethnic composition ===
According to the 2011 census, among those who answered the optional question on ethnic identification, the ethnic composition of the municipality was the following:

Ethnic group	Population	Percentage
Bulgarians	18531	74.6%
Turks	4556	18.3%
Roma (Gypsy)	959	3.9%
Other	155	0.6%
Undeclared	631	2.5%

==== Religion ====
According to the latest Bulgarian census of 2011, the religious composition, among those who answered the optional question on religious identification, was the following:

Religious composition of Popovo Municipality
Orthodox Christianity	68.5%
Catholicism	0.4%
Protestantism	0.3%
Islam	17.0%
No religion	3.7%
Prefer not to answer, others and indefinable	10.1%

== See also ==
- Provinces of Bulgaria
- Municipalities of Bulgaria
- List of cities and towns in Bulgaria
