= Kardam, Targovishte Province =

Kardam Кардам
- Village
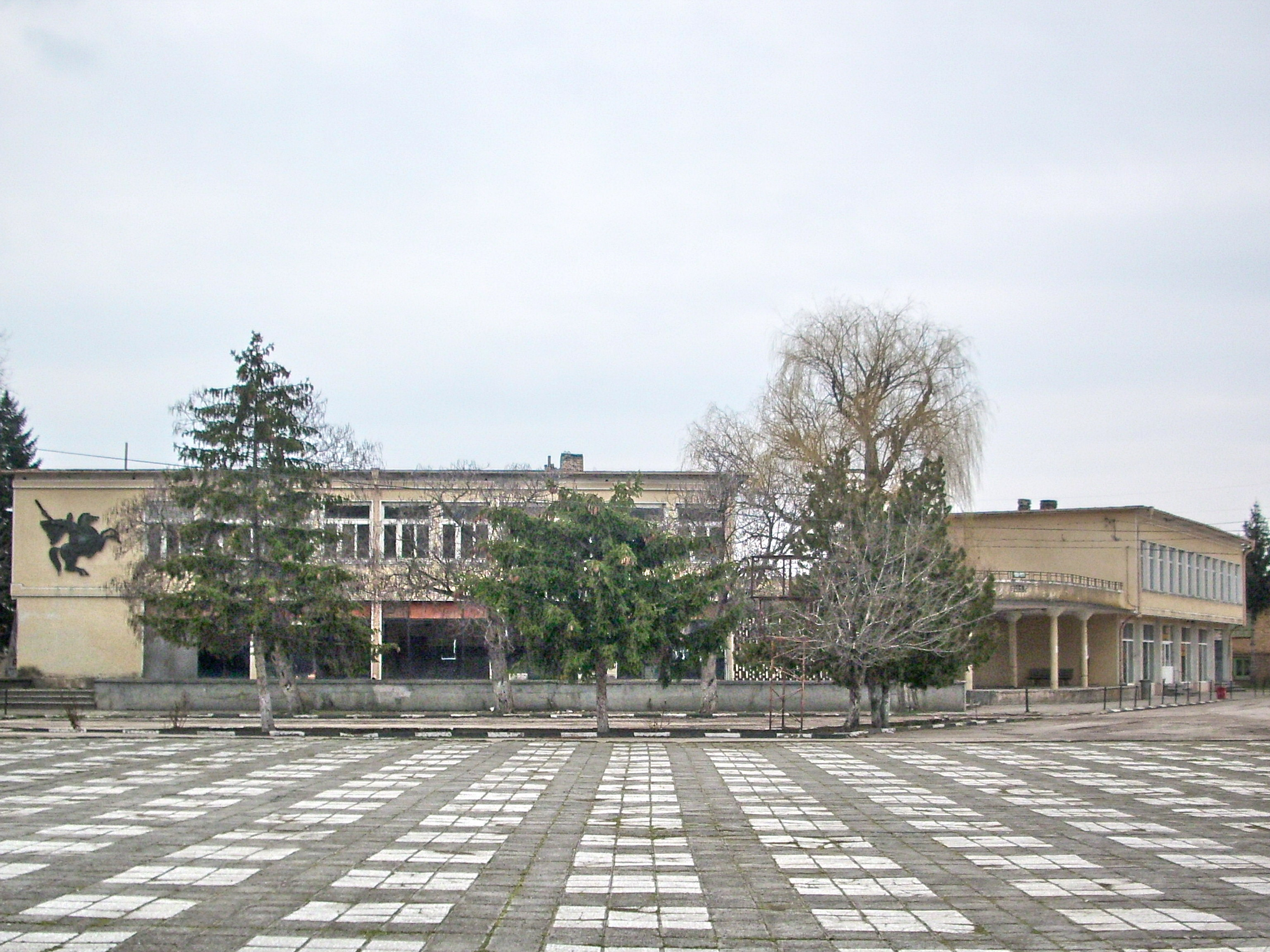
- The central square of the village.

- Location in Bulgaria
- Coordinates: 43.375961°N 26.282722°E
- Country: Bulgaria
- Province: Targovishte Province
- Municipality: Popovo Municipality

Population (2016)
  - Total: 1,568
- Time zone: UTC+2 (EET)
  - Summer (DST): UTC+3 (EEST)

Kardam is a village in Popovo Municipality, in Targovishte Province, Bulgaria.
