= Popovo, Bulgaria =

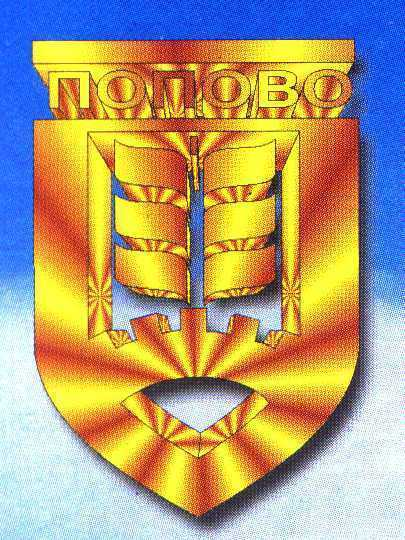
- Coat of arms

- Location of Popovo
- Coordinates: 43°21′N 26°14′E
- Country: Bulgaria
- Province (Oblast): Targovishte

Government
  - Mayor: Ludmil Veselinov
- Elevation: 210 m (690 ft)

Population (Census 2021)
  - City: 13,324
  - Urban: 23,819
- Time zone: UTC+2 (EET)
  - Summer (DST): UTC+3 (EEST)
- Postal Code: 7800
- Area code: 0608

Popovo (Bulgarian: Попово [ˈpɔpovo], from поп, pop, meaning "priest", and the placename suffix -ovo, literally "the priest's village") is a town in northeastern Bulgaria, part of Targovishte Province. It is the administrative centre of the homonymous Popovo Municipality. In 2021, it had a population of 13,324 and an absolute Bulgarian majority.

The town was first mentioned in an Ottoman tax register of 1555.

Popovo Saddle in Imeon Range on Smith Island in the South Shetland Islands, Antarctica is named after Popovo.

== Geography ==
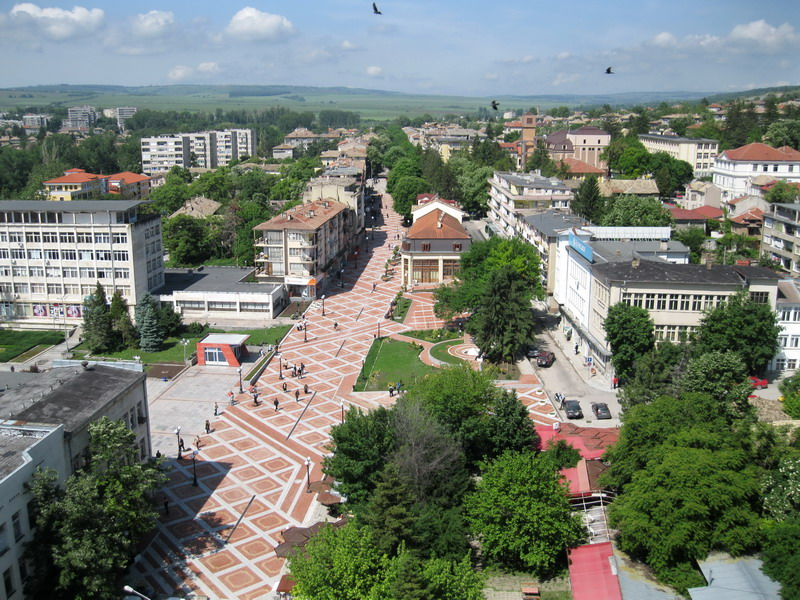
The city's center (2012).

The town is built along the length of the Popovska river (also called Popovski Lom or Kalakoch Dere) on top of two hills opposite from one another and in the valley as well. Not long ago, before the corrections to the Sofia-Varna railway line were completed, the tracks ran by the suburbs of the city. The land of the villages Gagovo, Zaraevo, Kardam, Medovina, and Palamartsa.

== Prehistory and antiquity ==
There are three prehistoric mounds left by Eneolithic and Chalcolithic settlements in the Popovo area, one northwest of the city and those in the Nevsky and Seyachi neighbourhoods, as well as nine Thracian tombstones from the Roman epoch. Tombstone mounds are divided into two mound necropolises. Most of them were plundered by illegal treasure hunters.

The nearby Roman fort at Kovachevsko kale is notable for its size and remaining walls.

== Twin cities ==
- Arzamas, Nizhny Novgorod Oblast, Russia
- Câmpulung, Romania
- Lüleburgaz, Turkey
- Negotino, North Macedonia
- Zaraysk, Moscow Oblast, Russia

== Gallery ==
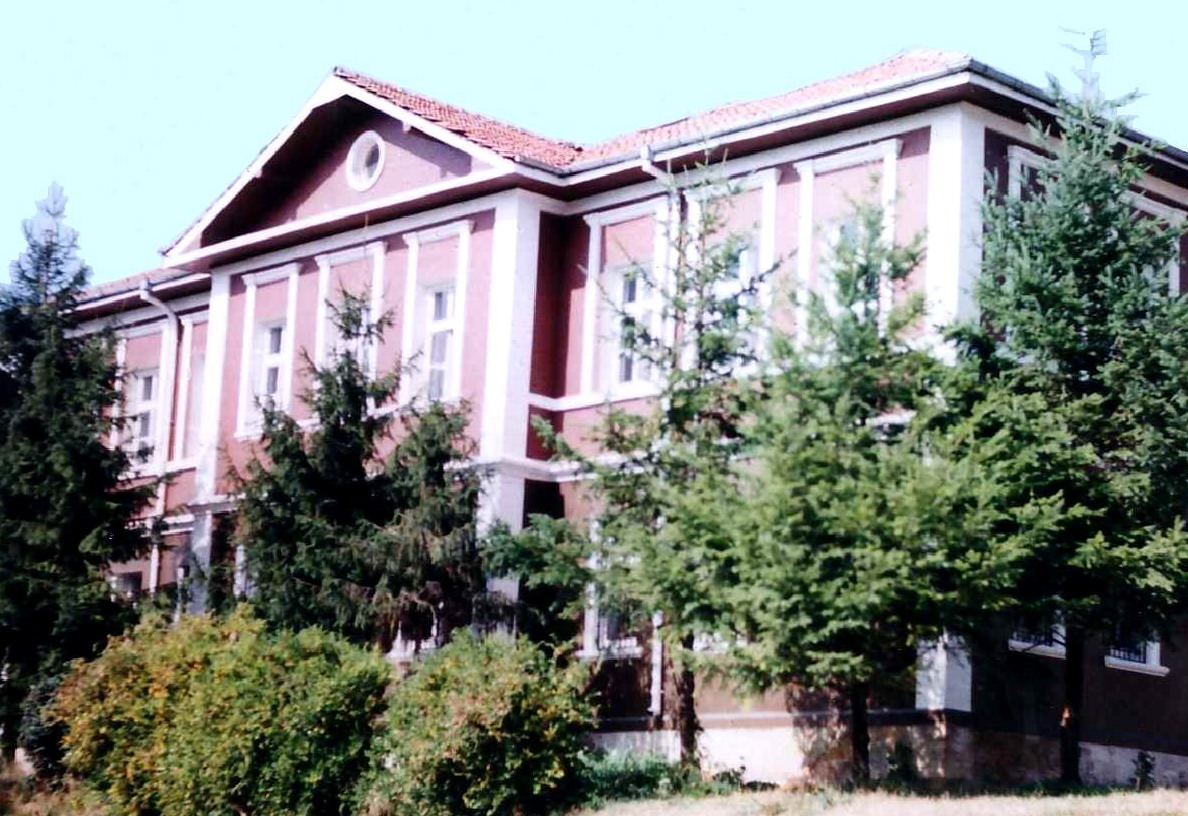
Local museum

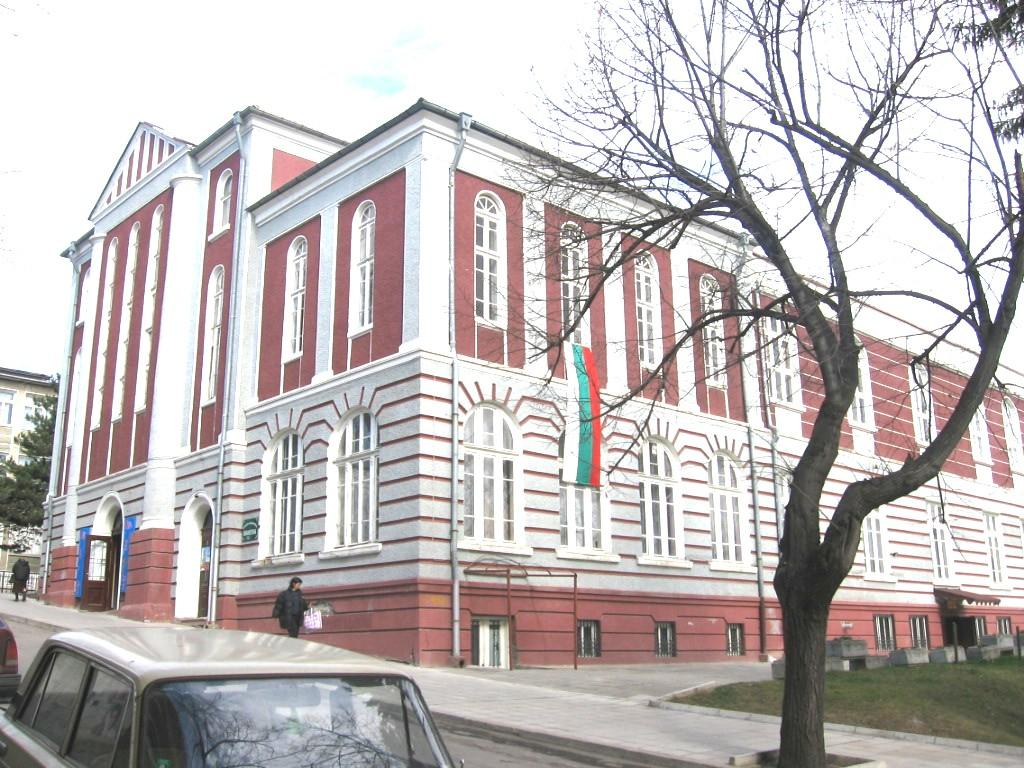
Community centre (chitalishte)

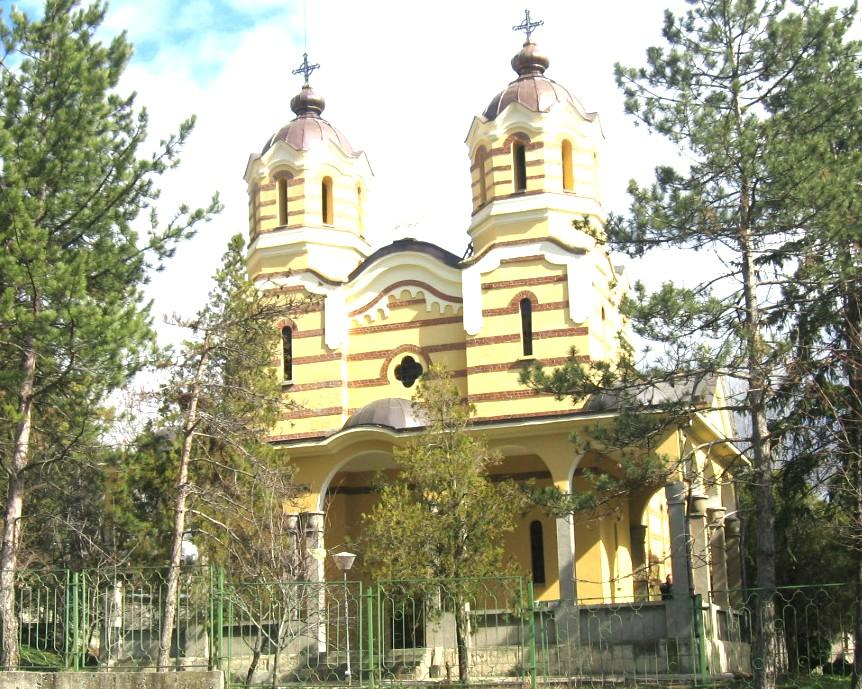
Church of the Dormition of the Mother of God
