= Ruse, Bulgaria =

Ruse Русе
- City
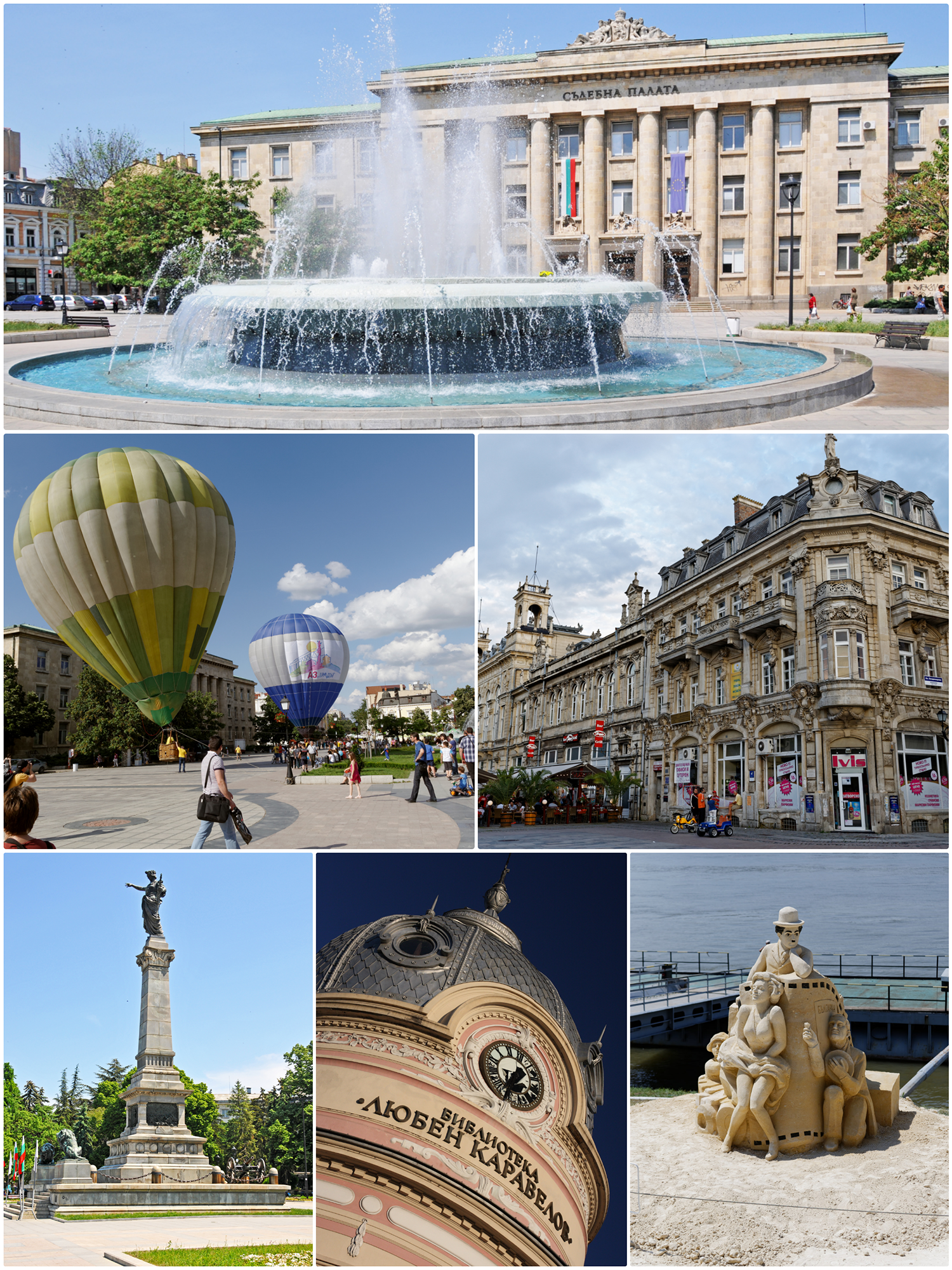
- Top: Ruse Courthouse; Middle left: Ruse Street Ballons Festival; Middle right: Dohodno Zdanie (Sava Ornianov Theater); Bottom left: Monument of Freedom; Bottom middle: Lyuben Karavelov Library; Bottom right: Ruse International Sand Sculpture Festival

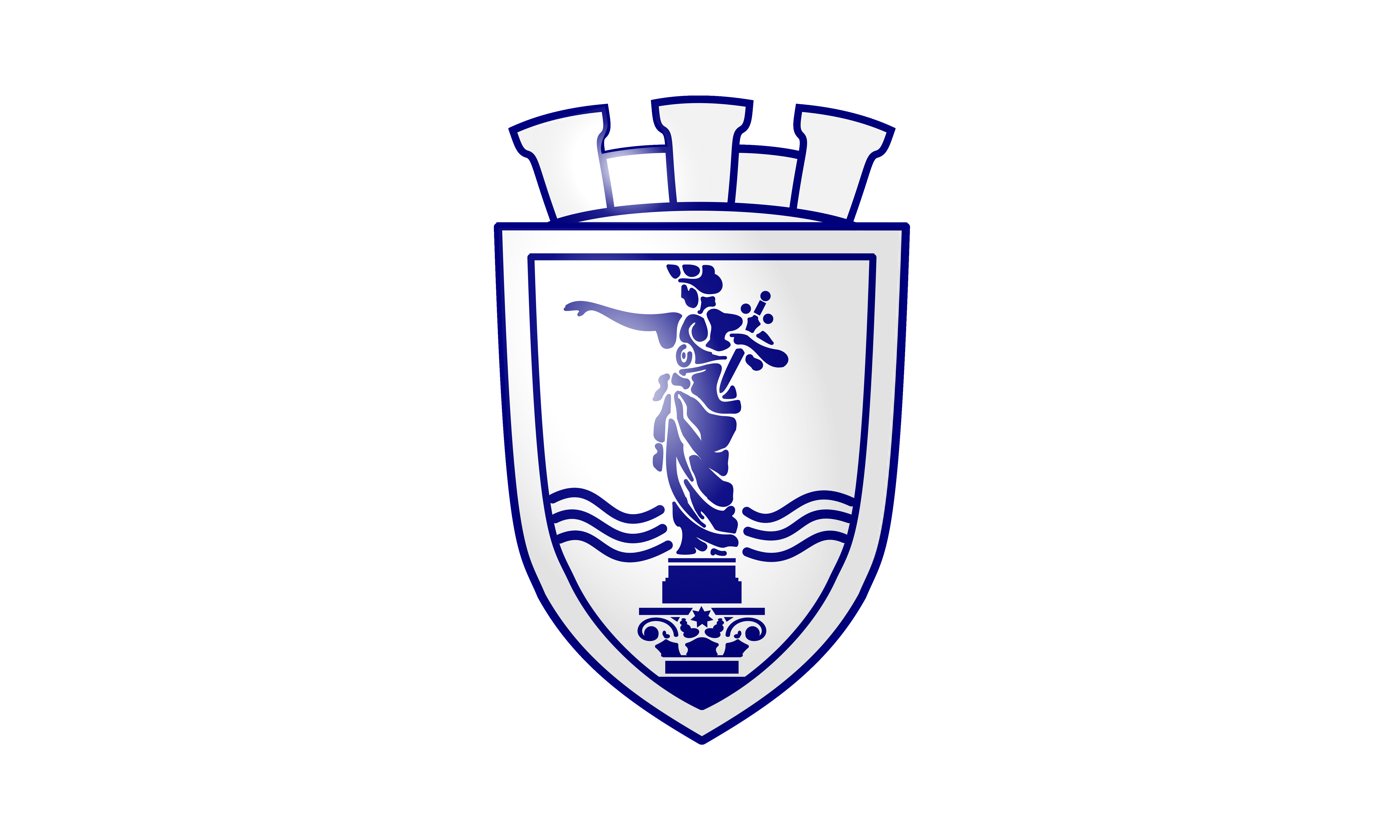
- Flag Coat of arms
- Nickname: Little Vienna; Малката Виена (Bulgarian); Malkata Viena (transliteration)
- Location of Ruse Ruse (Balkans)
- Coordinates: 43°49′23″N 25°57′14″E
- Country: Bulgaria
- Oblast: Ruse

Government
  - Mayor: Pencho Milkov (BSP)
- Elevation: 45 m (148 ft)

Population (2024)
  - City: 121,168
  - Urban: 137,159
- Time zone: UTC+2 (EET)
  - Summer (DST): UTC+3 (EEST)
- Postal Code: 7000
- Area code: +359 82
- Website: www.ruse-bg.eu/setlang/en/

Ruse (also transliterated as Rousse, Russe; Bulgarian: Русе [ˈrusɛ]) is the sixth-largest city in Bulgaria. Ruse is in the northeastern part of the country, on the right bank of the Danube, opposite the Romanian city of Giurgiu, approximately 67 km (42 mi) south of Bucharest, Romania's capital, 172 km (107 mi) from Varna, and 249 km (155 mi) from the capital Sofia. Thanks to its location and its railway and road bridge over the Danube (Danube or Friendship Bridge), it is the most significant Bulgarian river port, serving an important part of the international trade of the country. It is the 12th-largest of all cities on the river Danube.

Ruse is known for its 19th- and 20th-century Neo-Baroque and Neo-Rococo architecture, which attracts many tourists. It is often called the Little Vienna. The Friendship Bridge between Ruse and Giurgiu was the only one to join the Bulgarian and Romanian banks of the Danube until 14 June 2013, when the New Europe Bridge was built between Vidin and Calafat.

Ruse is the birthplace of the Nobel laureate in Literature Elias Canetti and the writer Michael Arlen.

Ruse is on the right bank of the river Danube, which is the high bank, having two underwater terraces and three river terraces at 15 to 22 m (49.21–72.18 ft), 30 to 66 m (98.43–216.54 ft), and 54 to 65 m (177.17–213.25 ft). The average altitude is 45.5 m (149.28 ft) AMSL. The urban area is an approximately 11-km ellipse running along the river. The city extends from the land-connected Matey (Матей) island and the mouth of Rusenski Lom on the west to Srabcheto (Сръбчето) hill on the east. During the 20th century, the west end of the city was significantly modified by moving the mouth of Rusenski Lom to the west, as well as by moving the bank itself with its fairway considerably to the north. Sarabair (саръбаир, from Turkish Sarıbayır meaning "Yellow Slope") hill is to the south of the city and is 159 m (521.65 ft) high. The Rousse TV Tower is built there on the remains of Leventtabia, a former Turkish fortification.

== Etymology ==
Scholars suggest that the city on the river bank derived its present name from the root *ru- ("river", "stream") or from the Cherven fortress, meaning "red", through the root rous, which is present in many Slavic languages.

A popular legend claims that the name Ruse comes from the name of a female founder of the city, whose name was Rusa, meaning "blonde hair". In the 13th and 14th centuries, during the time of the Second Bulgarian Empire, a fortified settlement called Rusi, first mentioned in 1380, emerged near the ruins of the earlier Roman town.

Other theories include settlement by people from the Rus era; a connection to the village of Rusokastro in Burgas Province; an unattested tribe of Getae with a name such as Riusi, or; the pagan festival of Rosalia.

== History ==
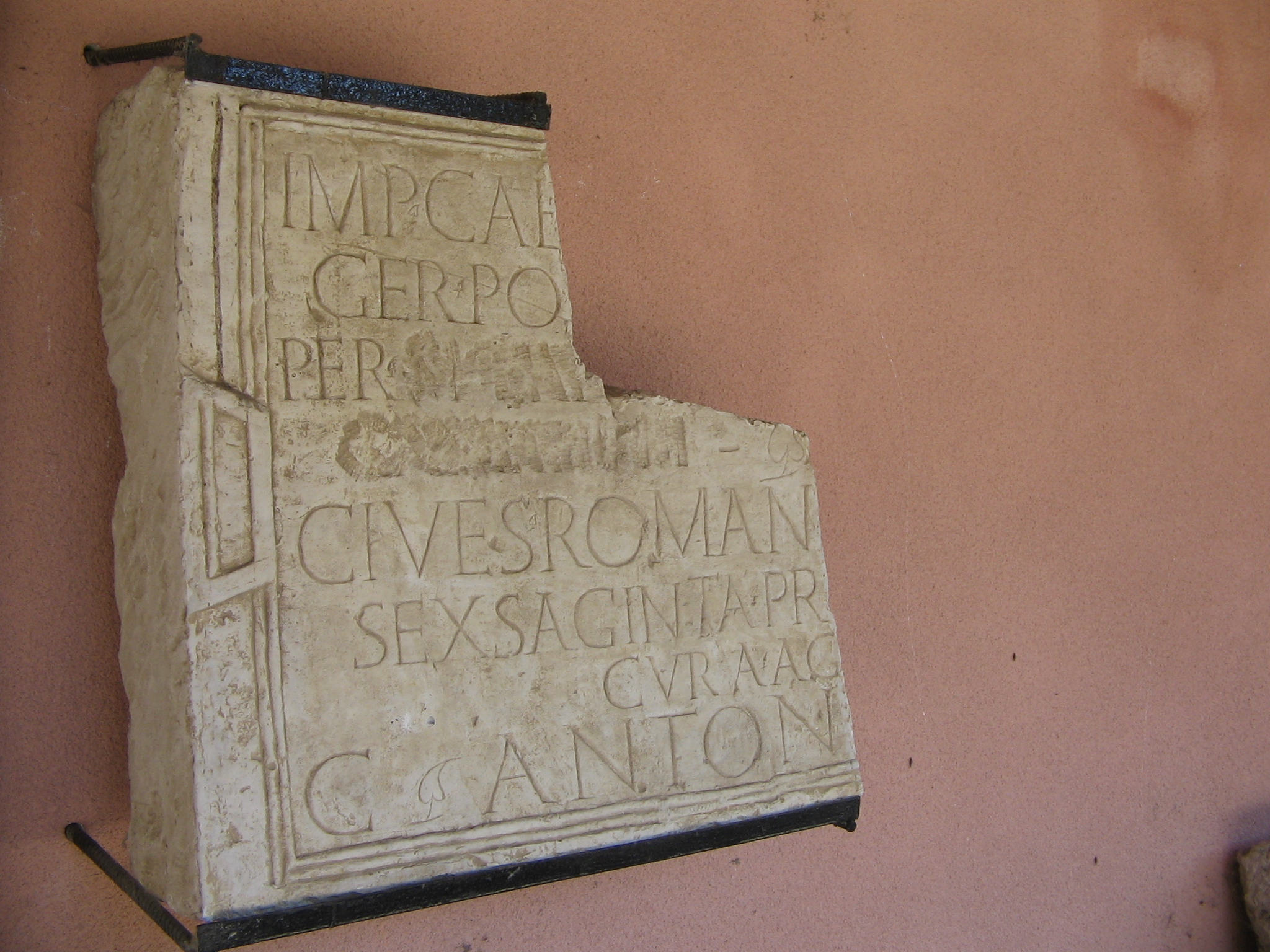
An inscription from the Sexaginta Prista fortress

=== Prehistory to medieval era ===
The city emerged from a Neolithic settlement of the 3rd to 2nd millennium BCE, when pottery, fishing, agriculture, and hunting developed. Excavations have revealed several layers, suggesting that the place was attacked by neighbouring tribes and suffered from natural disasters. Ancient sanctuaries were found nearby, where idols of a pregnant woman, a fertility goddess, were prevalent.

The later Thracian settlement developed into a Roman military and naval centre during the reign of Vespasian (69–70 CE), as part of Limes Moesiae, the fortification system along the northern boundary of Moesia. Its name, Sexaginta Prista, suggests a meaning of "a city of 60 ships" (from Latin: sexaginta — "60" and Greek: pristis — a special type of guard ship), based on the supposed 60 nearby berths. It served as a base for the Roman Danube fleet, which protected against raids from peoples living north of that river, and for Legio I Italica.

The site is mentioned by Claudius Ptolemy and Antoninus Pius. The fort was on the main road between Singidunum (modern Belgrade) and the Danube Delta Hungarian historian Felix Philipp Kanitz was the first to identify Sexaginta Prista with Ruse and to discover its fort, but the brothers Karel and Hermann Škorpil demonstrated the link later through studying inscriptions, coins, graves, and objects of daily life, becoming the first scientific excavators or the site.

An inscription from the reign of Diocletian proves that the city was rebuilt as a praesidium (a large fortification) after it was destroyed by the Goths in 250 CE. In the 4th and 5th centuries, the settlement was the seat of a bishop, before being destroyed in the 6th century by Avar and Slavic raids. The settlement was mentioned as Golyamo Yorgovo in the Middle Ages, whose present successor is Giurgiu in Romania.

=== Ottoman rule ===
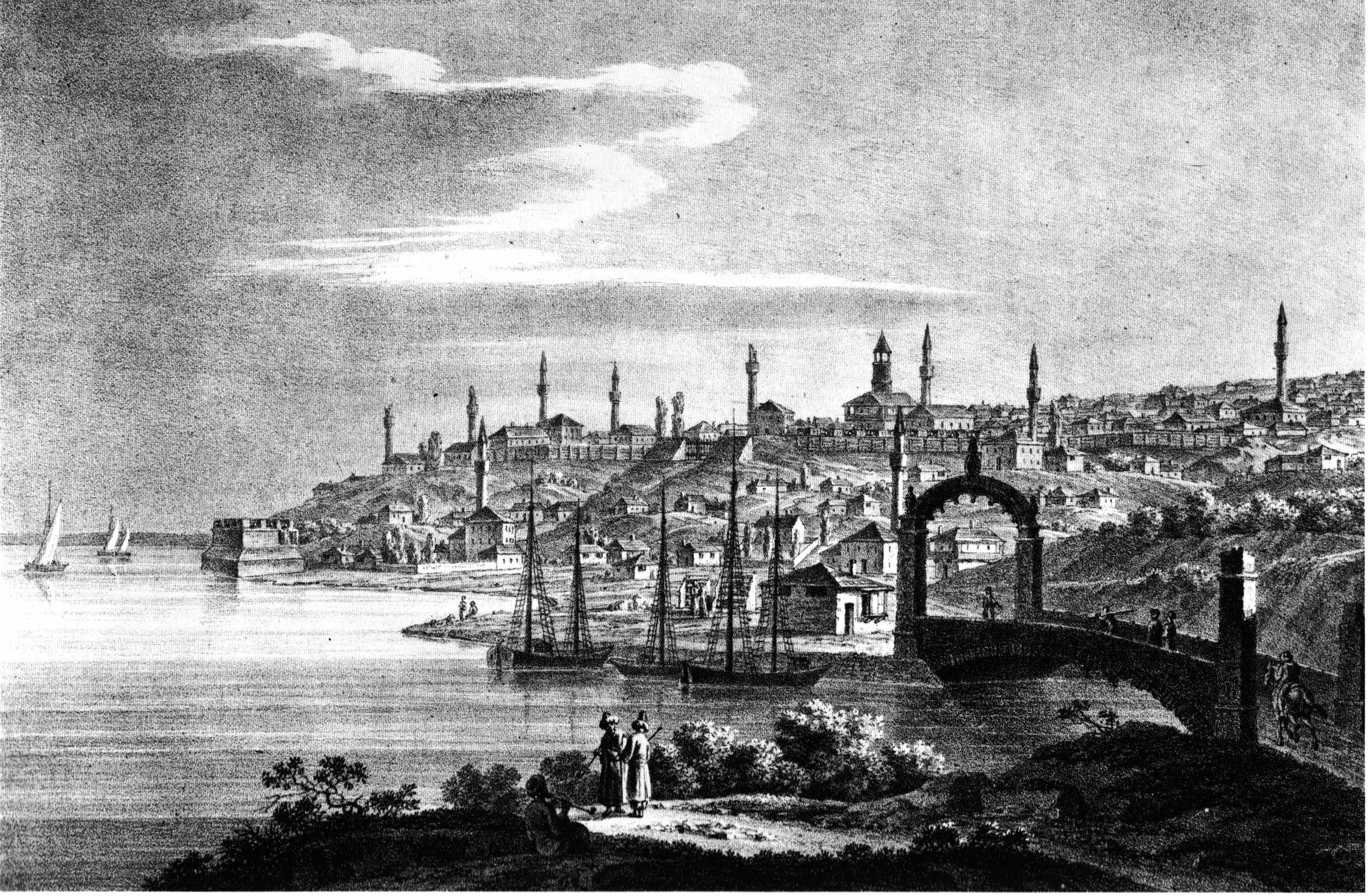
Illustration of Ruse in 1824

During Ottoman rule, the Ottomans destroyed the town, reacting to a 1595 unsuccessful liberation attempt by a joint Vlach-Bulgarian army, led by Michael the Brave. After its rebuilding in the following years, Ruse was dubbed Rusçuk (Turkish for "little Ruse") and had again expanded into a large fortress by the 18th century. It later grew into one of the most important Ottoman towns on the Danube and an administrative centre of Tuna Vilayet, which extended from Varna and Tulcea to Sofia and Niš.

The Dunav newspaper appeared — it was the first printed in Bulgaria and in Bulgarian. Some Bulgarian schools were founded. The streets are renamed and numbered for the first time in Bulgarian lands. A post office, hospital, home for the aged were founded. Three empires met here for trading: Austro-Hungary, Russia, British Empire. France and Italy opened consulates in Ruse. The modern city arose from the shades of the settlement. In 1865 the Obraztsov Chiflik was founded on the place where the English Consul's farm was; it was the first modern farm on the territory of the whole Ottoman Empire of that time.

Ruse developed into a centre of the Bulgarian National Revival and hosted the headquarters of the Bulgarian Revolutionary Central Committee.

=== Early Modern Bulgaria ===
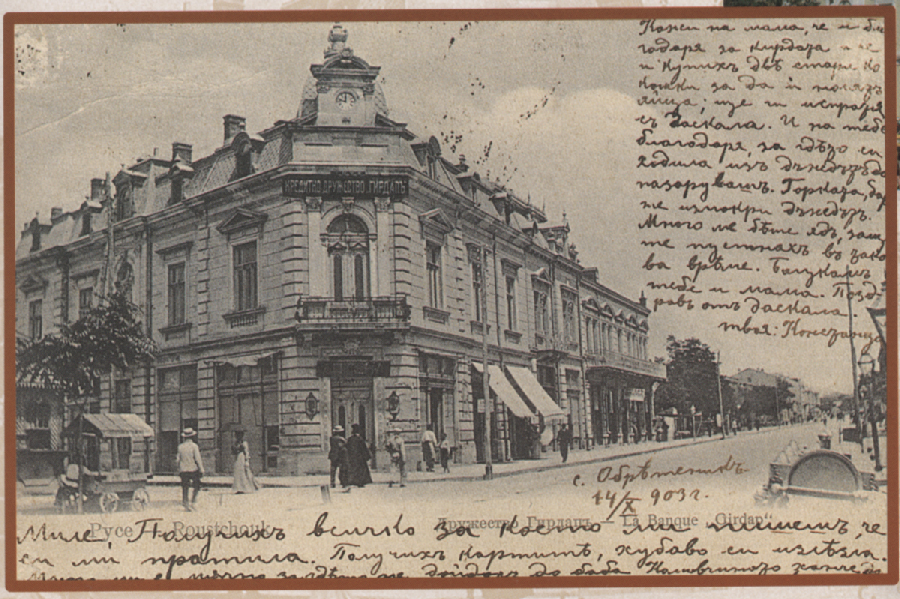
The first private bank in Bulgaria — „Girdap"

After it became part of modern Bulgaria on 20 February 1878, Ruse was one of the key cultural and economic centres of the country. Intensive building during the period changed the city's architectural appearance to a typical Central European one. Ruse is known for the many first innovations in Bulgaria, including:

- 1864 – the first printing office in Bulgaria;
- 1867 – the first railway line linking Ruse and Varna, was launched into operation;
- 1879 – the first agronomical school "Obraztsov chiflik", today – Agricultural scientific research institute, currently profiled in agriculture and seed science;
- 1881 – the first steel ship in Bulgaria was built;
- 1881 – the first privately owned Bulgarian bank Girdap;
- 1881 – the Machine School for the Navy, the first technical school in Bulgaria. Later it was moved to Varna;
- 1883 – the first Weather station;
- 1884 – the first Bulgarian pharmacy association;
- 1885 – the first Bulgarian technical association was instituted;
- 1890 – the first Chamber of Commerce and Industry;
- 1891 – the first private insurance company "Bulgaria";
- 1896 – the first manually operated elevator;
- 1897 – the first movie projection. The second was a month later in the capital Sofia;

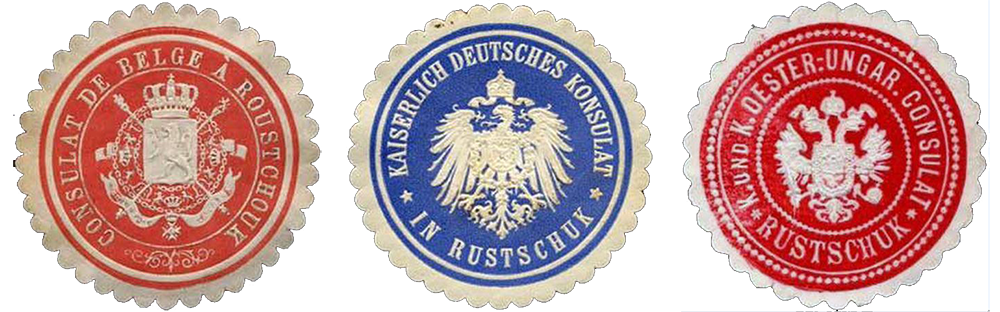
Official seals of foreign consulates in Ruse

Ruse had the first Bulgarian factories for soda water, lemonade, and for neckties. The first aviator Simeon Petrov was born in Ruse.

In the newly liberated Bulgaria of the late 19th century, Ruse was a cosmopolitan city with a multiethnic population. According to the first census conducted in 1883, ethnic Bulgarians made up 43% of the population, Turks 39%, and Jews 7%.

"All façades on main streets of Russe shall have rich decorations with plastic stone", postulate the Regulations for Constructions of Private Buildings of 1893, issued by the Municipality of Russe.

After knyaz Alexander Battenberg's 1886 abdication, and as a reaction to the regentship's course led by prime minister Stefan Stambolov, a group of Russophile (pro-Russian) military officers revolted in Ruse. The riot was violently crushed, and 13 of the leaders were quickly sentenced to death and executed near the city, which caused much public discontent. Decades later, in 1934, local citizens raised funds and built a monument at the place where the Russophile officers were executed. The monument was blown up in 1940 but rebuilt in 1966 at approximately the same spot.

=== Early 20th century ===
- 1908 – The first factory for iron beds in Modern Bulgaria. Today Ruse is a major centre of furniture manufacturing.
- 1911 was marked off with the start of a project for an electrical station by "Siemens-Schukert". On 17 February 1917 Ruse became the third electrified city in the country (after Sofia and Varna).
- In 1913 Belgian entrepreneurs and engineers were granted a concession for a period of 25 years and built the largest sugar factory in Bulgaria.

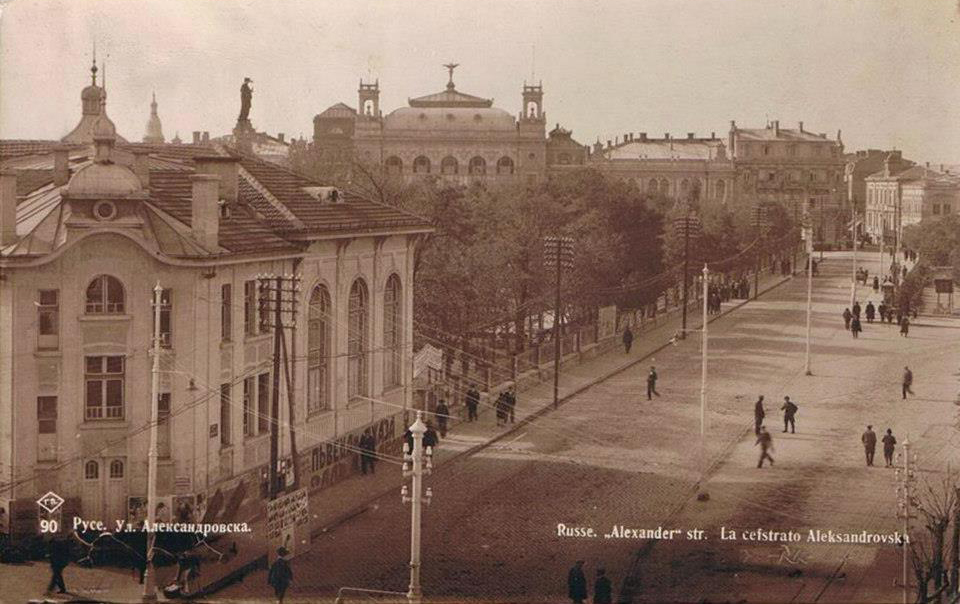
The Municipal casino, Ruse – 1920

- 1927 – the first sock-making factory in Bulgaria opened in Ruse. "Fazan" still exists today;
- 1933 – the first oil refinery was constructed;

Between World War I and II, after Southern Dobruja was lost to Romania, the economic significance of the city decreased. So did the population: Ruse was no longer the second-largest city in Bulgaria (after former East Rumelian capital Plovdiv), being quickly surpassed by Sofia and Varna. Foreign consulates were closed, except for the Russian one, which remained functional until 2022. Only for the period between 1919 and 1920 the capital loss is estimated at around 40 million leva.

=== World War II period ===
The return of Southern Dobrudja to Bulgaria in September 1940 fostered good conditions for the restoration of the city's leading role. It became a provincial centre, and economic activity revived. Typical for the post-war architecture of the city was the wide use of iron, concrete and glass as construction materials. Examples are the River port – 1931, the Freight station – 1935, Market Hall – 1939 and the Court house – 1940.

=== Communist period ===
The construction of the Ruse-Giurgiu bridge in 1954 and the fast industrialization gave a new push to development. Ruse emerged again as an important economic, transport, cultural, and education hub. Engineering, chemical, and light industries expanded; a large harbor was built, and the city became a university centre. At the 1985 census, a population of more than 186,000 was reported.

In the early 1980s, Ruse entered a dark period. The Verachim factory was built in Giurgiu, which polluted the air between 1980 and 1991, impacting the city's development. The population decreased, and 15,000 people moved out between 1985 and 1992. The first informal organization in Bulgaria under the communist regime was established here - The Public Committee for Environmental Protection of Ruse, which provoked the first nationwide demonstrations and strongly influenced the change to democracy. In 1991, the Romanian factory ceased the pollution, after the fall of the communist regime in Romania.

=== Democratic Bulgaria ===
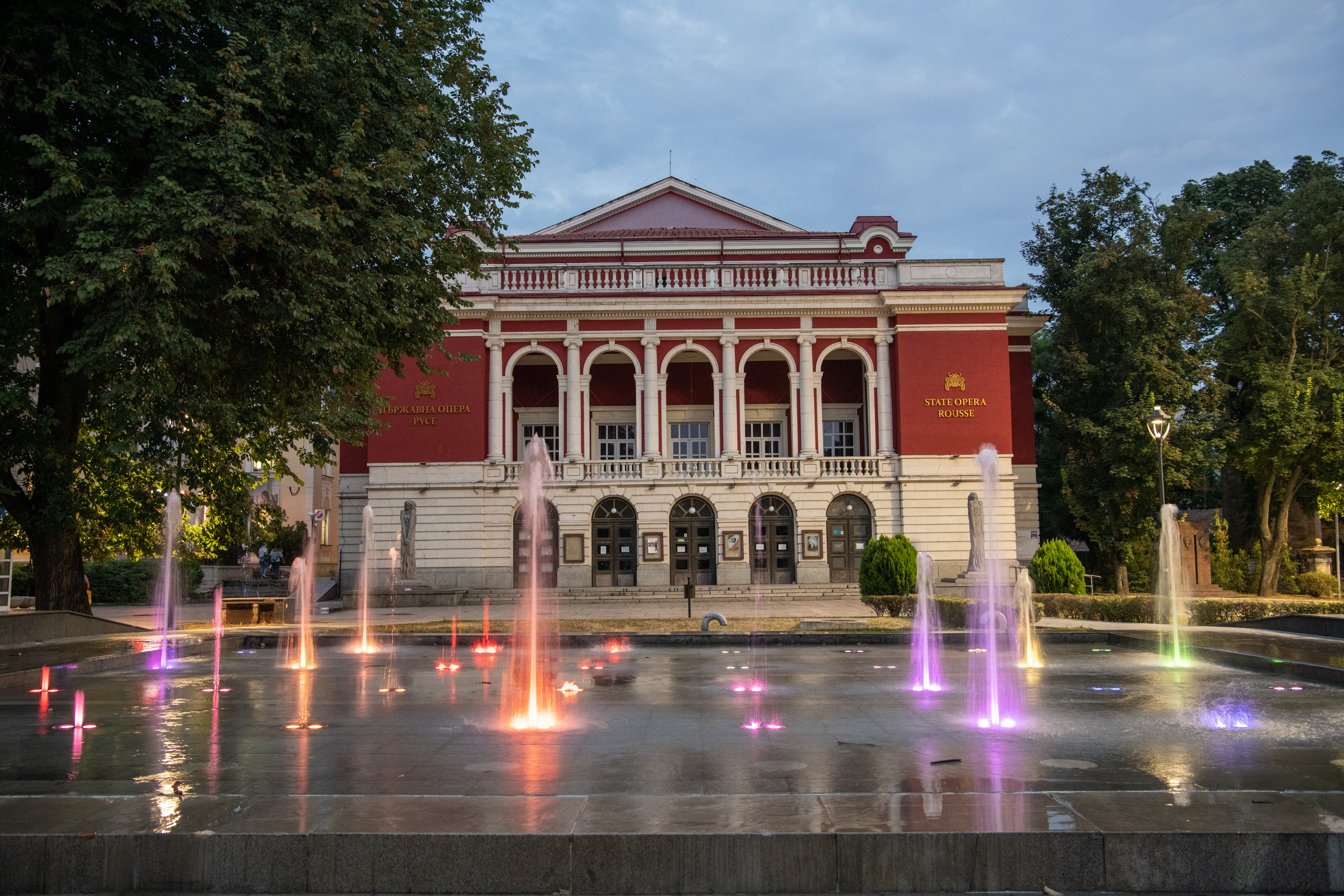
Rousse Opera

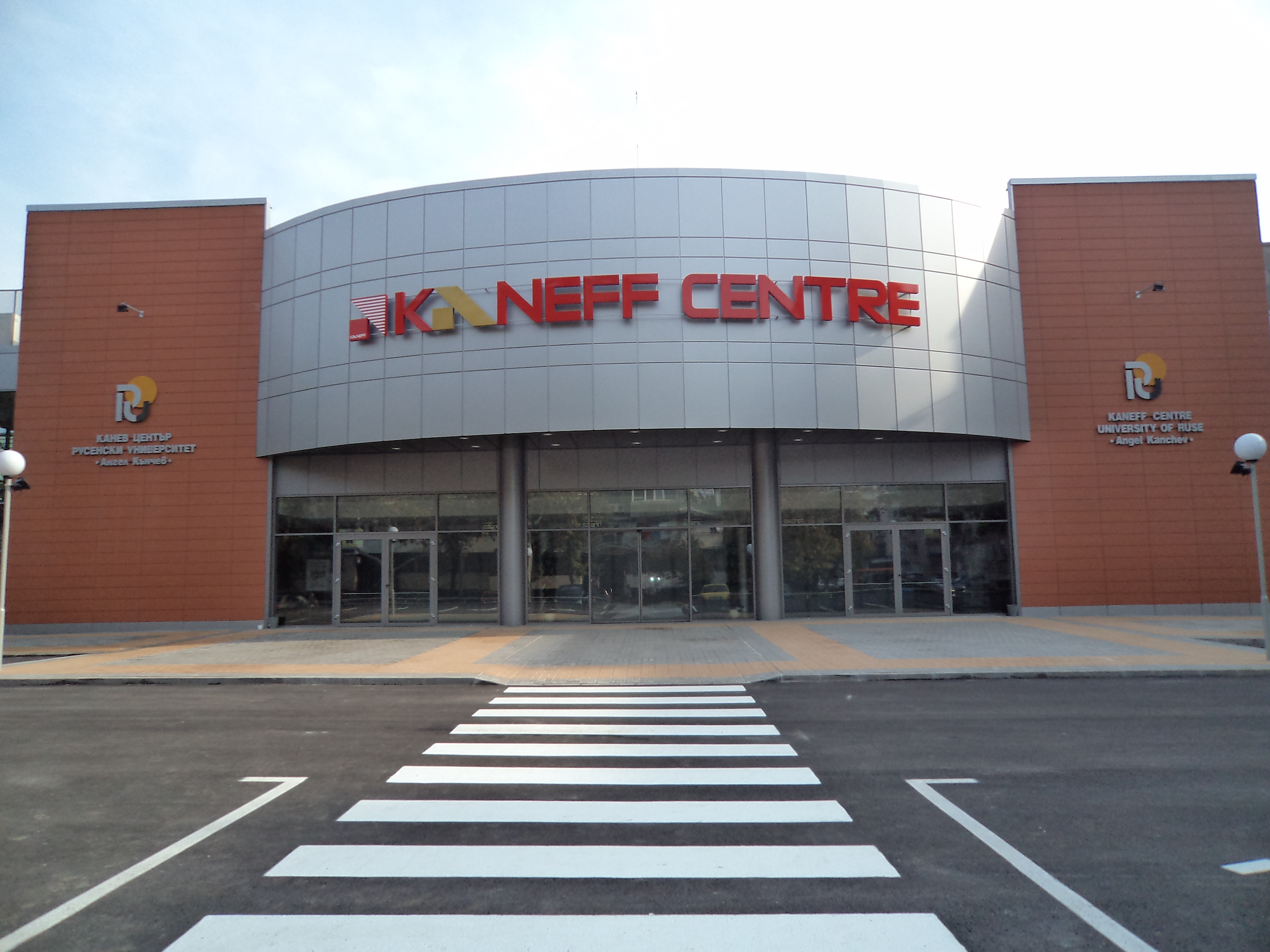
Kaneff center

Like other post-socialist regimes in eastern Europe, Bulgaria found the transition to capitalism rather painful and not as easy as expected. State-owned enterprises lost their former markets and could not adapt to the now free-market competition. This led to massive unemployment in the city and emigration waves in the 90s. Since 2000, Ruse has been continually regaining its former leading status. The urban economics were positively influenced by the 2007's accession of Bulgaria and Romania in the European Union, which allowed deeper cross-border cooperation. The flow of investments through EU funds restarted long suspended projects which were finally completed.

After decades of construction, the new corpus of the University of Ruse was inaugurated in 2010.

In 2011, the city's centre was renovated through an EU project, worth 10 million leva. Included in the project, a Dry Deck Fountain was introduced in an urban environment for the first time in Bulgaria. The exterior of the Rousse State Opera was reconditioned.

A water treatment facility, an investment worth 57 million Euro, is now functional.

In 2012, the Rousse Regional Historical Museum completed a project, which allowed the rehabilitation and display of the remains of the Roman city Sexaginta Prista.

Ignat Kaneff, a Bulgarian-born Canadian business magnate, endowed about half of the amount necessary for the construction of a modern conference complex named after him, the Kaneff Centre, at the University of Ruse. It was officially opened on 10 October 2013.

A landmark event for the city was the opening of the new Eco Museum & Aquarium in 2014.

A safer and more efficient navigation in the inland waterways was accomplished with a new structure – the river information system BulRIS. A modern oncology centre is now operating.

Ruse was a candidate for a European Capital of Culture in 2019 with the concept "Free spirit city".

Dohodno zdanie, an imposing Neoclassical edifice in the city centre convincingly won the National competition "Emblematic building of the year" in 2014. Ruse was a host city of the first of its kind in Bulgaria – an International Ice Figures Festival.

The Arena Ruse sports hall with more than 5100 seats opened on 23 July 2015 nearly 40 years after initial construction efforts began. The project was suspended on numerous occasions due to a lack of financing. An underground parking inside the sports hall has also been completed.

On-going projects are the re-cultivation of the old landfill, worth 22,5 million leva. The biggest roundabout in the city with underpasses for pedestrians and cyclists, worth some 10 million leva was reconstructed.

== Geography ==
Ruse is located in the northeastern part of the country, on the right bank of the Danube, opposite the Romanian city of Giurgiu, approximately 75 km (47 mi) south of Bucharest, Romania's capital, 200 km (124 mi) from the Bulgarian Black Sea Coast, and 300 km (186 mi) from the capital Sofia.

=== Climate ===
Ruse has a humid continental climate (Köppen climate classification Dfa) with hot summers and relatively cold winters. Owing to its position on the Danubian Plain, the city's winters can get windy.

Winter temperatures often dip below 0 °C (32 °F), sometimes even to −20 °C (−4 °F). In summer, the average temperature is 25 °C (77 °F). Temperatures frequently reach 35 to 40 °C (95 to 104 °F) in mid-summer in the city centre and stay as low as 18 to 20 °C (64 to 68 °F) during the nights. During spring and autumn, daytime temperatures vary between 17 and 22 °C (63 and 72 °F), and precipitation during this time tends to be higher than in summer, with more frequent yet milder periods of rain. The highest temperature recorded was 43.7 C and the lowest was −27.7 C.

Climate data for Ruse
Month	Jan	Feb	Mar	Apr	May	Jun	Jul	Aug	Sep	Oct	Nov	Dec	Year
Record high °C (°F)	21.5 (70.7)	24.6 (76.3)	29.8 (85.6)	35.4 (95.7)	37.7 (99.9)	42.0 (107.6)	43.7 (110.7)	43.5 (110.3)	41.9 (107.4)	37.0 (98.6)	28.4 (83.1)	22.8 (73.0)	43.7 (110.7)
Mean daily maximum °C (°F)	3.0 (37.4)	6.3 (43.3)	13.0 (55.4)	19.3 (66.7)	25.0 (77.0)	29.2 (84.6)	31.3 (88.3)	31.4 (88.5)	26.1 (79.0)	19.2 (66.6)	11.1 (52.0)	4.9 (40.8)	18.3 (64.9)
Daily mean °C (°F)	−0.1 (31.8)	2.5 (36.5)	7.6 (45.7)	13.3 (55.9)	18.7 (65.7)	22.7 (72.9)	24.9 (76.8)	24.8 (76.6)	19.5 (67.1)	13.1 (55.6)	7.0 (44.6)	1.5 (34.7)	13.0 (55.4)
Mean daily minimum °C (°F)	−3.5 (25.7)	−1.3 (29.7)	3.1 (37.6)	8.0 (46.4)	13.3 (55.9)	17.2 (63.0)	19.2 (66.6)	19.0 (66.2)	14.0 (57.2)	8.3 (46.9)	3.9 (39.0)	−1.1 (30.0)	8.3 (46.9)
Record low °C (°F)	−27.7 (−17.9)	−26.4 (−15.5)	−18.0 (−0.4)	−2.8 (27.0)	2.4 (36.3)	6.6 (43.9)	9.1 (48.4)	9.0 (48.2)	0.8 (33.4)	−5.4 (22.3)	−11.7 (10.9)	−19.5 (−3.1)	−27.7 (−17.9)
Average precipitation mm (inches)	48.1 (1.89)	33.6 (1.32)	41.9 (1.65)	52.0 (2.05)	67.4 (2.65)	68.0 (2.68)	78.1 (3.07)	61.7 (2.43)	32.1 (1.26)	34.0 (1.34)	60.1 (2.37)	47.3 (1.86)	624.2 (24.57)

== Main sights ==
=== Architectural landmarks ===
Ruse is one of the 100 Tourist Sites of Bulgaria. The city is known for its preserved buildings from the end of the 19th and the beginning of the 20th century. There are 272 monuments of culture. Most of the sights of the city are located at the center of Ruse (museums, architectural landmarks, the theater, the opera, hotels, restaurants, cafes and souvenir shops). Among the sights the following are outstanding:

Site	Description	Photo
Monument of Liberty	The Monument of Liberty was built at the beginning of the 20th century by the Italian sculptor Arnoldo Zocchi. As time went by, it gained significance as one of the city's symbols, and now forms a part of its coat of arms.	
Dohodno Zdanie ("Sava Ognianov" theater)	Dohodno Zdanie is an imposing Neoclassical edifice in the city centre of Ruse, built in 1898–1902 to accommodate the local theatre performances. Along with the Monument of Liberty it is a symbol of the city.	
"Aleksandrovska" street	The main street of the city is "Aleksandrovska". It is an architectural ensemble of buildings in Neo-Baroque, Neo-Rococo and other architectural styles. 43°51′0.99″N 25°57′16.77″E	
The first private bank "Girdap" (The town's clock)	Girdap was the first privately owned Bulgarian bank. Established in Ruse in 1881, Girdap was among the six largest banks in Bulgaria, and during the wars its financial group was the most influential in the country. Today the main building houses the administration of Ruse's Chamber of Commerce and it's a favorite meeting point.	
The old city centre of Ruse	The old city centre is the square around the Rousse Historical Museum. The regional library "Lyuben Karavelov" is located on the square. The building is decorated with baroque ornaments- leaves, pearles and rosettes. The former bank of Ivan and Stefan Simeonov is situated at the beginning of "Aleksandrovska" street. The building is in the typical for Ruse, baroque style. 43°50′39.36″N 25°56′53.23″E	
„La Butika" and the house of Elias Canetti, Nobel Prize laureate in Literature – 1981	Store „Canetti" or „La Butika" - as mentioned in the book „Die gerettete Zunge" is the trade store of the grandfather of the writer. Built in 1898 by the architect Negohos Bedrysan, it's located on „Slavianska" street. The house of the Nobel Prize laureate is located on „Gen Gurko" 13 street and is a monument of culture of a national significance.	
The house of Andrea Turio	The house of Andrea Turio was completed in 1900. The input materials for the construction were carefully chosen from all over the world. The halls of the house are decorated in Pompeii art style. 43°50′53.16″N 25°56′47.9″E	
Insurance company "Bulgaria"	Insurance company "Bulgaria" was the first one in Bulgaria. It was created in 1891. The building is located on the main street "Aleksandrovska" and it was constructed in the neoclassicism architectural style. 43°50′51.6″N 25°57′4.74″E	
Old High School of Music	The "Old High School of Music" is an abandoned historic building, built in 1900–1901. The architectural style is eclectic, combining neoclassical and gothic revival elements and Northern European influences. The building is currently being reconstructed to become the first private museum in Bulgaria. 43°50′40.68″N 25°57′15.44″E	
The flower vase	The flower vase is located at the city's park. Its height is 3.40 metres (11.2 feet) and its width is 7 metres (23 feet). 43°51′23.82″N 25°57′49.77″E	
Holy Trinity Cathedral	The orthodox church "Holy Trinity" is the oldest building in the city and dates back to 1632. Being constructed during the Ottoman yoke it had to be built underground, so visitors entering the temple now have to go down stairs four and a half metres (15 ft) instead of going up as it is in most churches. 43°50′51.38″N 25°57′23.86″E	
Basarbovo Monastery	The Monastery of Saint Dimitar Basarbowski is a Bulgarian-orthodox cave monastery near the city of Ruse. The oldest written mention of the monastery dates to the 15th century in an Ottoman tax register. 43°46′01″N 25°57′50″E	
Kunt Kapu	Kunt Kapu was the southern gate of the Rousse fortress built in 1820, during the Ottoman Rule of Bulgaria. It is the only thing left from the fortification.	
Rousse TV Tower	The Rousse TV Tower is a 204-metre-high TV tower built of reinforced concrete. The structure was constructed as a 206-metre-high TV tower with a cafe/restaurant on top and was the tallest one on the Balkan peninsula until 2001. In the 1990s an additional antenna was added bringing the height to 210 metres (690 feet). And, in March 2007, the antenna was reconstructed bringing its height to 204 metres (669 feet). 43°49′27″N 25°57′28″E	

=== Natural landmarks ===
Site	Description	Photo
Rusenski lom (park)	Nature Park of Rusenski Lom is one of the ten nature parks of Bulgaria. It is situated along the canyon type valley of Rusenski Lom River – the last right feeder of the Danube. The park has been announced as a protected area in 1970 and embraces a territory of 3408 hectares. The park is recognized as an interesting and precious site of high aesthetic value preserving riverside terraces, meanders, high vertical rocks, areas of rich variety of species, caves, rock formations, historical monuments of national and international significance. 43°37′55.56″N 26°4′9.06″E	
Lipnik park	It is situated near the village of Nikolovo, 10 km (6 mi) away from Rusе. The park's size is around 2000 hectares and the main flora consists of linden trees.	
Orlova chuka cave	This cave is an archaeological reserve, located 8 km (5 mi) near Dve Mogili. The remains of prehistoric people and a cave bear were found there. The cave is the habitat of more than 10 types of bats, thousands of them living there in the winter. This is the longest cave in North Bulgaria (13 km) and the second cave by length in Bulgaria (has about 15 km (9 mi) of tunnels at 7 levels). 43°35′23.68″N 25°57′37.01″E	

== Culture ==
=== Theatres and opera houses ===
Noted for its rich culture, Ruse hosts a philharmonic orchestra, the Rousse State Opera (founded in 1949) and the "Sava Ognianov" theater.

=== Museums and exhibitions ===
Site	Description	Photo
Rousse Historical Museum	The Rousse Regional Historical Museum was established in 1904. It holds approximately 140,000 items, including the Borovo Treasure; the finds of excavations of the antique Danube castles Yatrus and Sexaginta Prista, and of the medieval Bulgarian city – Cherven; a collection of urban clothing, china, glass, and silver from the end of the 19th — beginning of the 20th century.	
Roman fortress "Sexaginta Prista"	Sexaginta Prista is located at the city of Ruse. The name means "the port town of the sixty ships".	
Eco Museum & Aquarium	The museum's collection includes species from the Danube valley. Visitors can see a rich exposition of fossils, prehistoric mammals and dioramas, three-dimensional replicas of nature landscapes. Exhibited in the museum are the biggest freshwater aquarium in Bulgaria and a scale model of Woolly mammoth (Mammuthus primigenius).	
Rock-hewn Churches of Ivanovo	The Rock-hewn Churches of Ivanovo are a group of monolithic churches, chapels and monasteries hewn out of solid rock, located near the village of Ivanovo, 20 km (12 mi) south of Ruse, on the high rocky banks of the park Rusenski Lom. The complex is noted for its well-preserved medieval frescoes. The Rock-hewn Churches of Ivanovo are included in the UNESCO World Heritage List since 1979.	
National Transport Museum	The National Transport Museum is situated on the bank of the Danube, in the country's first railway station, built in 1866.	
"Urban lifestyle of Rousse" museum	The exposition represents the role of Ruse as a gateway towards Europe, and the influx of European urban culture into Bulgaria at the end of the 19th and the beginning of the 20th century. Sample interior layouts are shown, of a drawing-room, a living-room, a music hall and a bedroom, with furniture from Vienna, as well as collections of urban clothing, of jewelry and other accessories, of silverware (cutlery) and china, which mark the changes present in the daily life of Ruse citizens. The first grand piano, imported into Bulgaria from Vienna, can be seen here.	
Pantheon of National Revival Heroes	The Pantheon of National Revival Heroes is a national monument and an ossuary, located in the city of Ruse. 39 famous Bulgarians are buried in it, including Lyuben Karavelov, Zahari Stoyanov, Stefan Karadzha, Panayot Hitov, Tonka Obretenova, Nikola Obretenov, Panayot Volov, Angel Kanchev, etc.	
The stronghold of Cherven	The stronghold of Cherven was one of the Second Bulgarian Empire's primary military, administrative, economic and cultural centres between the 12th and the 14th century. The ruins of the fortress are located near the village of the same name 30 to 35 km (19 to 22 mi) south of Rousse, northeastern Bulgaria.	
"Zahari Stoyanov" museum	Zahari Stoyanov was a Bulgarian revolutionary, writer, and historian. The museum shows expositions from the Bulgarian Revival period and about the life and struggles of Zahari Stoyanov.	
„Tonka Obretenova" museum	Baba Tonka house museum is dedicated to the Bulgarian National Revival and the life path of Tonka Obretenova. The Revolutionary Committee of Rousse was established here in 1872 and later became central for the whole country.	
Toma Kardzhiev House Museum	The museum is dedicated to the life path of the Bulgarian revolutionary and one of the combatants for the liberation of Bulgaria – Toma Kardzhiev.	

=== Libraries ===
- The Regional Library "Lyuben Karavelov"
- The Austrian Library, located in the 2nd floor of the theater and home of the International Elias Canetti Society.

=== Regular events ===
- The March Music Days is an international music festival for classical music.
- St George's Day (6 May) is Ruse's holiday. A local fair is organized for a week around this date.
- Ruse Carnival is a masquerade held around 24 June, Enyovden.
- The Sexaginta Prista Summer Stage is an urban festival. Events are hosted at the Roman castle every Friday from May through October.
- At the end of October are BG MediaMarket and the Bulgarian Europe Media Festival.
- The Skate-Festival "Collision Course" is taking place in May since 2007.
- Since 2008 the Literary Spring Parlour is organized by the International Elias Canetti Society in April or May.

=== Religious buildings ===
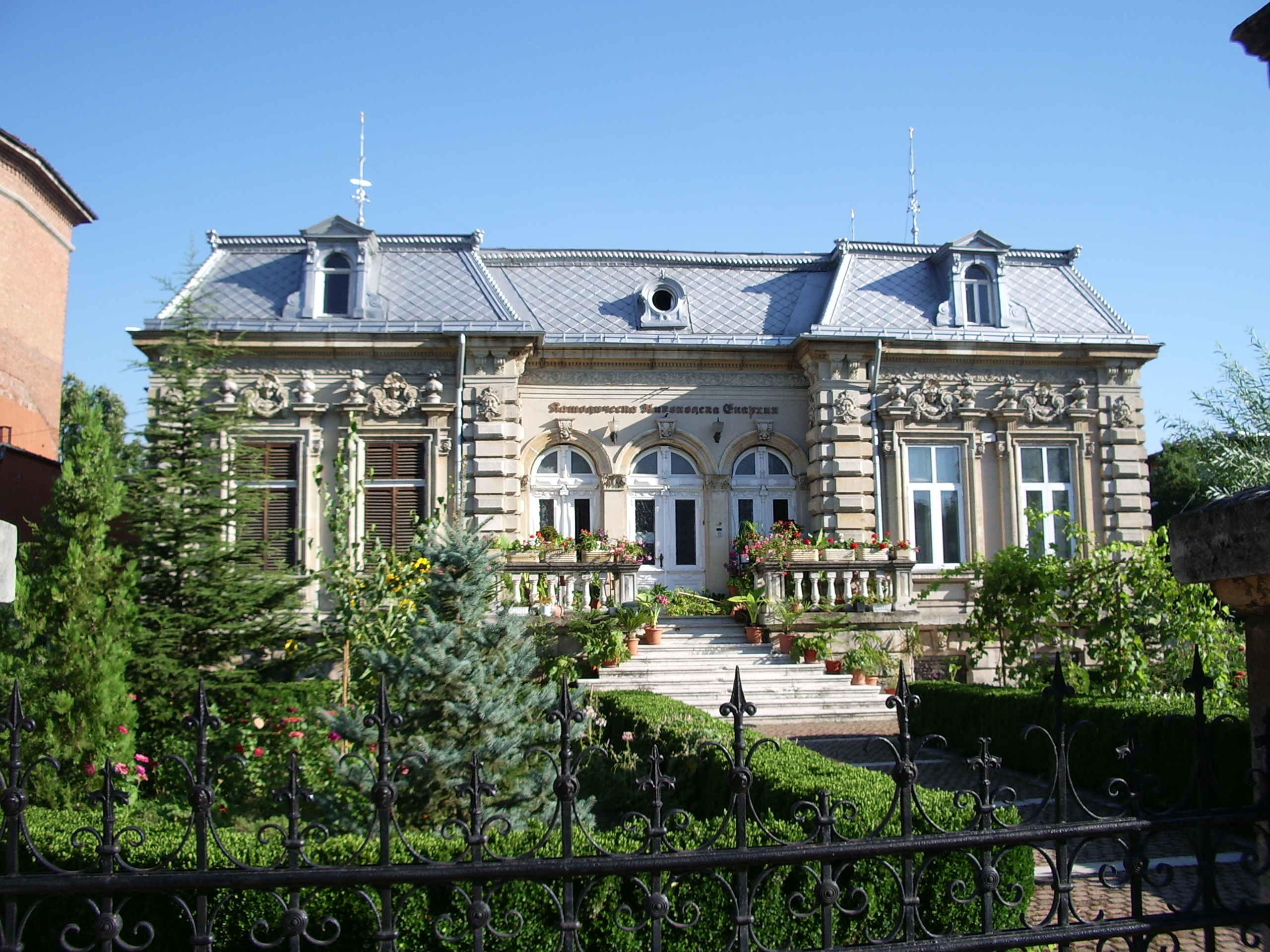
The Catholic Eparchy in Ruse

- Holy Trinity Cathedral
- Church of All Saints
- Church of the Holy Theotokos
- Church of St George
- Church of Holy Archangel Michael
- Church of the Holy Ascension
- Church of St Petka
- Church of St Nicholas the Miracle Worker
- Roman Catholic St Paul of the Cross Cathedral, built 1890
- Armenian Surp Astvadzadzin Church
- Evangelical Baptist church
- Evangelical Methodist Church
- Seid Pasha Mosque

In 1978, the "All Saints" Church was destroyed and the Pantheon of National Revival Heroes was built thereupon.

The Jewish community in Ruse built and consecrated a synagogue in 1797. It was destroyed in the 1810 fire, but two other synagogues were later built in 1826 and 1852.

== Economy ==
=== Economic activity ===
The average number of employees under labour contract in 2016 is 68 603 people, while the average annual salary – 4 683 euro, 60% higher compared to the 2007's statistics. The employment rate for people from the age of 15 to 64 is 57.7%, whereas the unemployment is 12.5%.

The relative share of the population aged between 25 and 64 years with higher education is 23.6%, 3% higher than in 2007. The relative share of the population aged between 25 and 64 years with secondary education is 57.5%, 3.2% higher than in 2007. 147 300 is the number of nights spent by tourists in 2013. The total number of enterprises is 10 830.

Share of enterprises by structure from the total number of enterprises
Year	2007	2008	2009	2010	2011	2012	2013
Share of enterprises with up to 9 persons employed	88.8 %	90.0 %	90.1 %	90.9 %	90.8 %	91.0 %	91.2 %
Share of enterprises with 10–49 persons employed	8.7 %	7.9 %	7.7 %	7.2 %	7.3 %	7.2 %	7.0 %
Share of enterprises with 50–249 persons employed	2.1 %	1.9 %	1.8 %	1.6 %	1.7 %	1.6 %	1.6 %
Share of enterprises with more than 249 persons employed	0.3 %	0.3 %	0.3 %	0.3 %	0.3 %	0.2 %	0.2 %

Foreign direct investment in non-financial enterprises for 2013 is 197 million euro. The total economic output, manufactured in the city is assessed at about 1.84 billion euro, while the revenue increases with 916 000 euro compared to 2007 – to 3.1 million euro for 2013.

=== Economic profile ===
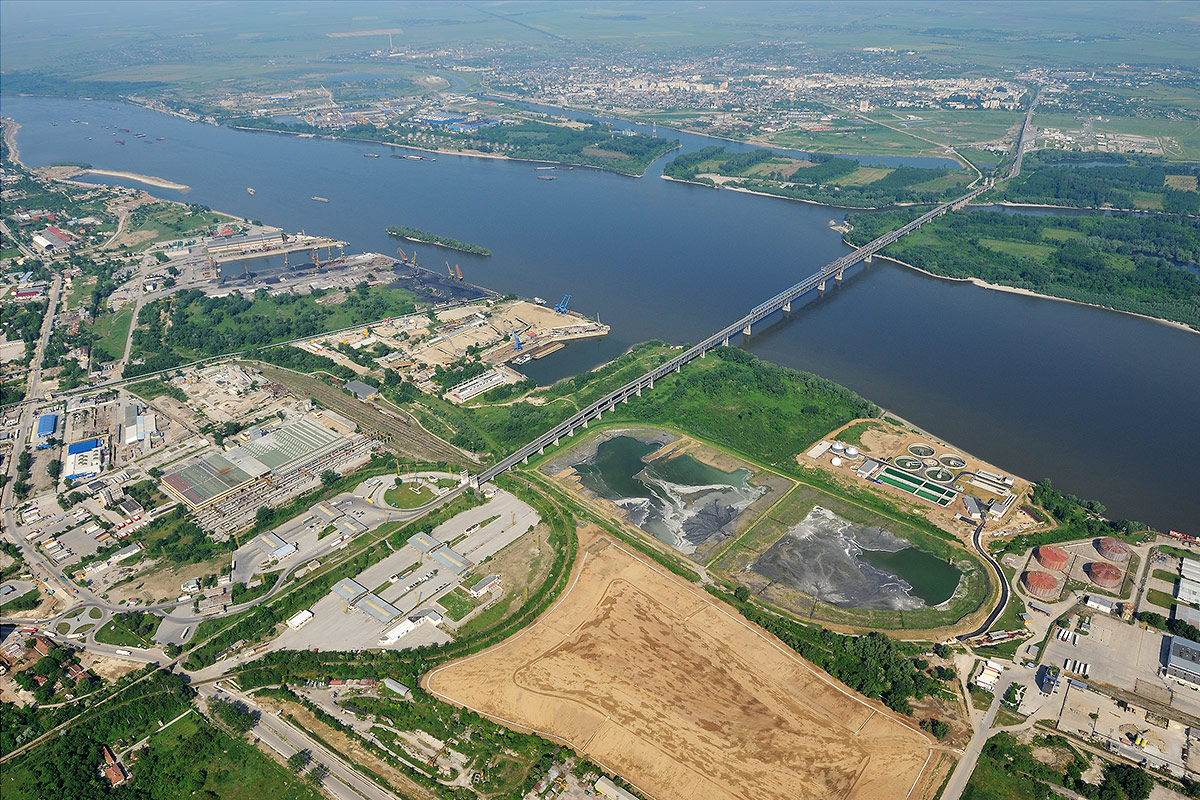
East Industrial Zone

Ruse is a large industrial centre. It has a duty-free zone and 2 industrial zones: East and West. Ruse Iztok Power Plant has an energy producing capacity of 400 MW and the Ruse West Power Plant has 41 MW. There are a logistics park and a business park in the city. The city's economy is dominated by light industry — tailoring, textiles and food processing. Big manufactures are Fazan (the first factory for socks in Bulgaria), Fenix 94 (socks), Ariston S (women's fashion), Bordo (women's fashion), Danini (lady's fashion), Top Man (men's fashion), Karina (lady's fashion) and Sirma Prista (dairy products). The petroleum industry and the chemical industry are represented by companies, producing paints and motor oils – Orgachim, Prista Oil, Lubrica, Megachim, EKON 91, Ninachim and Polysan. The machinery industry and ships construction are well developed. Also, one of the world's leading companies in yacht design Vripack has an architecture and engineering studio in Ruse.

There are 65 hotels and 1,769 beds in Ruse. The income from accommodations for the fourth quarter of 2011 г. is 1,661,294 lv.

== Transportation ==
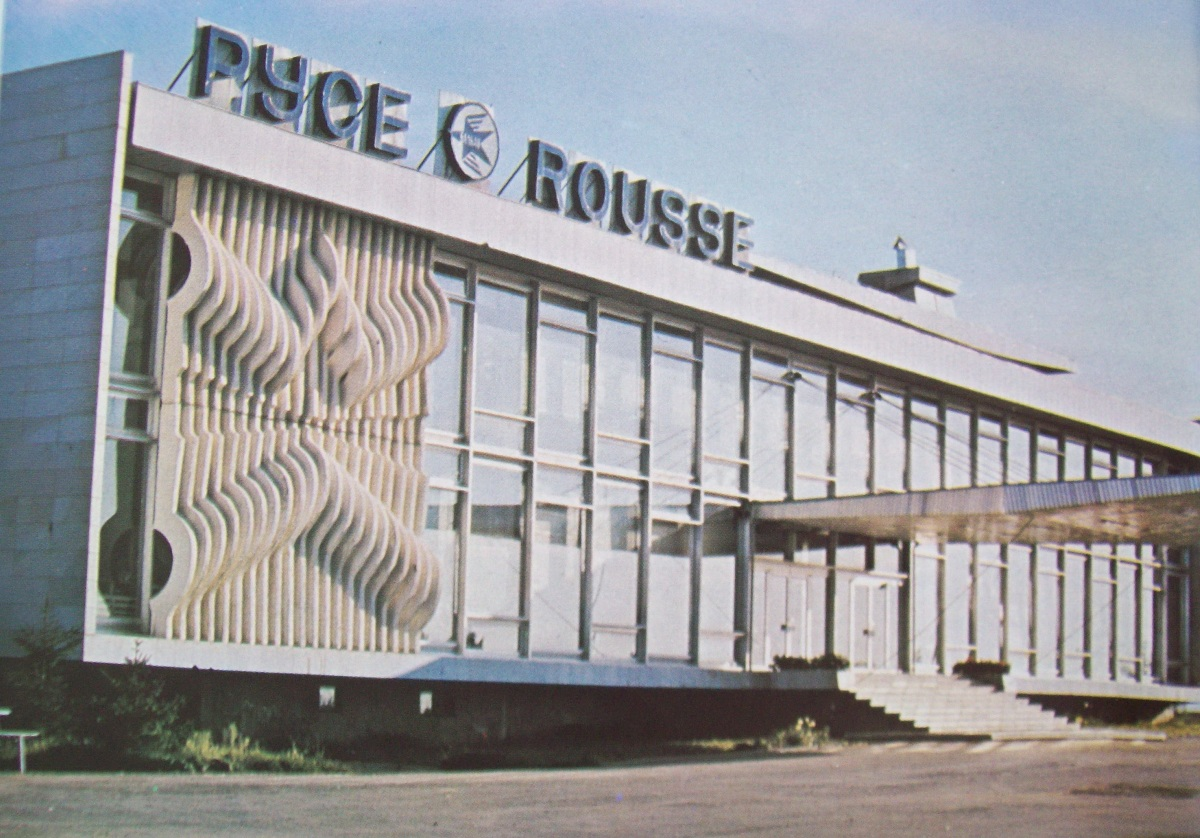
Ruse Airport

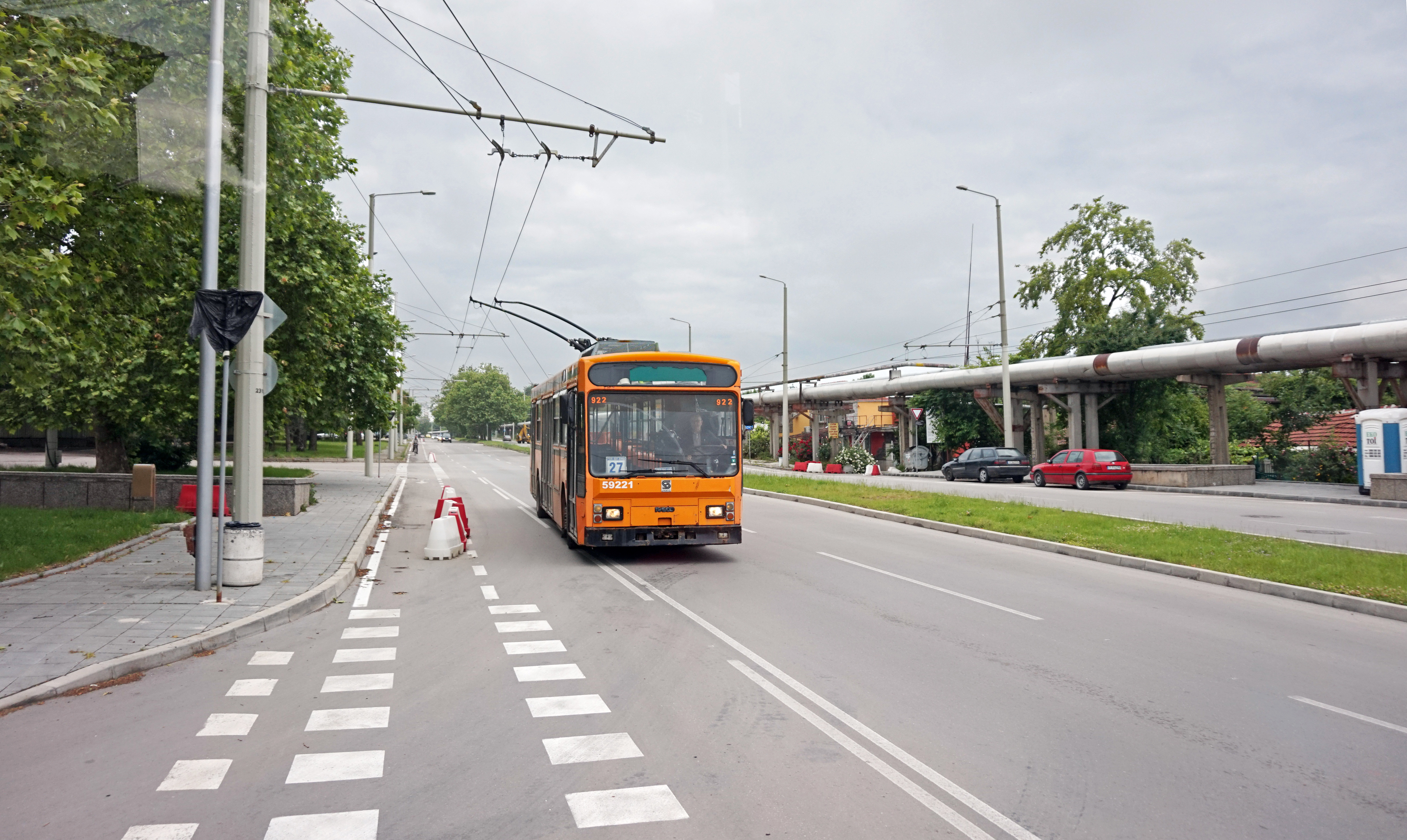
A trolleybus in Ruse

Ruse is a major road and railway hub in Northern Bulgaria. Railway transportation in the city dates back to 1867 when it became a station of the first railway line in Bulgaria Ruse – Varna. There are railways to Southern Bulgaria, Sofia, Varna and Bucharest. Ruse has two railway stations for passenger services (Ruse Central and Ruse Razpredelitelna) and two for freight transport services. There are intercity buses that link Ruse with cities and towns all over the country, as well as in other European nations. They are based in two bus stations: South and East.

Ruse has an extensive public transport system with 25 bus and trolleybus lines, including the Ruse trolleybus system. Since the sale of all shares of the private Israeli transport holding Egged Ruse to the local municipality in 2017, trolleybus lines have been operated by the city's own public transport entity. Since July 2024, urban bus lines are also operated by the municipal public transport entity. Suburban bus lines remain under concession to various private Bulgarian transport companies. A 14 kilometer bicycle network along the main boulevards of the city has been developed and is currently in the process of expansion.

Approximately 17 kilometres (11 miles) southeast of Ruse is the village of Shtraklevo, near which is the former military and passenger Ruse Airport. It is owned by the municipality of Ruse, with an active license for small passenger and cargo flights (license issued on 21.12.2016). The runway is long enough for Boeing 747s (Jumbo Jets). The Henri Coandă International Airport in Otopeni, Romania is 80 kilometres (50 miles) north of Ruse.

The Danube bridge is located east of Ruse. It was the only road and rail bridge between Bulgaria and Romania until the opening of a second bridge crossing to Romania on 14 June 2013 at Vidin.

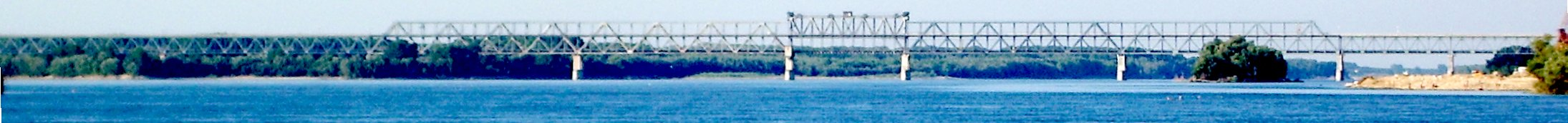
The Friendship Bridge, connecting Bulgaria with Romania

Ruse is the biggest Bulgarian port on the banks of the Danube. After the opening of the Rhine–Main–Danube Canal which covers 3,500 km (2,175 mi) and connects 13 European countries with Asia via the Black Sea, the river becomes the longest inland waterway on the planet. This key position has determined the 19th century-long co-existence of different cultures and religions in Ruse.

== Education ==
There is one university in Ruse – "Angel Kanchev" University of Ruse with a capacity of 15 000 students. The university's structure includes a subsidiaries in Silistra, Vidin and Razgrad. There is also a subsidiary of the College of Agriculture – Plovdiv in the city.

The city hosts 26 high schools, among which is the English Language School "Geo Milev".

== Demographics ==
Historical population
Year	Pop.	±%
1887	27,194	—
1900	32,712	+20.3%
1910	36,255	+10.8%
1934	41,447	+14.3%
1946	53,523	+29.1%
1956	83,453	+55.9%
1965	128,888	+54.4%
1975	159,578	+23.8%
1985	183,746	+15.1%
1992	170,038	−7.5%
2001	161,453	−5.0%
2011	149,642	−7.3%
2021	124,787	−16.6%
2024	121,168	−2.9%

Ruse is the sixth largest city in Bulgaria by population. It was the most populated city of Bulgaria in 1880 with 26,163 people.

The number of the residents of the city (not the municipality) reached its peak around 1990, numbering almost 200,000. According to the 2024 official estimate, Ruse was inhabited by 121,168 people within the city limits, while the Ruse Municipality along with the legally affiliated adjacent villages had 137,159 inhabitants.

=== Migration ===
Migration in and out of the city
Year	2010	2011	2012	2013
New residents	3670	2261	2163	2333
Out-migration	3798	2093	2188	2250
Total	-128	168	-25	83

=== Ethnic, linguistic and religious composition ===
According to the latest 2011 census data, the individuals declared their ethnic identity were distributed as follows:

- Bulgarians: 123 469 (90.4%)
- Turks: 10 128 (7.5%)
- Romani: 1,297 (0.9%)
- Others: 1,132 (0.8%)
- Indefinable: 618 (0.5%)
  - Undeclared: 12,998 (8.7%)

According to the first census in 1883, the ethnic composition was as follows:

- Bulgarians: 11,342
- Turks: 10,252
- Jews: 1,943
- Armenians: 841
- Germans: 476
- Greeks: 291
- Vlachs (Romanians): 231
- Russians: 170
- Serbs and Croats: 113
- 79 Romani, 76 Hungarians, 74 Tatars, 58 Italians, 58 French people, 32 English people, 19 Persians, 16 Poles, 16 Czechs, and 69 others.

Total: 26,156

== International relations ==
=== Consulates ===
- Mongolia – Honorary Consulate
- Ukraine – Honorary Consulate

=== Twin towns and sister cities ===
Ruse is twinned with:

- Bijeljina, Bosnia and Herzegovina
- Giurgiu, Romania
- Huainan, China
- Peristeri, Greece
- Saint-Ouen-sur-Seine, France
- Trogir, Croatia
- Újbuda (Budapest), Hungary
- Volgograd, Russia

=== Honours ===
Ruse Peak (800 m) on Livingston Island in the South Shetland Islands, Antarctica is named after the city.

== Notable residents ==
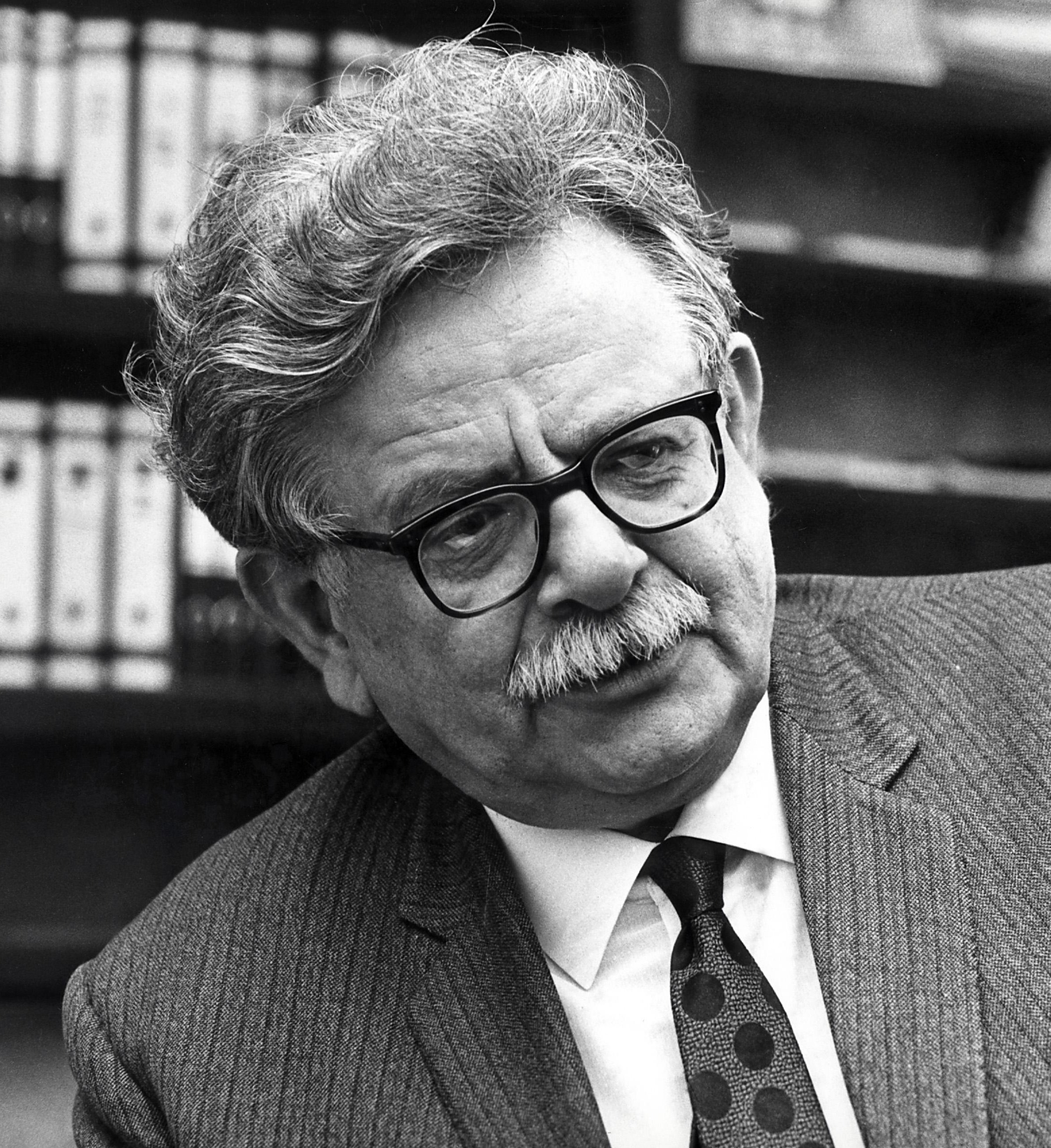
Elias Canetti, winner of the 1981 Nobel Prize for Literature.

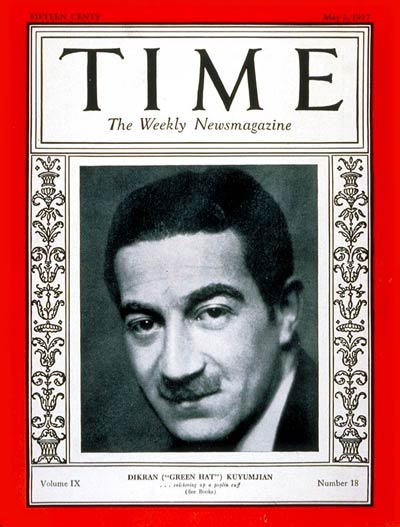
Michael Arlen, author. Known for his book The Green Hat, which was the inspiration for the Oscar-nominated movie A Woman of Affairs (1928).

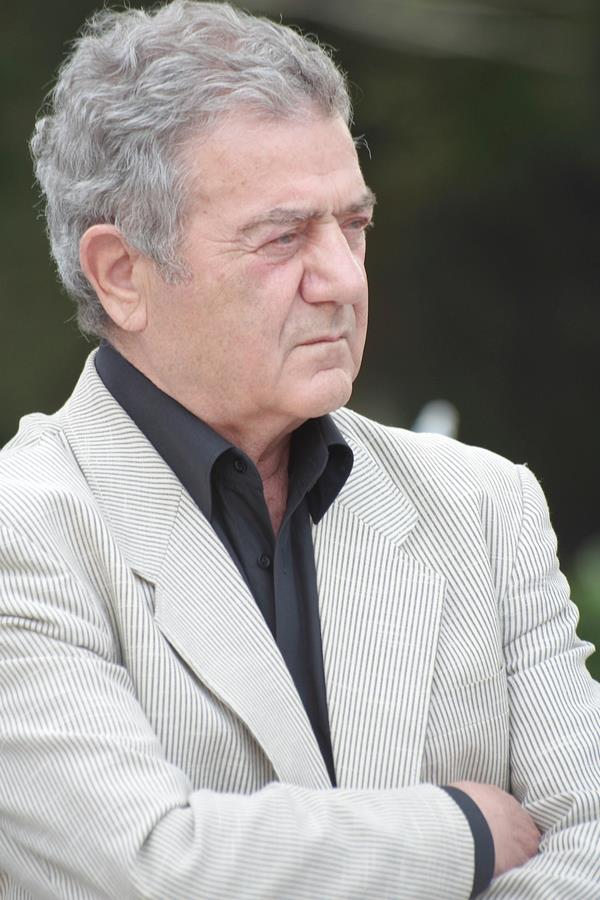
Stefan Tsanev, a contemporary writer, known for his essays, plays, poems and historical novels.

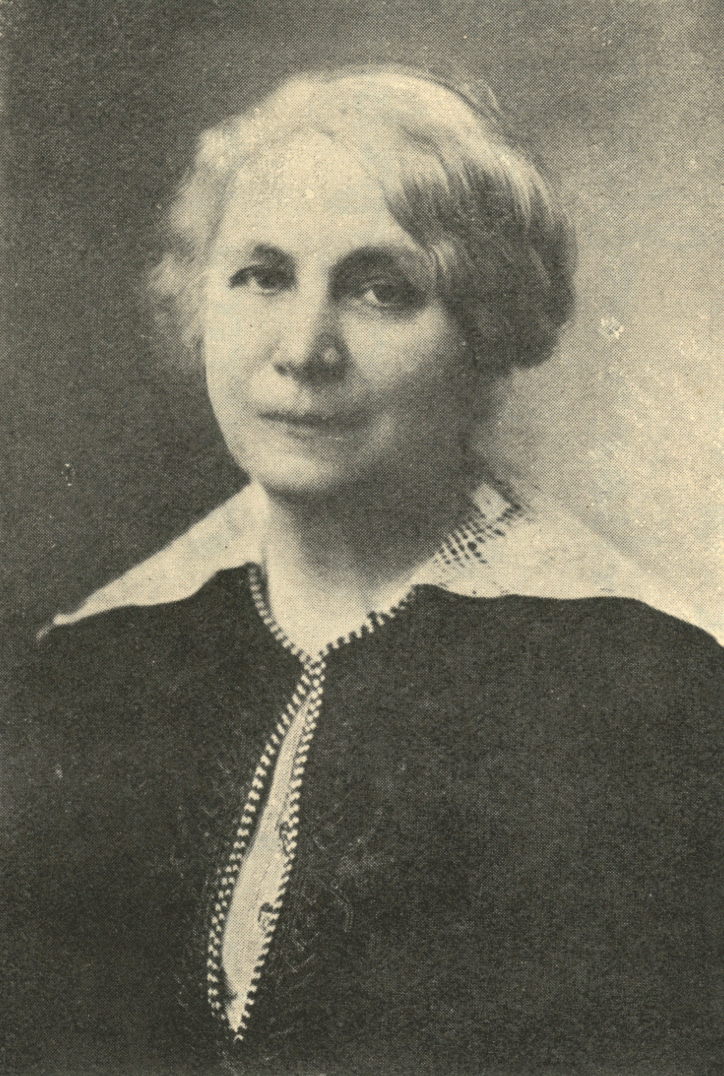
Ekaterina Karavelova, female rights activist and founder of the Bulgarian Women's Union.

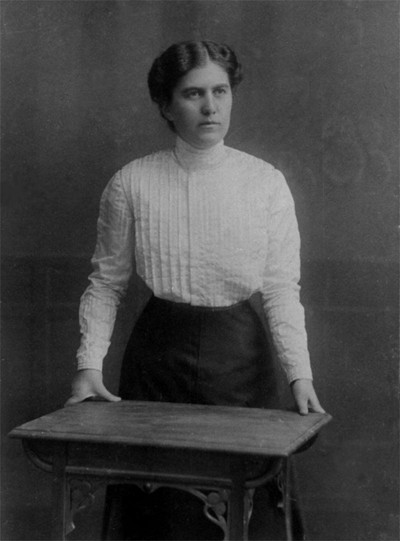
Dimitrana Ivanova, an education reformer, suffragist and women's rights activist. Chairperson of the Bulgarian Women's Union from 1926 to 1944.

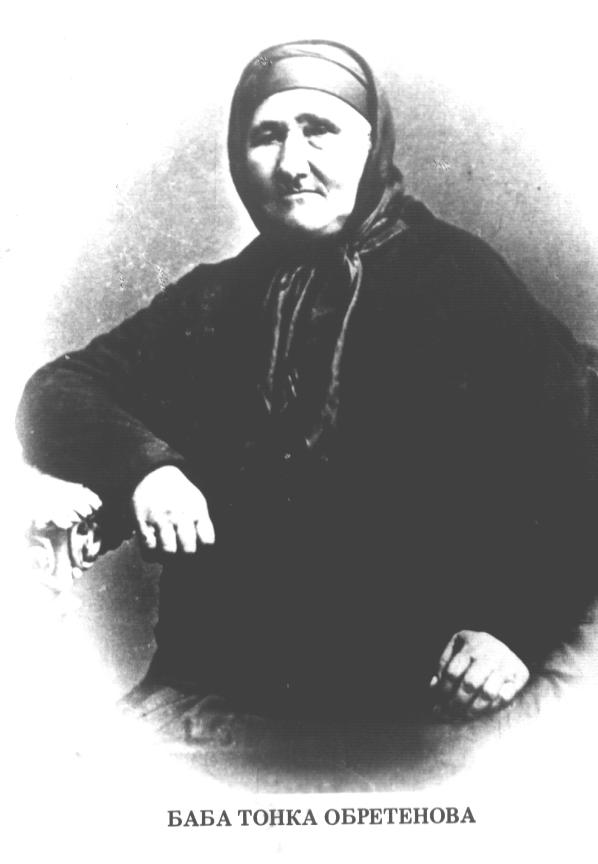
Tonka Obretenova, 19th-century revolutionary.

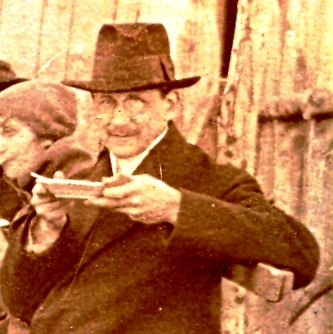
Venelin Ganev, a lawyer, diplomat, and politician. One of the regents of underage tsar Simeon II.

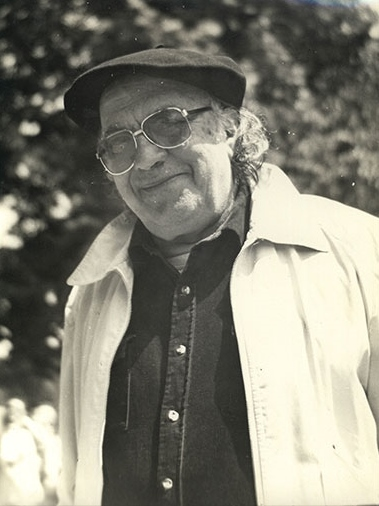
Zahari Zhandov, film director, scriptwriter and cinematographer.

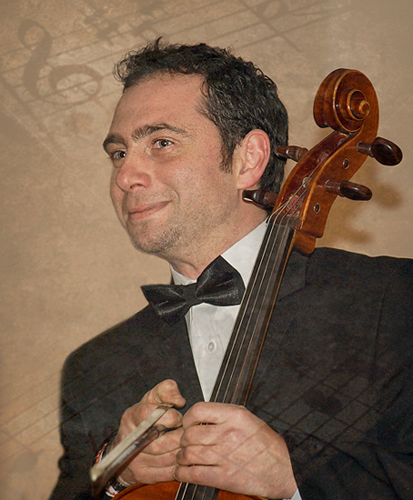
Konstantin Evtimov, a cellist, performed as a soloist in the London Philharmonic Orchestra, the Bern, Graz, Sofia and Lausanne Symphonic Orchestras.

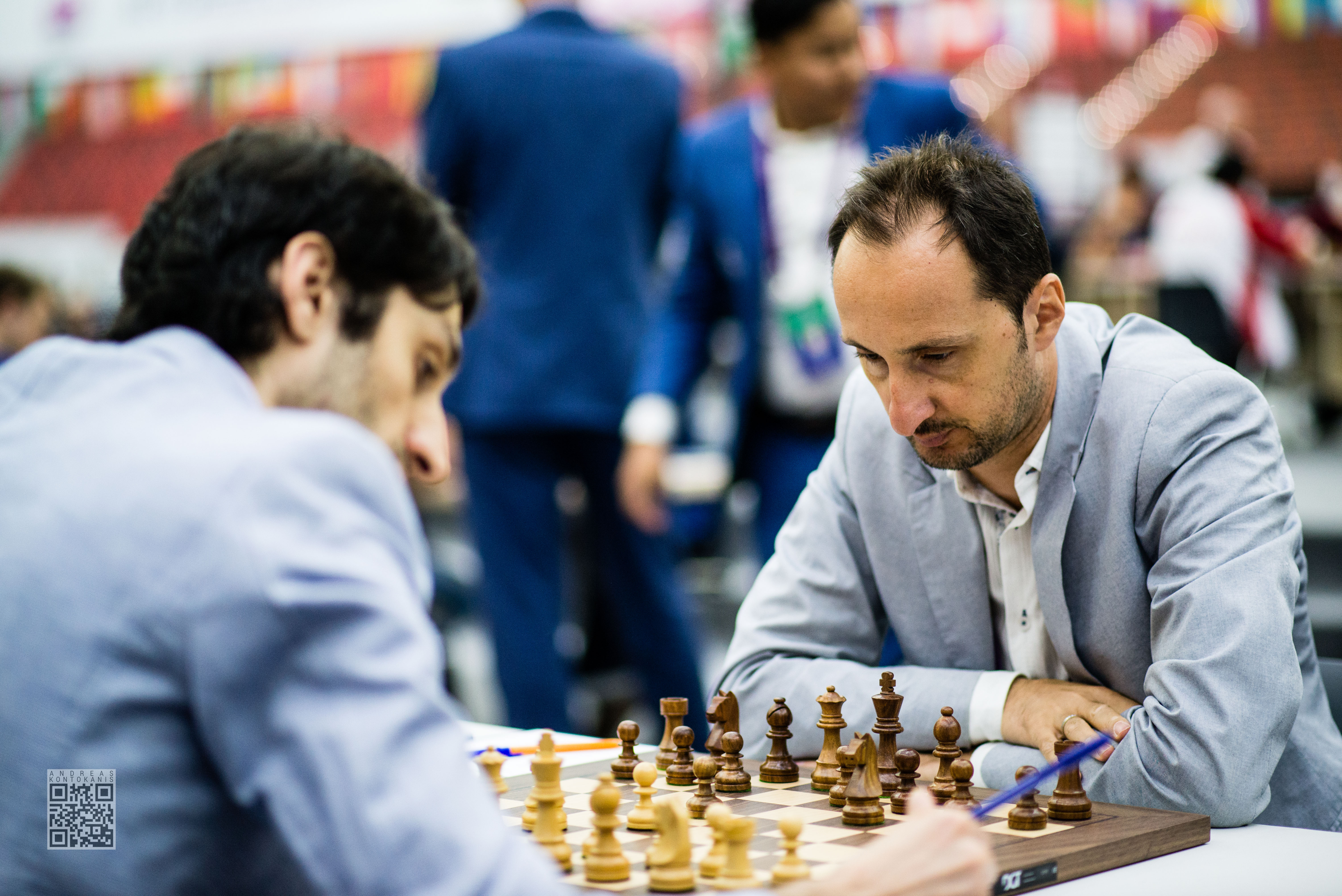
Veselin Topalov, chess grandmaster and FIDE World Chess Champion from 2005 to 2006 and Vice Chess Champion from 2010 to 2012.

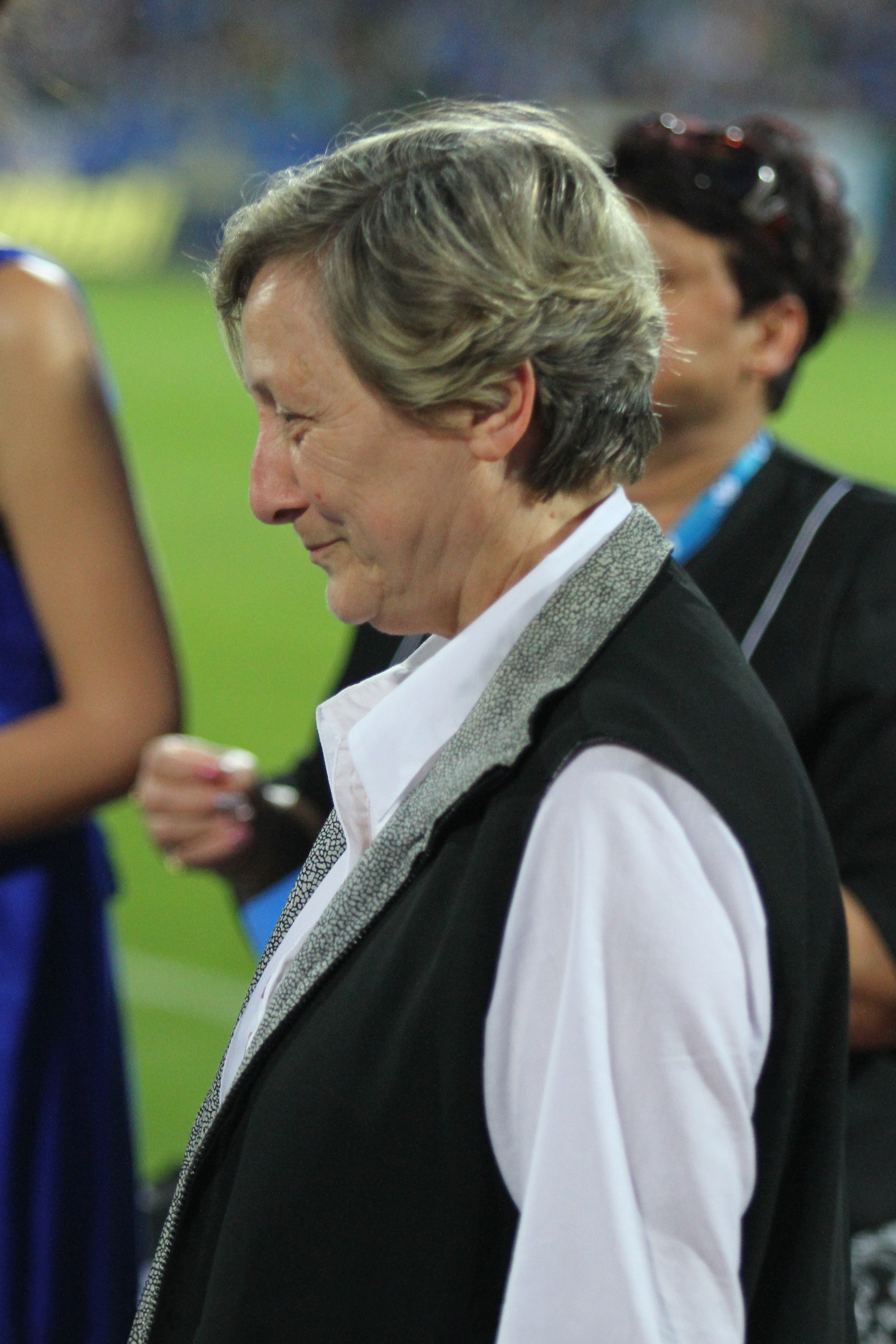
Neshka Robeva, rhythmic gymnast and coach. Notable for the “Golden Girls of Bulgaria", having won medals in European, World and Olympic championships.

=== Honorary citizens ===
The following table lists people awarded the title of honorary citizen of Ruse.

Name	Year	Field / reason
Dmitri Shostakovich	1965	Culture
Tikhon Khrennikov	1965	Culture
Mihail Arnaudov	1968	Science
Hachik Mihranyan	1996	Culture
Mihail Angelov	1996	Culture
Milko Kazanov	1996	Sport
Krasimira Koldamova	1998	Culture
Georgi Bogdanov	1998	Culture
Diana Yorgova		Sport
Emil Tabakov	1998	Culture
Vasil Kazandzhiev	1999	Culture
Iliya Temkov	2000	Culture
Mihail Katev	2000	Culture
Iosif Conta	2000	Culture
Veselin Topalov	2000	Sport
Ivan Donev	2001	Culture
Silvi Stamboliev	2001	Culture
Rafail Goranov	2001	Sport
Theodoros Dimitrakopoulos	2002	Mayor of Peristeri, Greece
Minko Minkov	2003	Culture
Mariya Mateeva	2003	Culture
Metropolitan Neofit	2004	Culture
Evgeniy Nazarov	2004	Medicine; posthumous
Anton Petrov	2004	Soldier killed in Karbala; posthumous
Stefan Vachev	2005	Culture; posthumous
Georgi Deliganev	2005	Culture
Petar Petrov – Parcheto	2005	Culture
Yuri Bashmet	2005	Culture
Lucian Iliescu	2005	Mayor of Giurgiu, Romania
Apostol Arnaudov	2005	Education; posthumous
Svetoslav Popov	2005	Medicine
Elias Canetti	2005	Culture; posthumous
Konstantin Iliev	2006	Culture; posthumous
Svetlin Rusev	2006	Culture
Kiril Stanchev	2006	Culture; posthumous
Lilyan Lazarov	2006	Business; posthumous
Meglena Kuneva	2006	Politics
Zdravko Kisyov	2007	Literature and translation
Mihail Mihaylov	2007	Medicine; posthumous
Itzhak / Ziko Graziani	2007	Culture; posthumous
Leon Daniel	2007	Culture
Ventsislav Nikolov	2007	Culture
Svetozar Panayotov	2008	Architecture
Boris Katsarov	2008	Law
Petranka Yoncheva	2008	Law
Geno Genov	2008	Business; posthumous
Atanas Mitkov	2008	Science
Dimitar Kalchev	2008	Former mayor of Ruse; posthumous
Boris Panov	2008	Law
Yavor Hristov	2009	Sport
Mincho Minchev	2010	Culture
Mimi Nikolova	2010	Culture
Andrey Mednikarov	2011	Culture
Aleksandar Doganov	2011	Medicine; posthumous
Georgi Bozhkov	2012	Sport
Vasil Parvanov	2012	Culture
Ignat Kaneff	2013	Business and philanthropy
Dimitar Gramatikov	2013	Medicine; posthumous
Hristo Beloev	2014	Science
Teodorin Patrikov	2014	Construction and philanthropy
Vladimir Vitkov	2014	Science
Vanyo Mitev	2014	Medicine
Vili Ikonomov	2014	Culture
Valentin Donev	2014	Soldier; posthumous
Samuil Refetoff	2014	Science
Angel Penchev	2015	Sport
Svetozar Dimitrov / Zmey Goryanin	2015	Culture
Nayden Todorov	2015	Culture
Georgi Achev	2016	Sport
Tanko Serafimov	2016	Architecture
Plamen Bobokov	2016	
Neshka Robeva	2016	Sport
Vanyo Tanov	2016	Security; posthumous
Rumyana Tsenkova	2016	Science
Tsvyatko Milanov	2017	Notary; posthumous
Vladimir Koylazov	2017	Technology
Plamen Monev	2017	Culture; posthumous
Tsonka Bukurova, Todorka Bobeva, Stefka Monova and Albena Velkova; posthumously Evgeniya Zheleva, Vyara Georgieva and Mariya Varamezova	2018	
Svetlin Rusev	2018	Culture
Iva Chavdarova	2020	Culture
Ivan Tomov	2020	Sport; posthumous
Lili Gancheva	2023	Contribution to Ruse Municipality and Bulgarian–Romanian cooperation
Anelia Nuneva	2023	Sport
Antoniy Todorov	2023	Children's choral education; posthumous
Nikolay Nikolov-Ruschukliev	2023	Visual arts
Ilko Petrov	2023	Music
Tsveti Rusinov	2023	Architecture, philanthropy and public activity; posthumous
Iliya Syarov	2024	Boxing coach
Naum, Metropolitan of Ruse	2024	Spiritual life of the local community
Margarita Trifonova	2026	Journalism
Kiril Panayotov	2026	Medicine, science and public activity; posthumous
Plamen Velikov	2026	Entrepreneurship, culture and social activity; posthumous

== Gallery ==
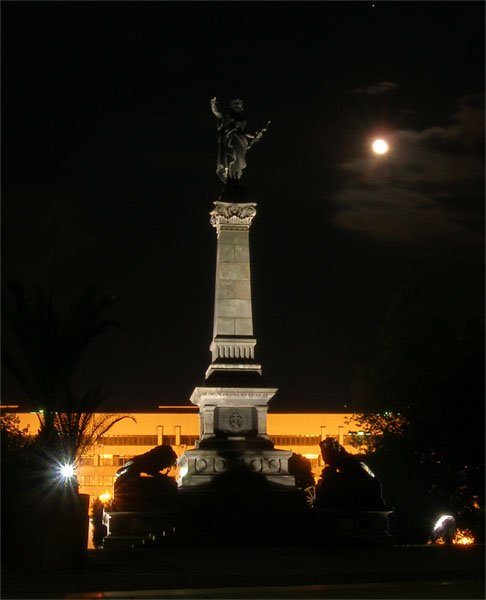
Statue of Liberty at night

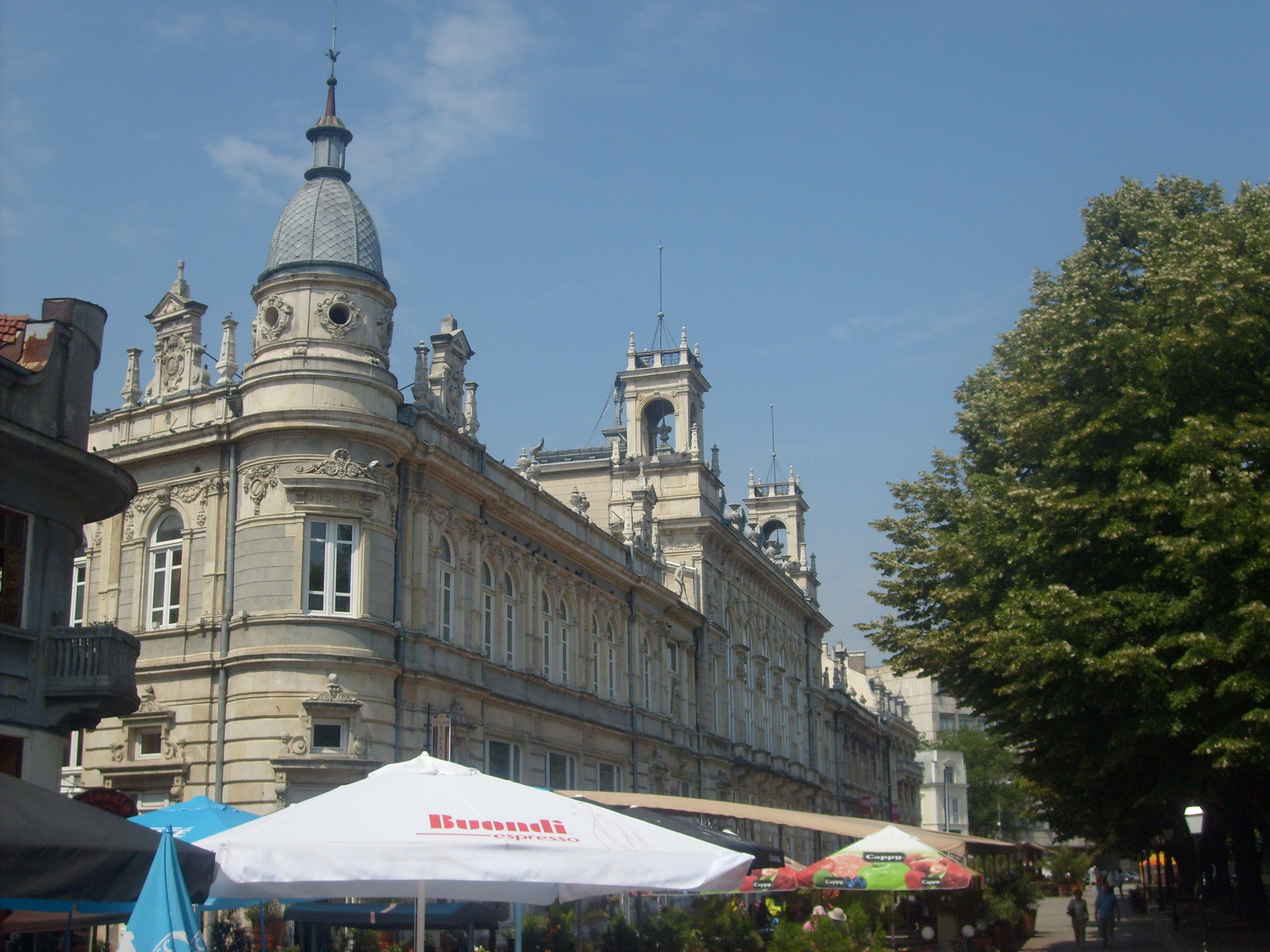

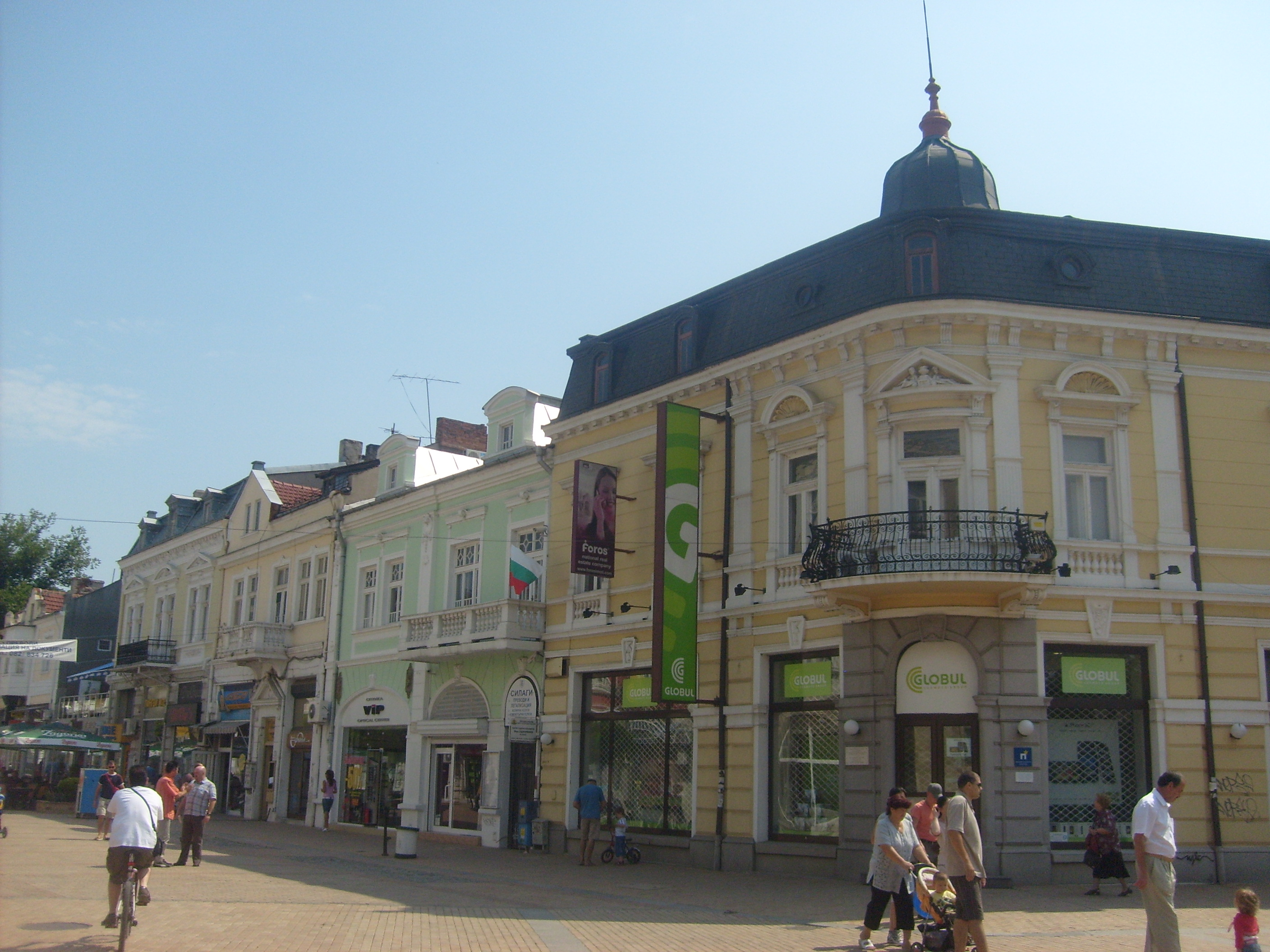

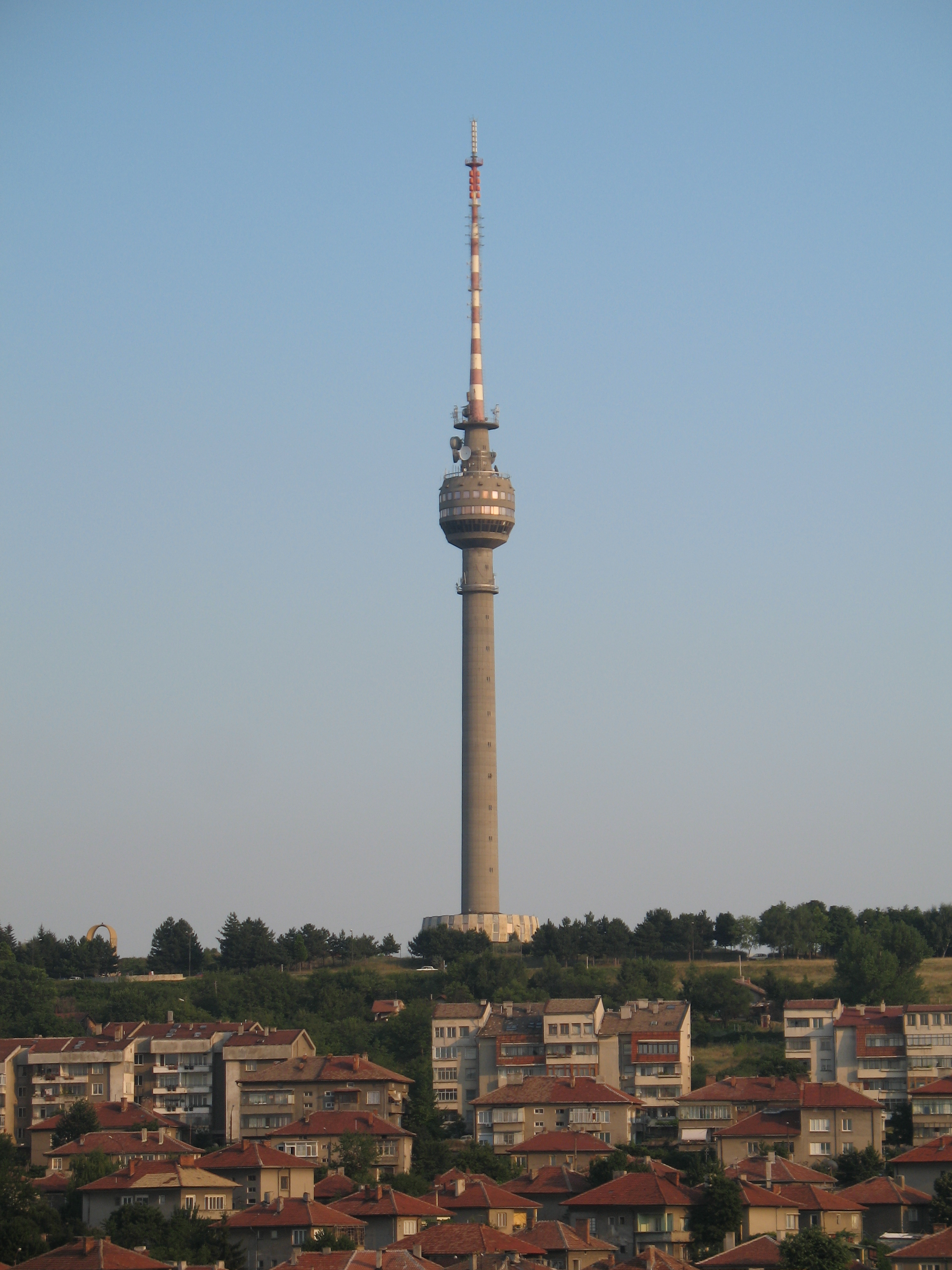
The Rousse TV Tower as seen from the city

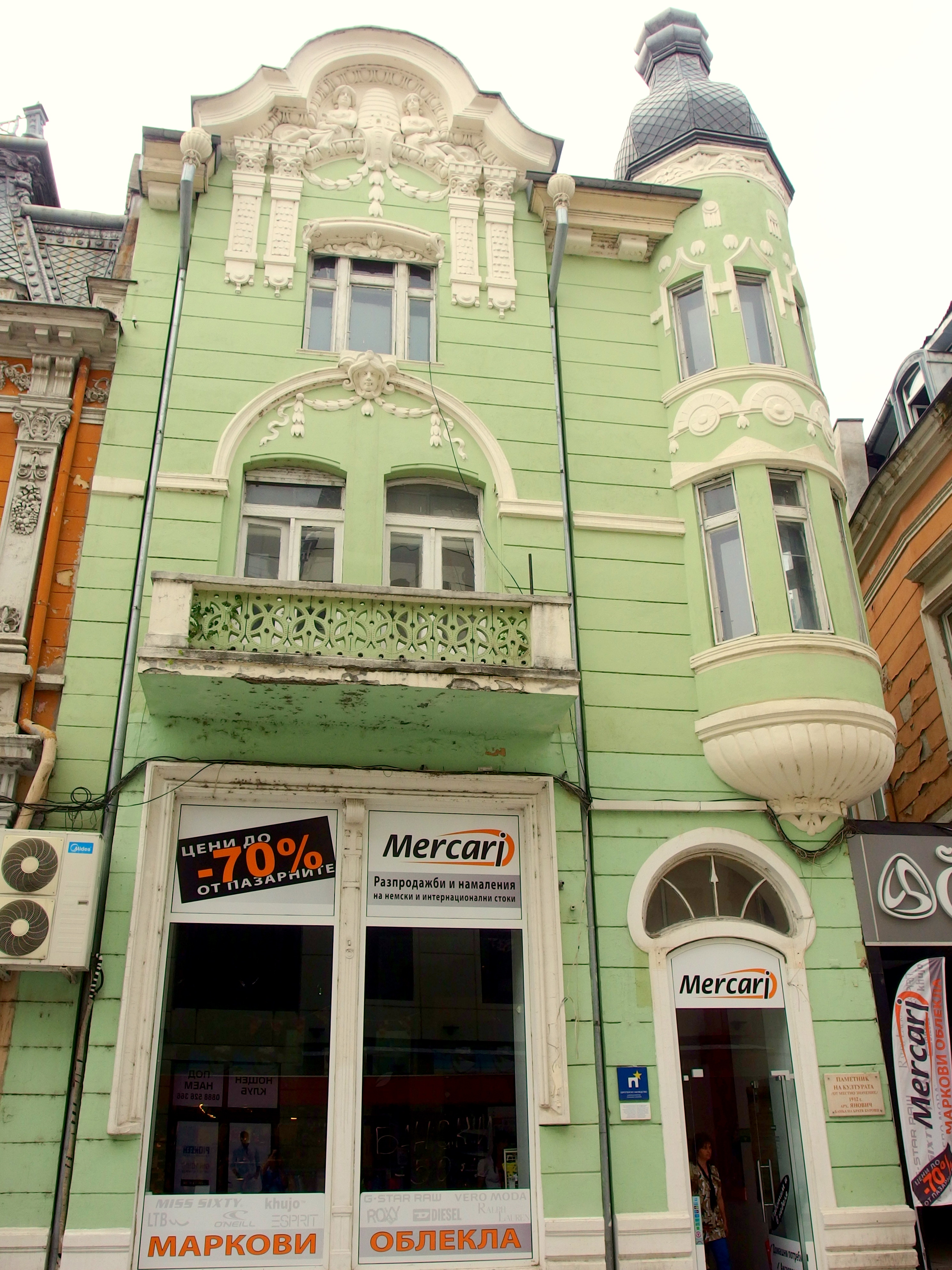

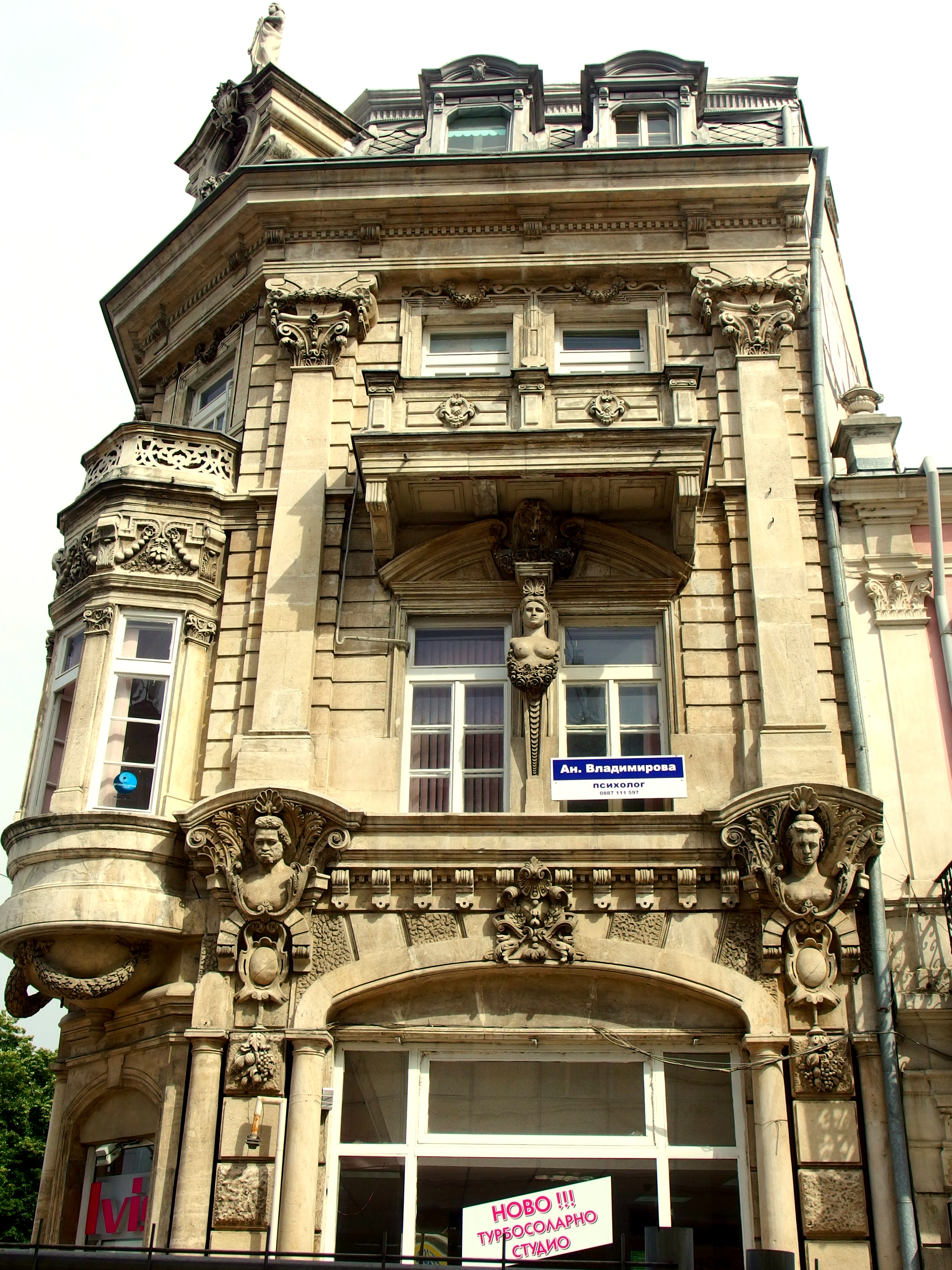

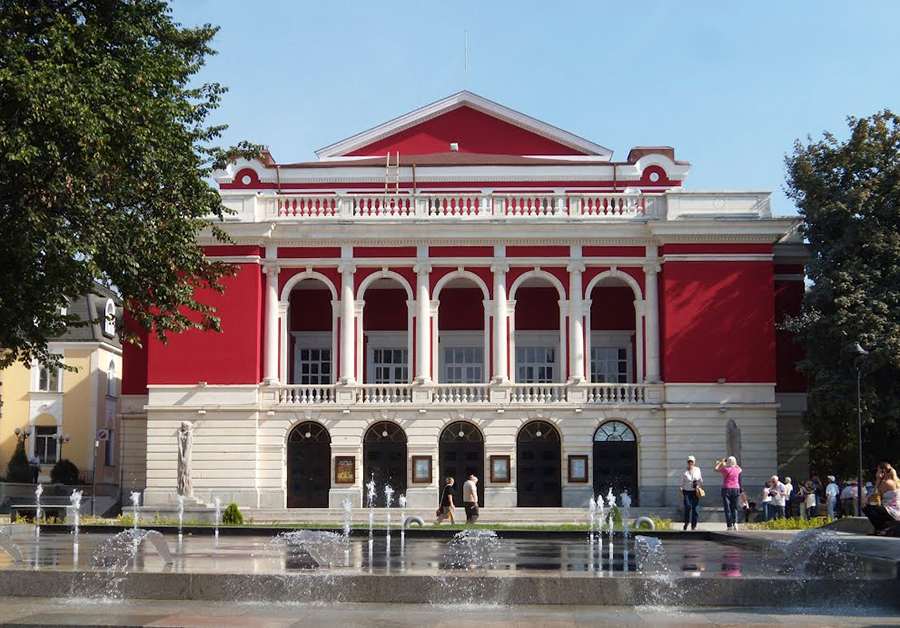
The opera-house

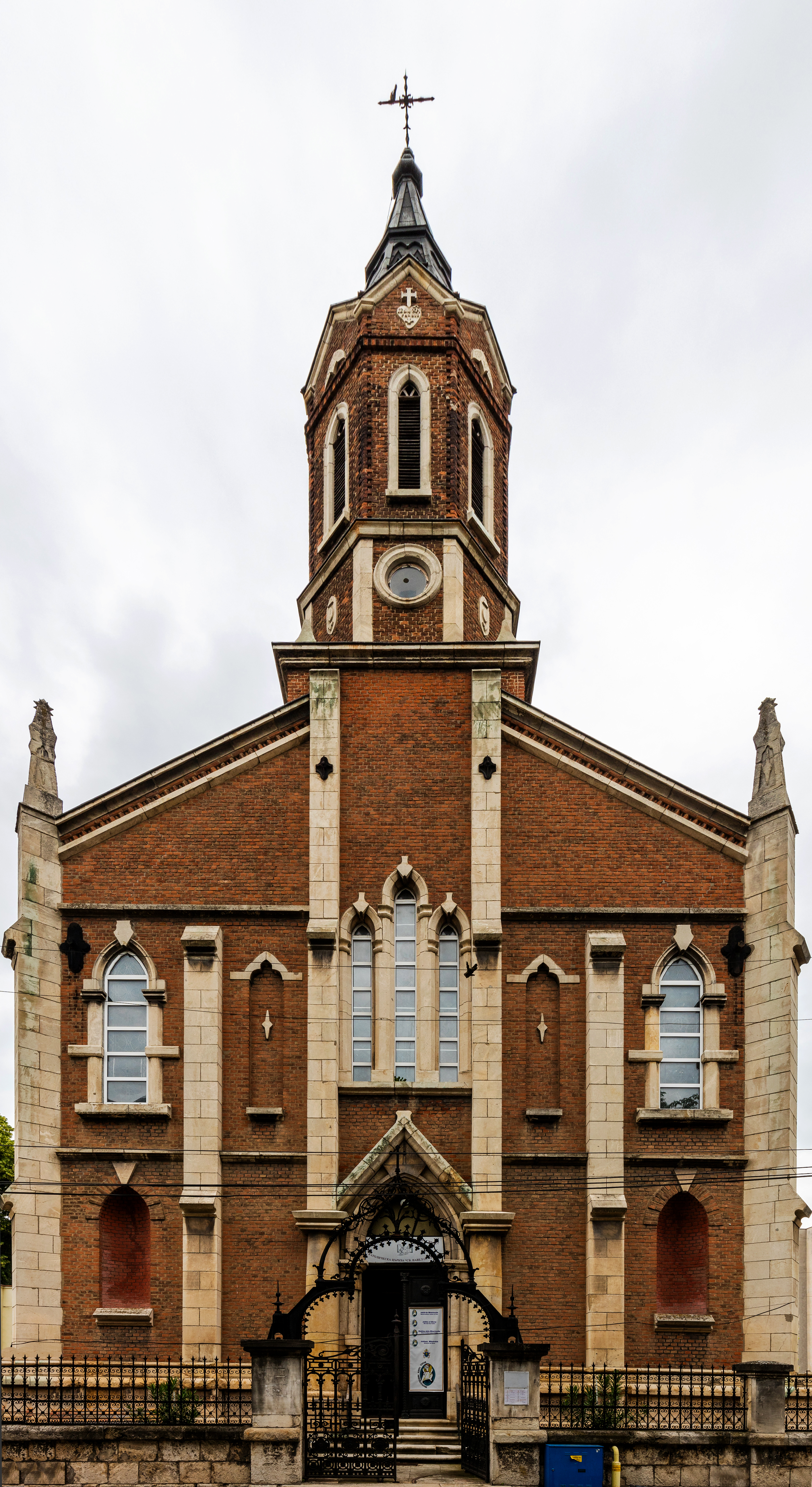
The Roman Catholic St Paul of the Cross Cathedral (1890)

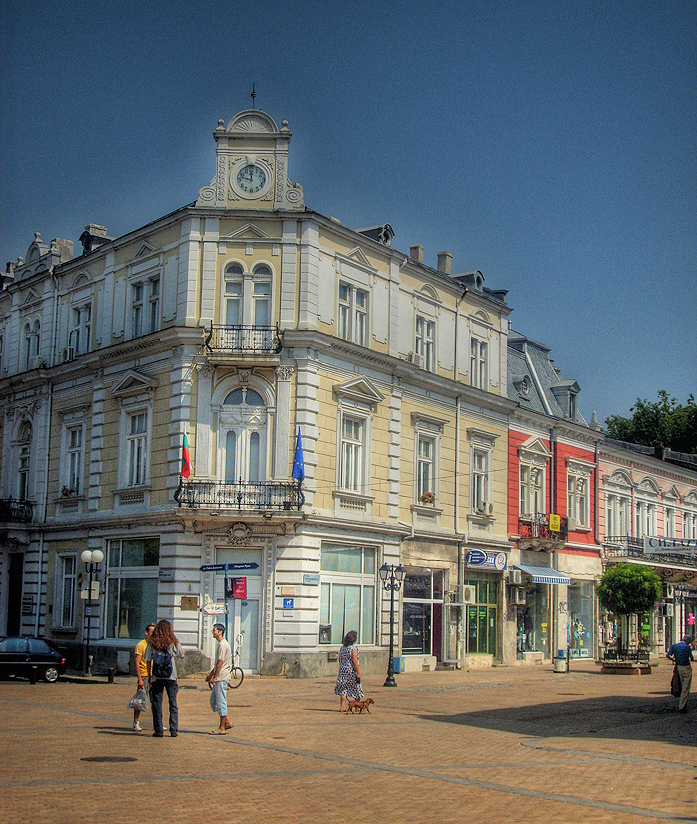

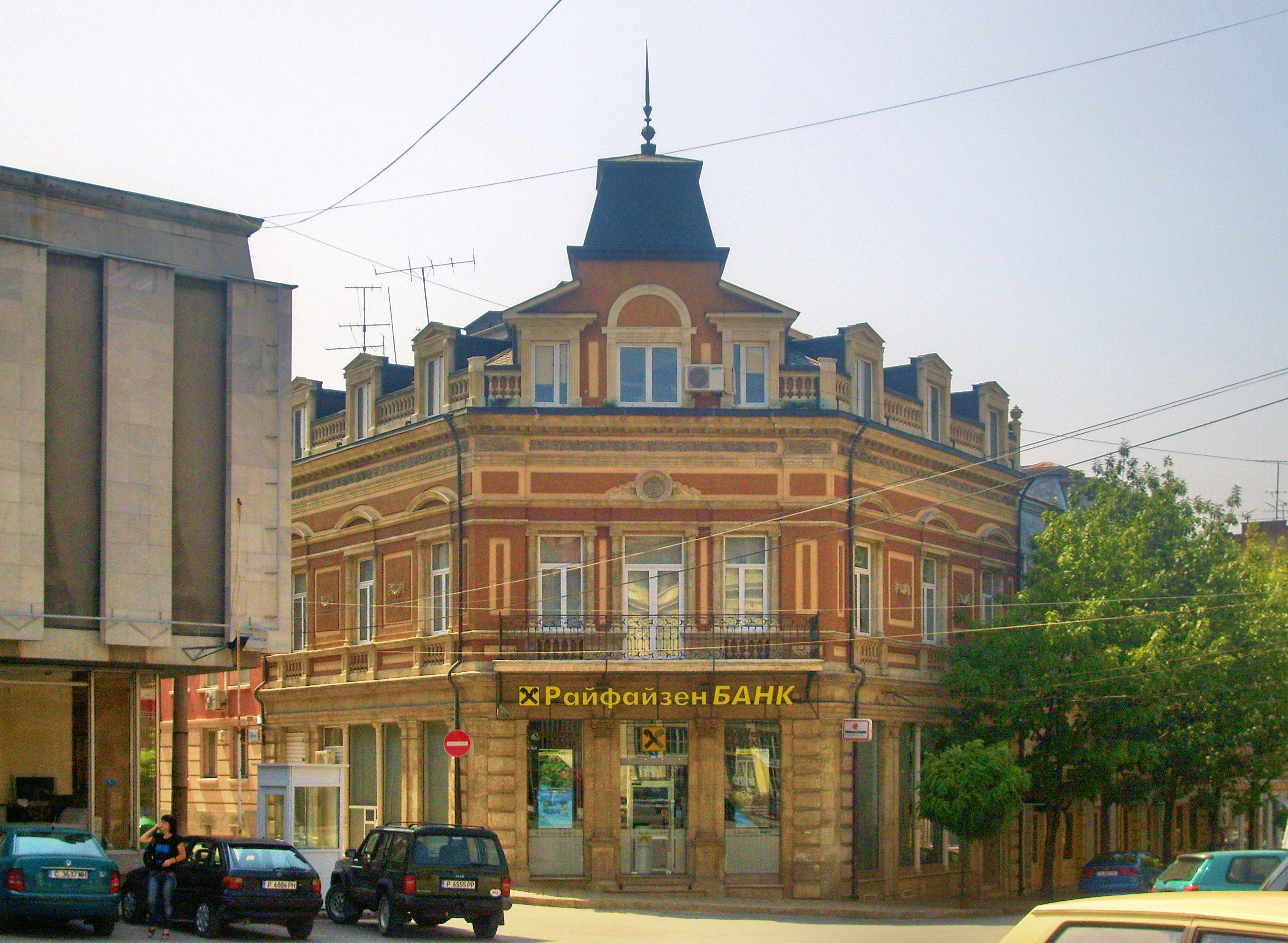

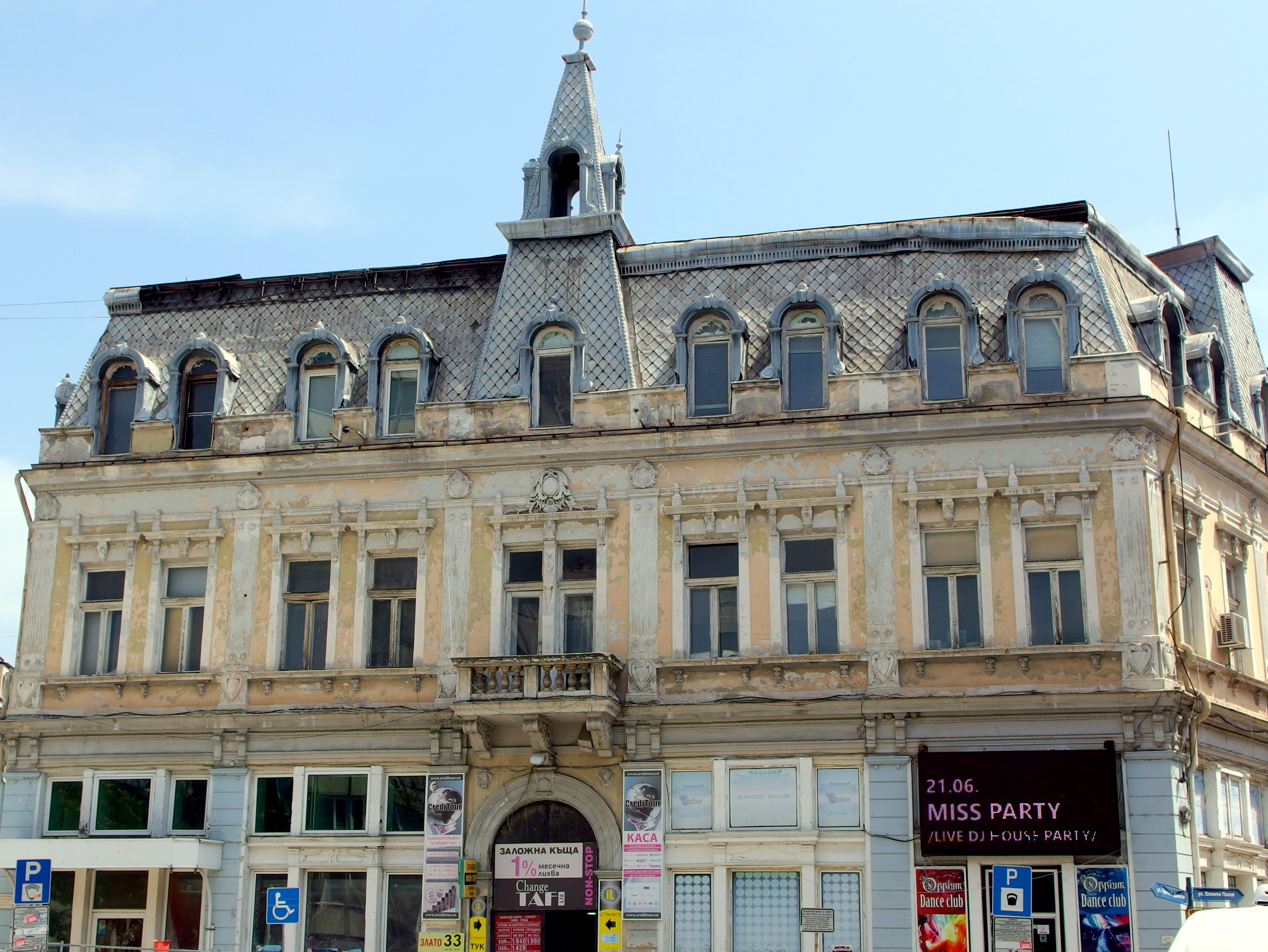

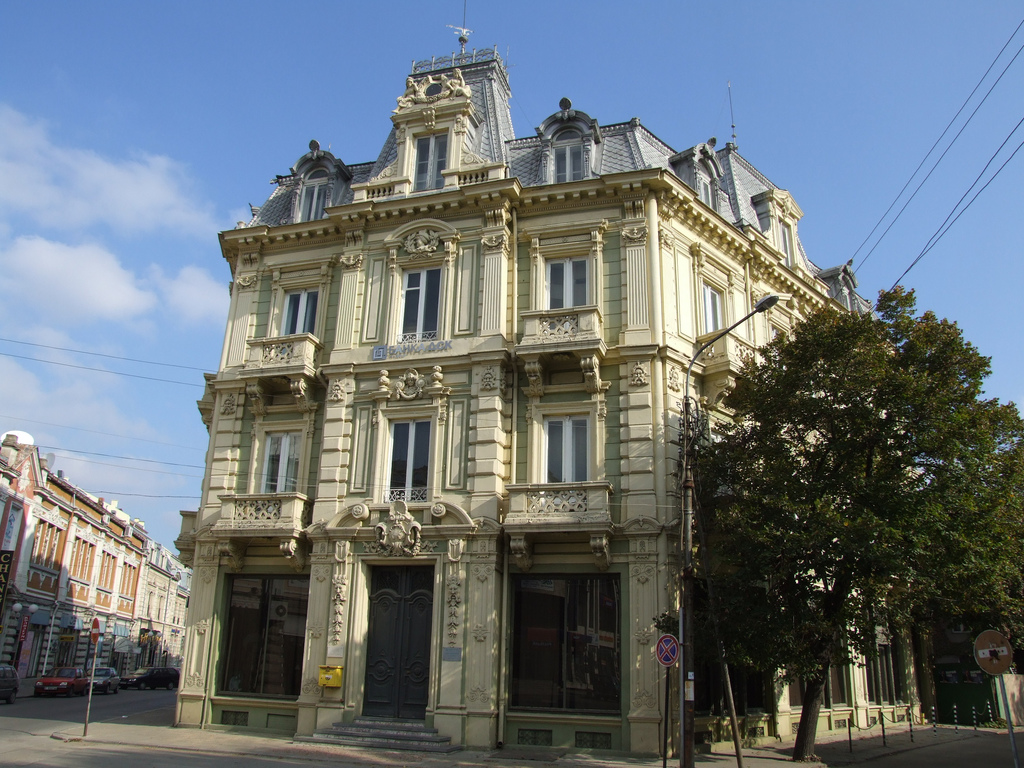

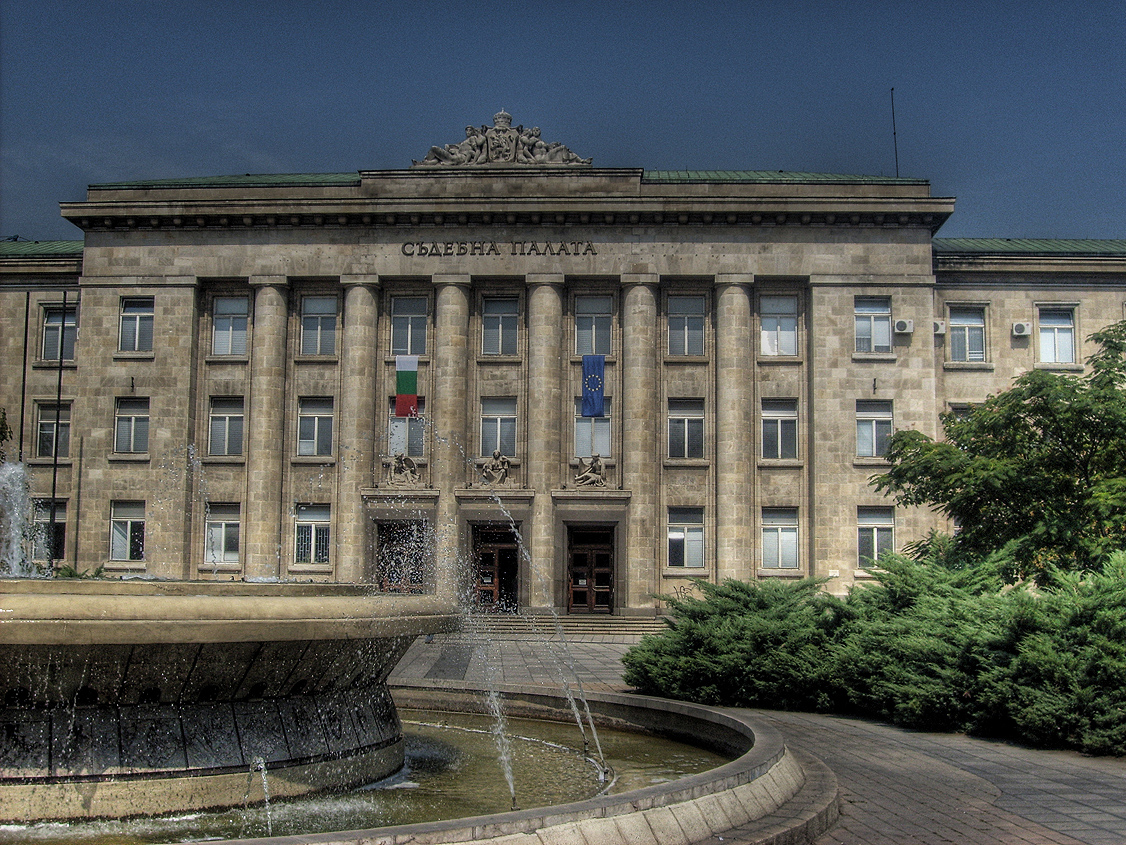
The Court House

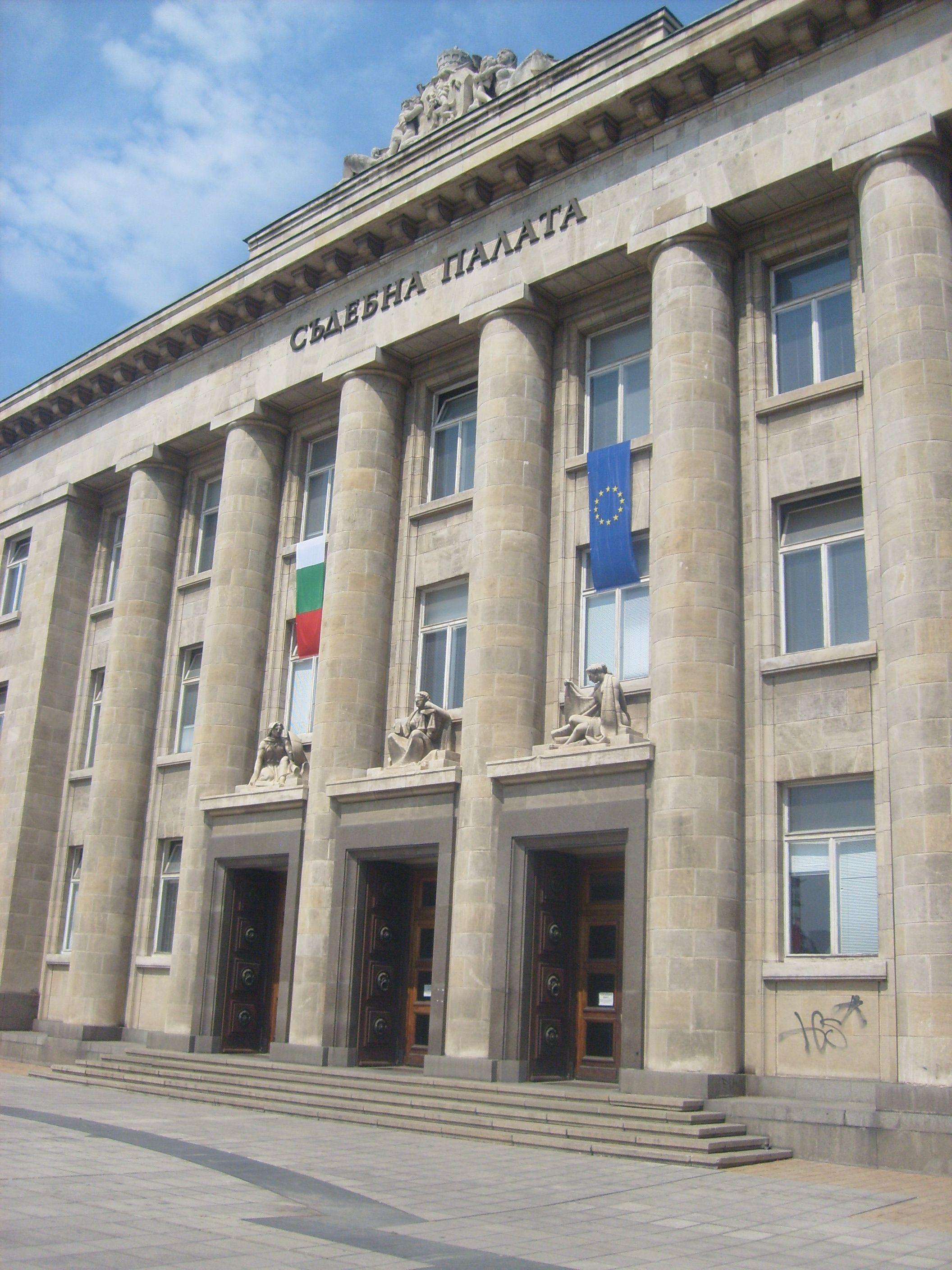

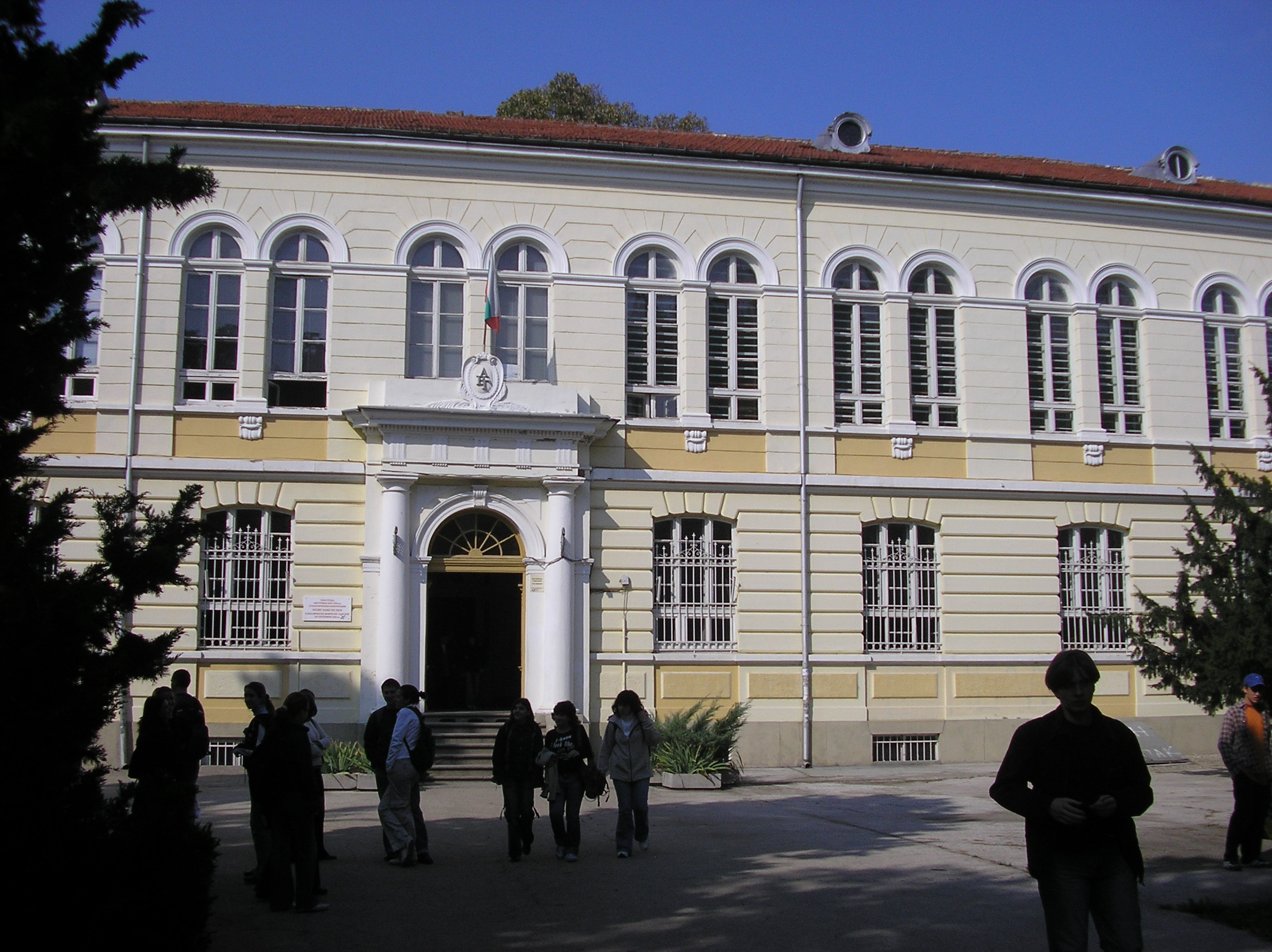
The English language school in Ruse

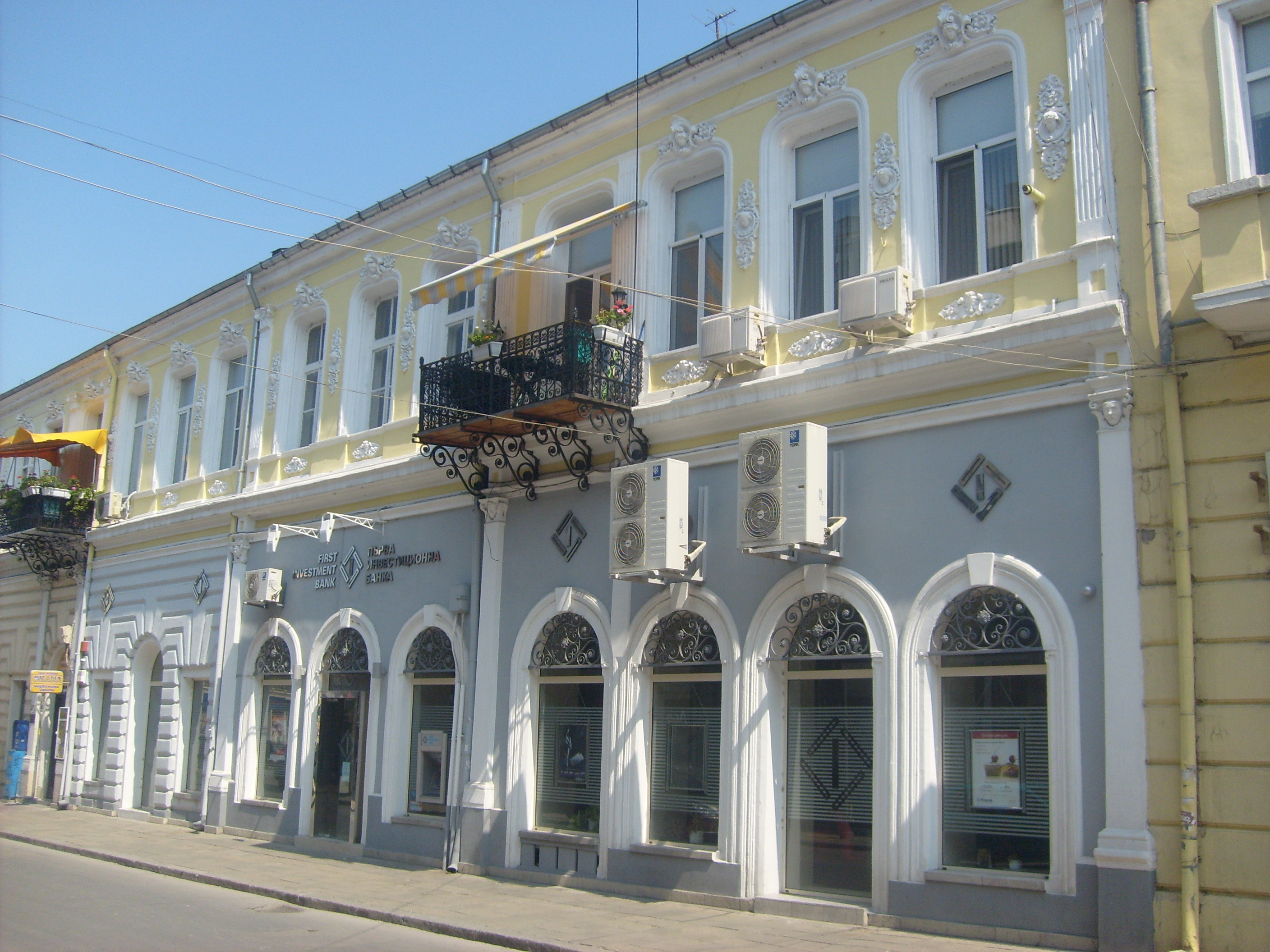

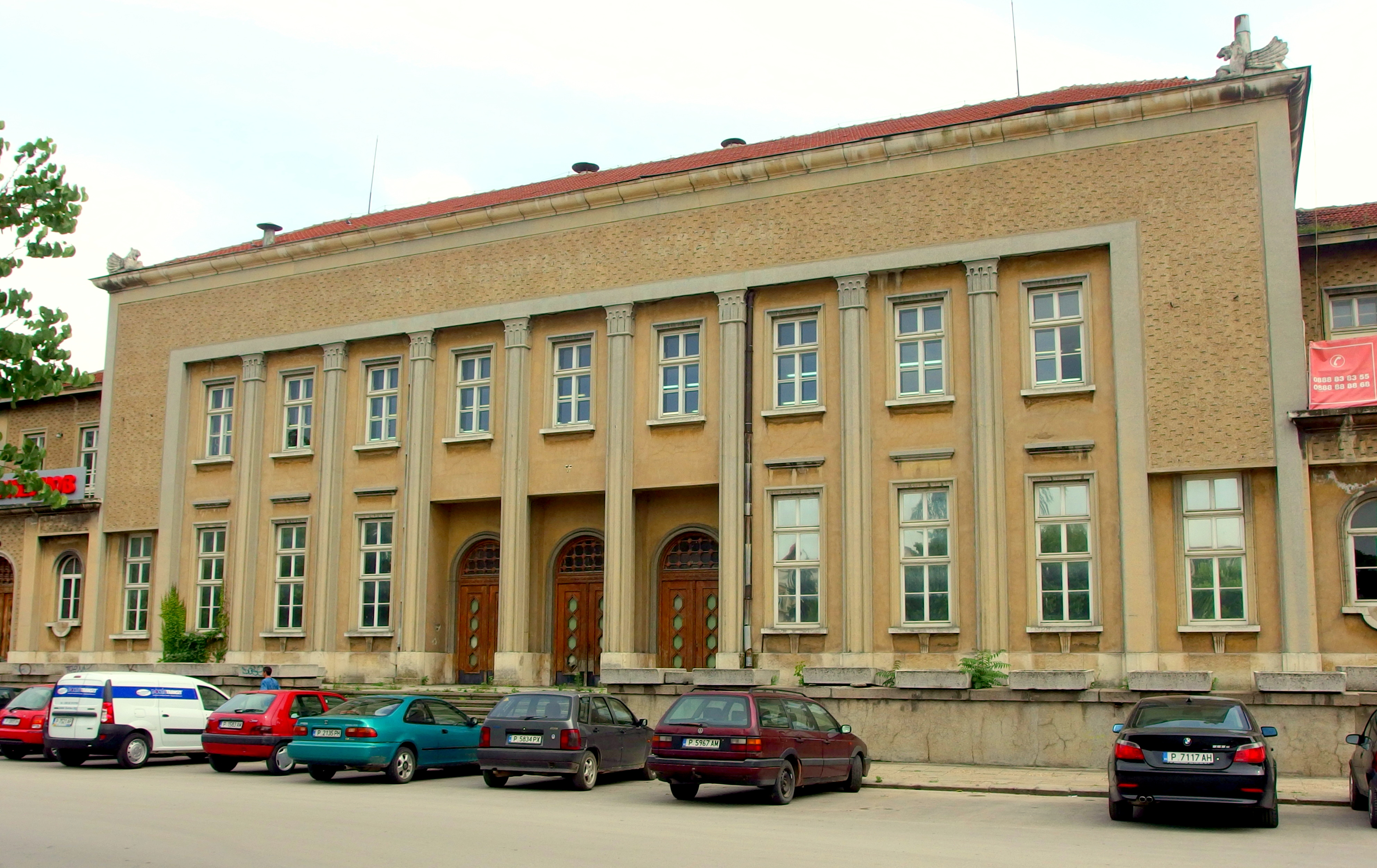

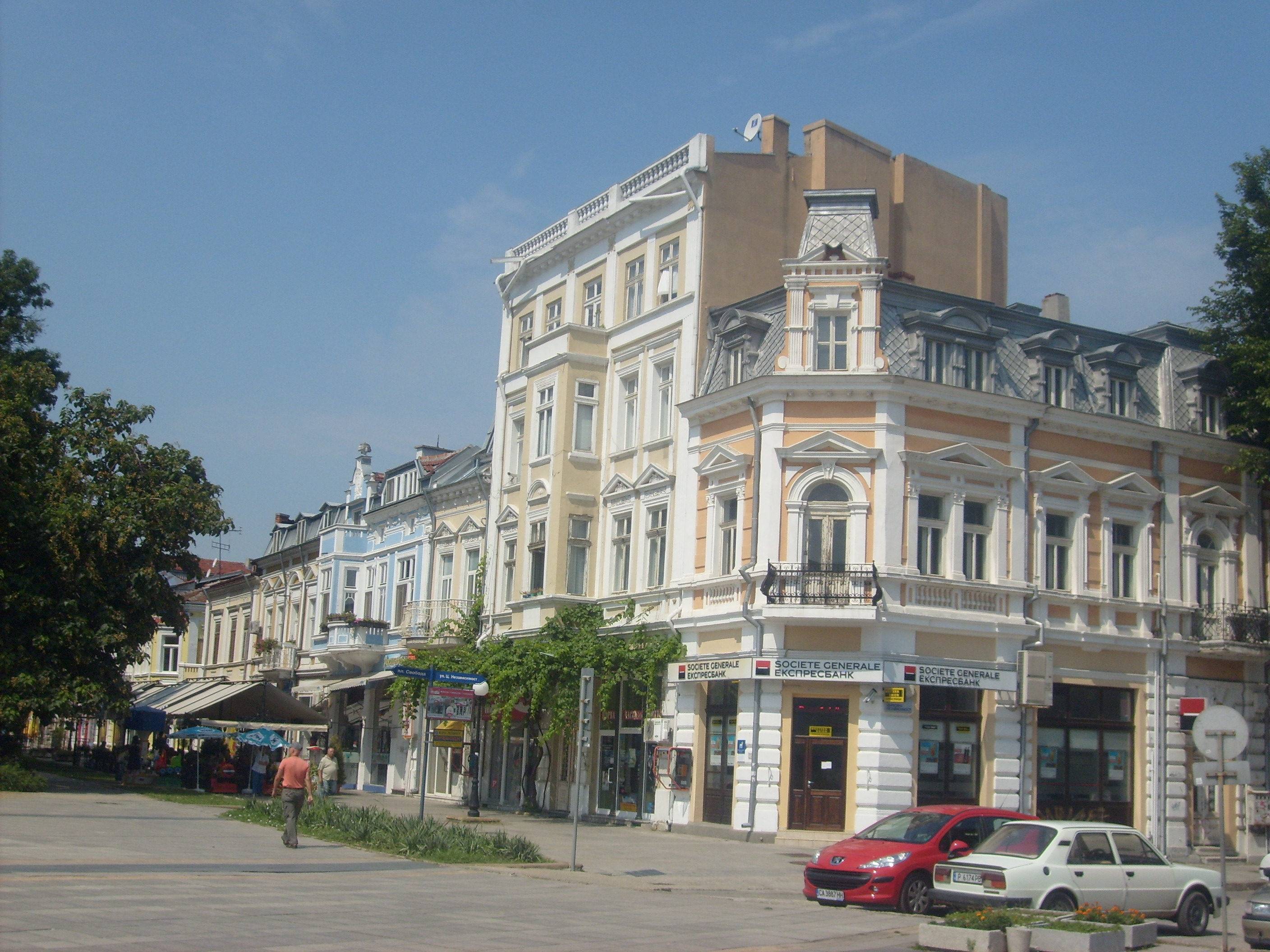

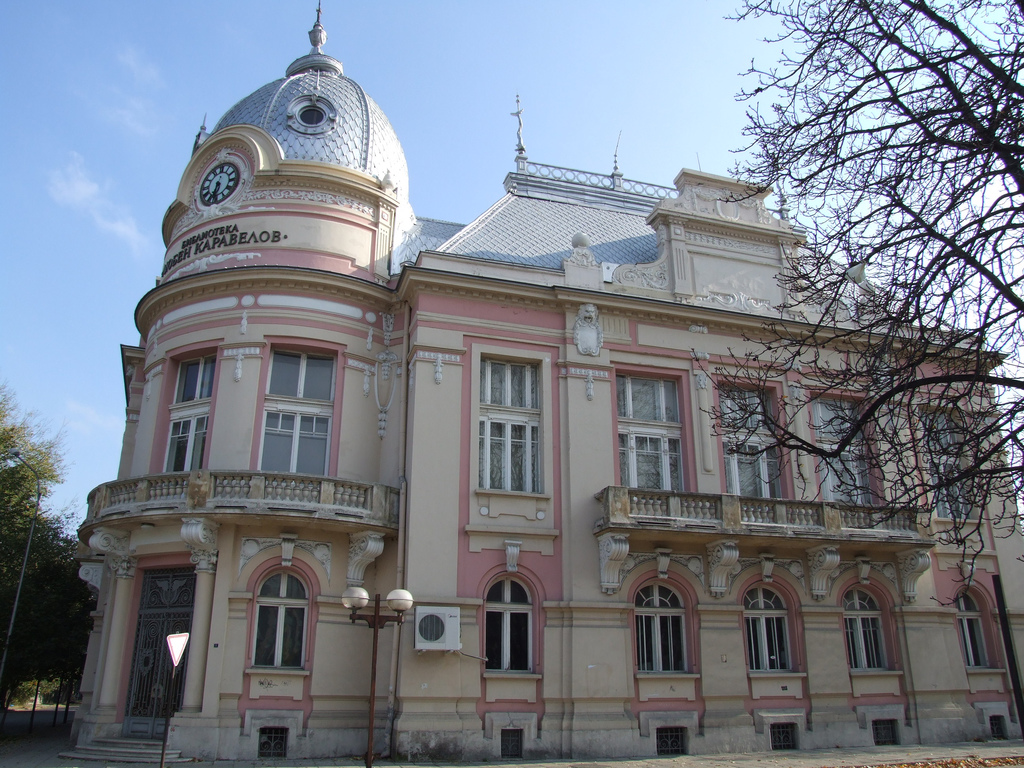

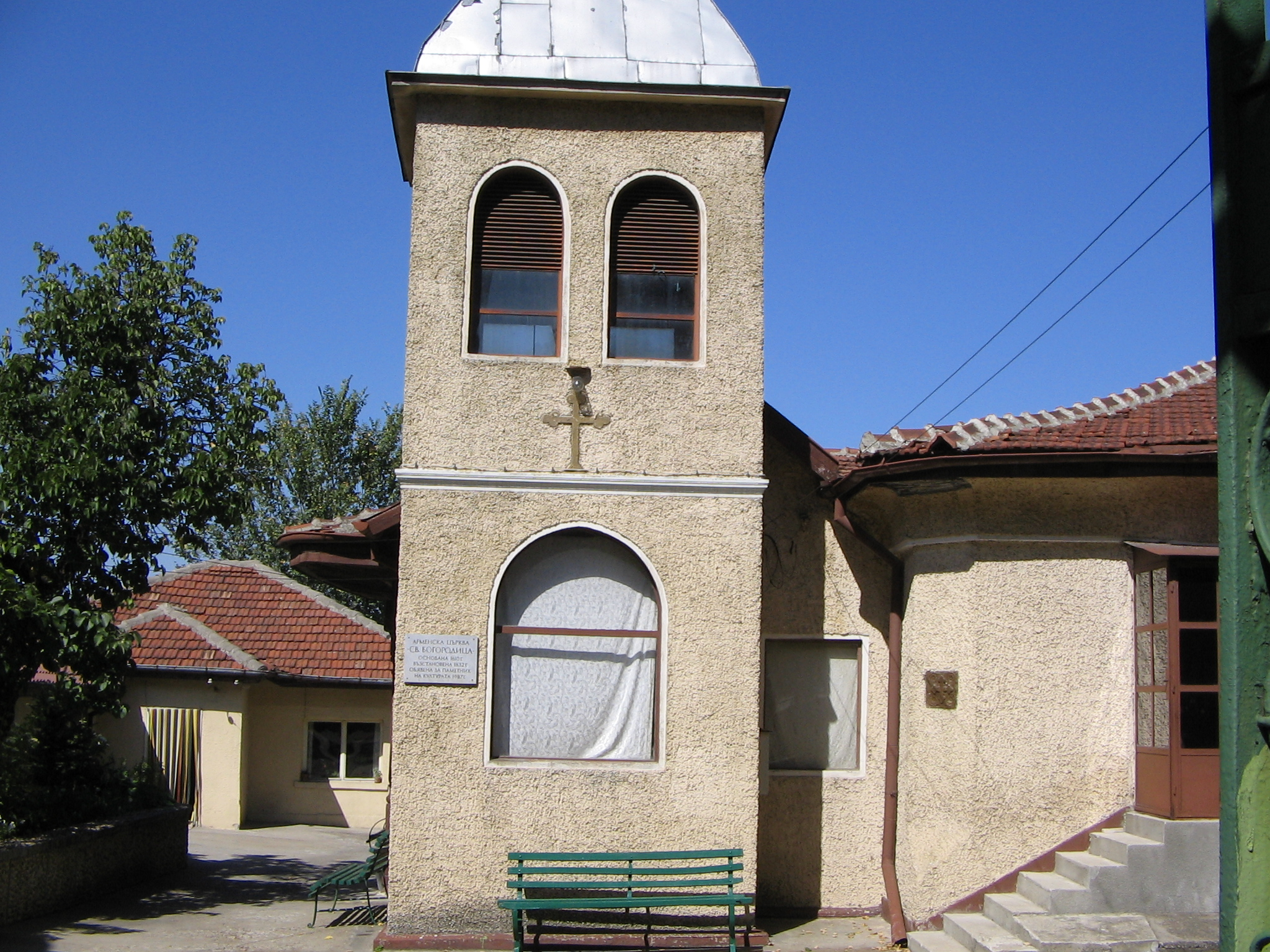

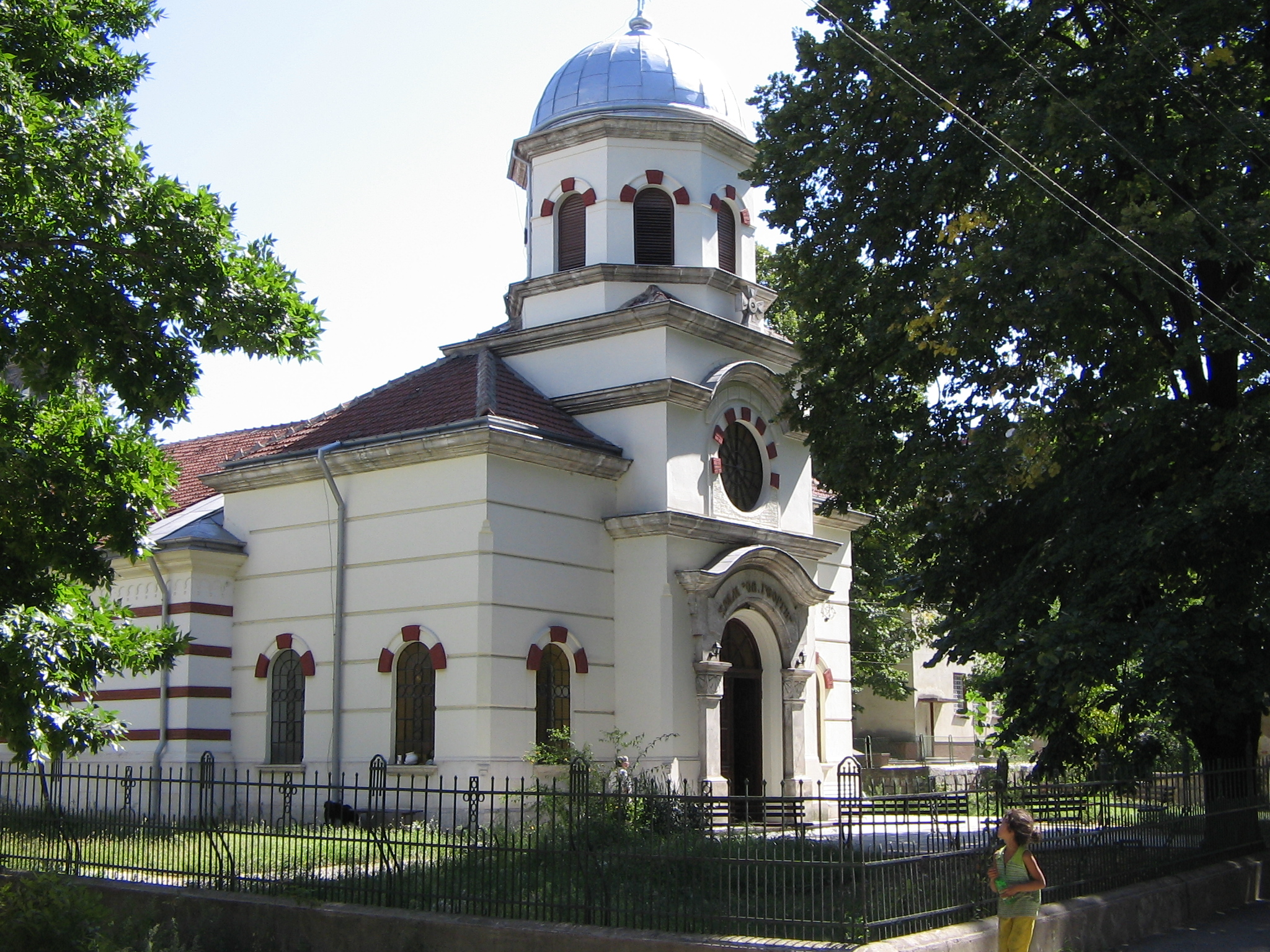

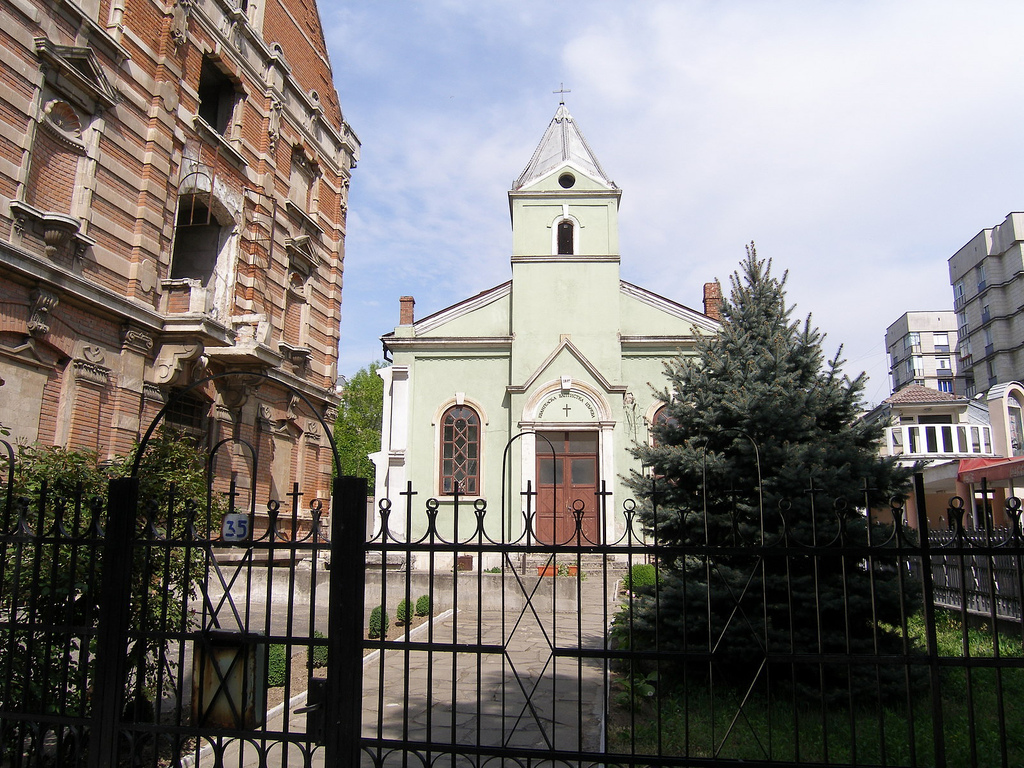

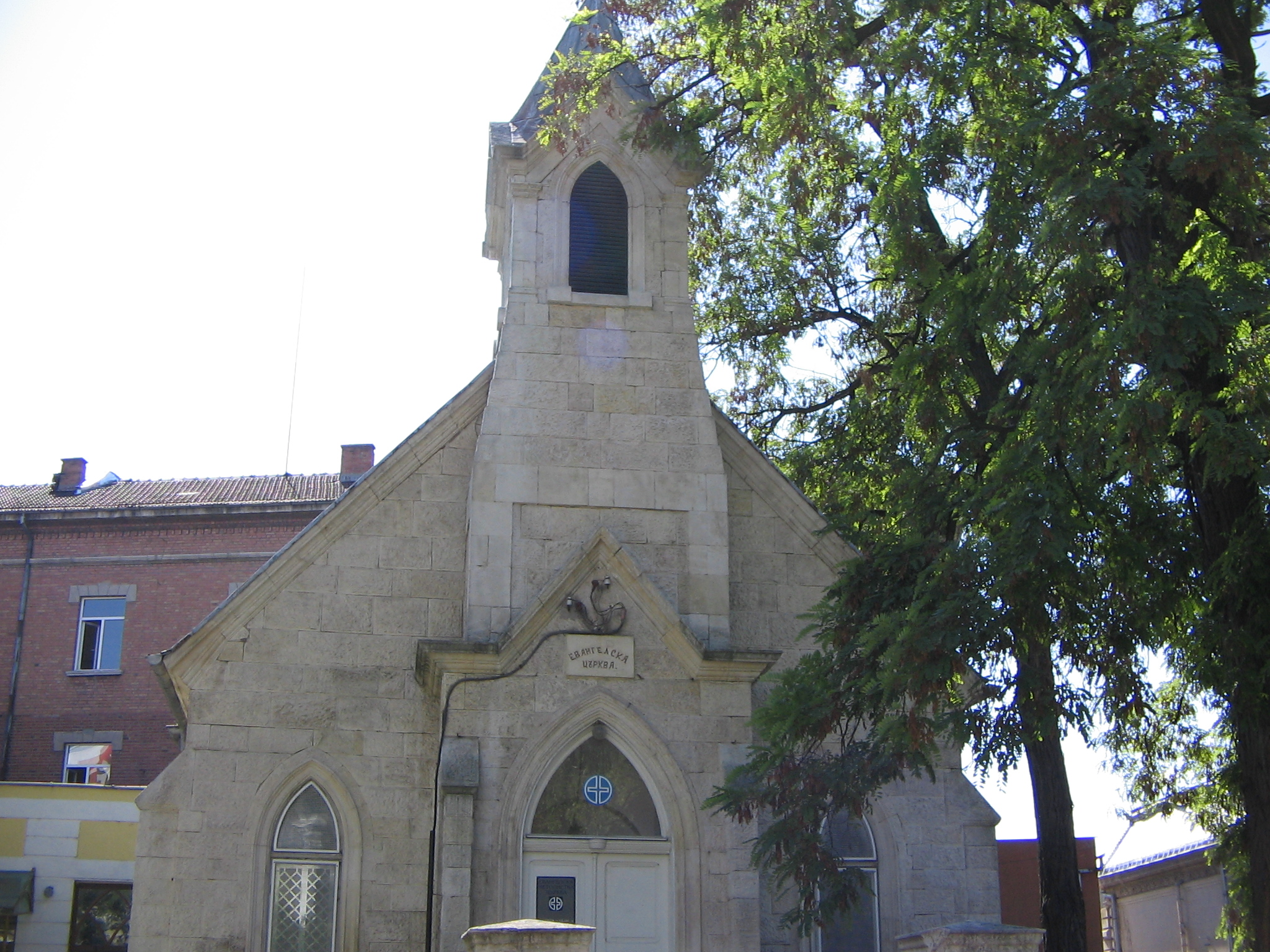

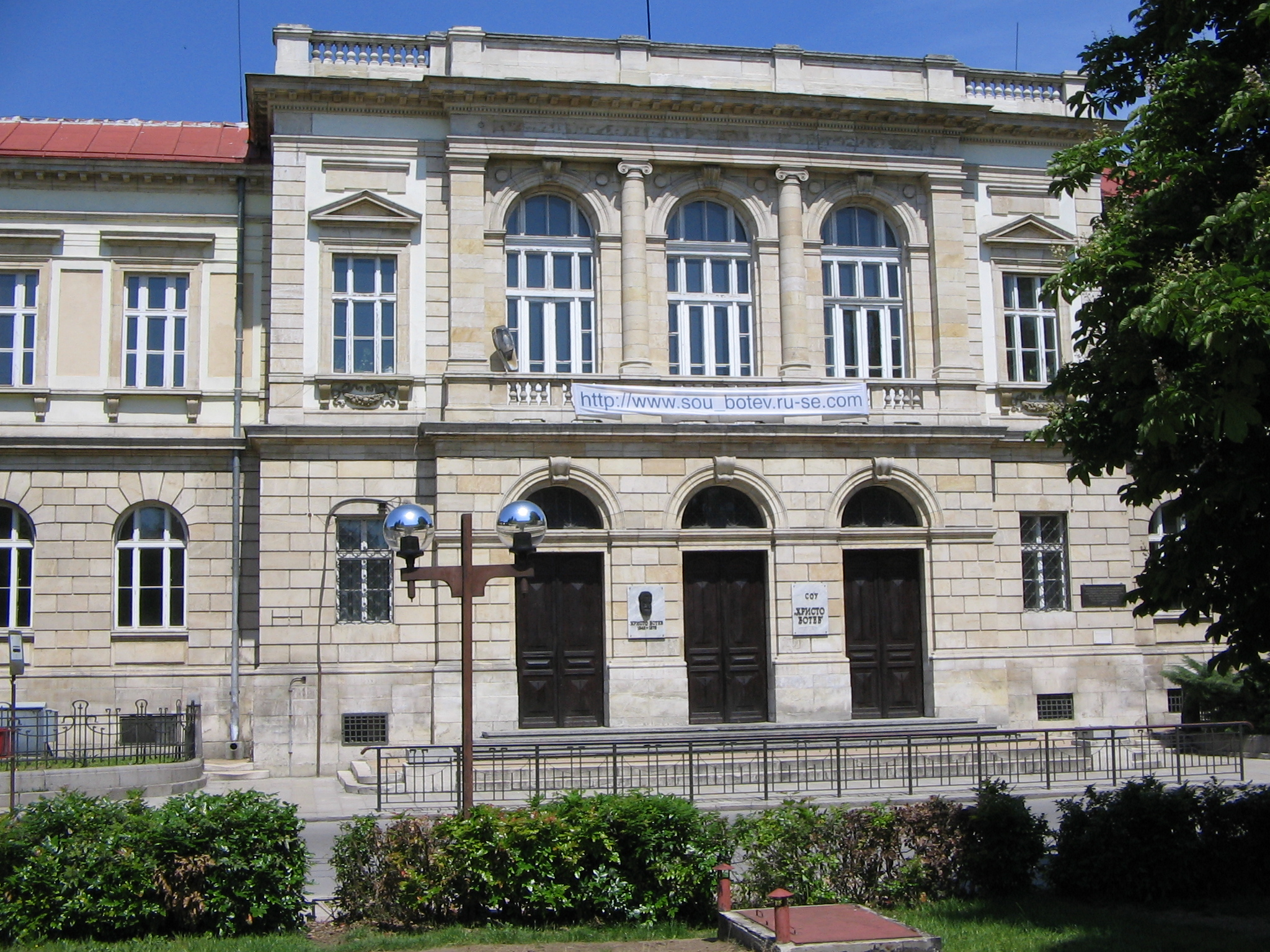

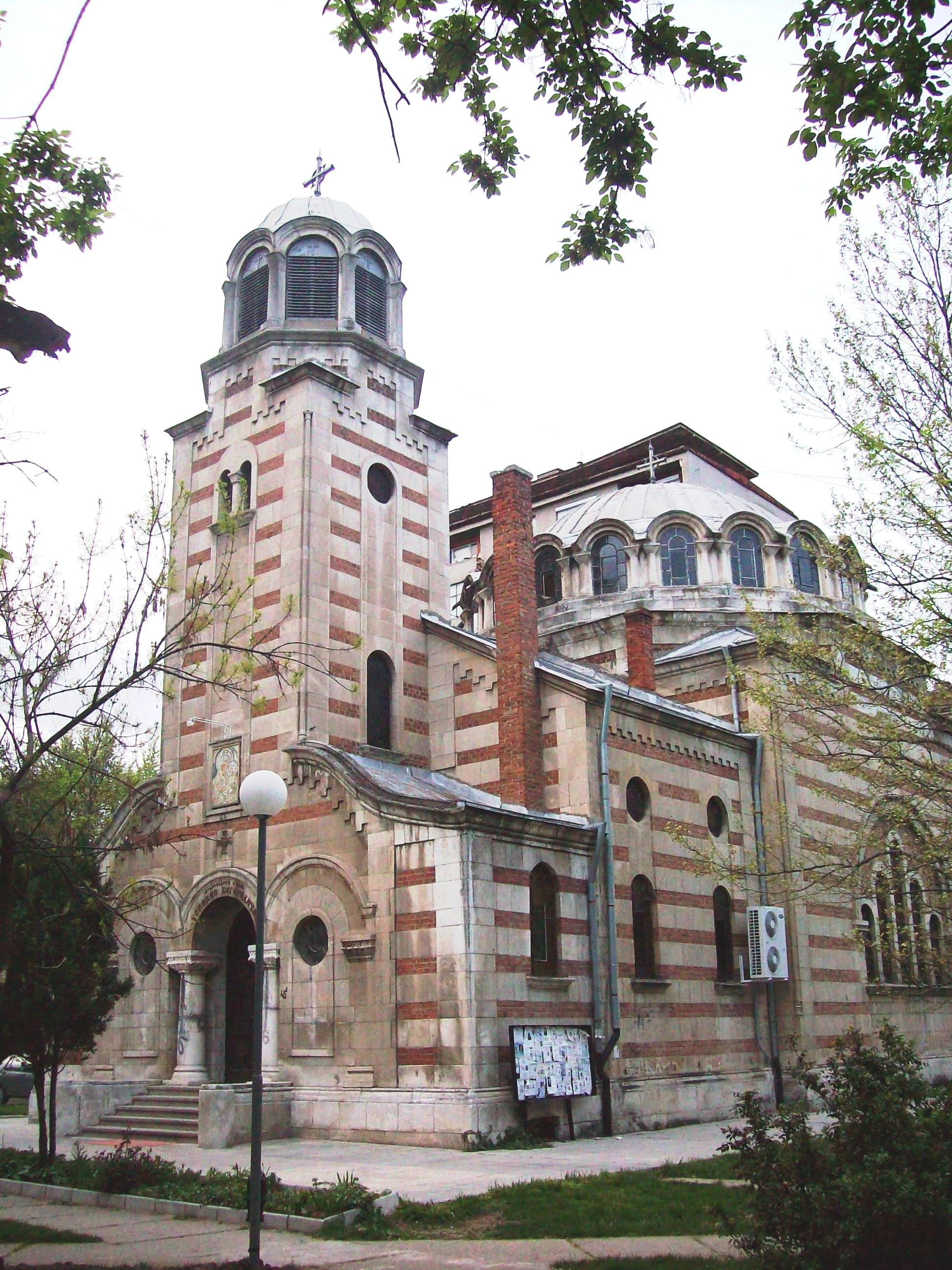

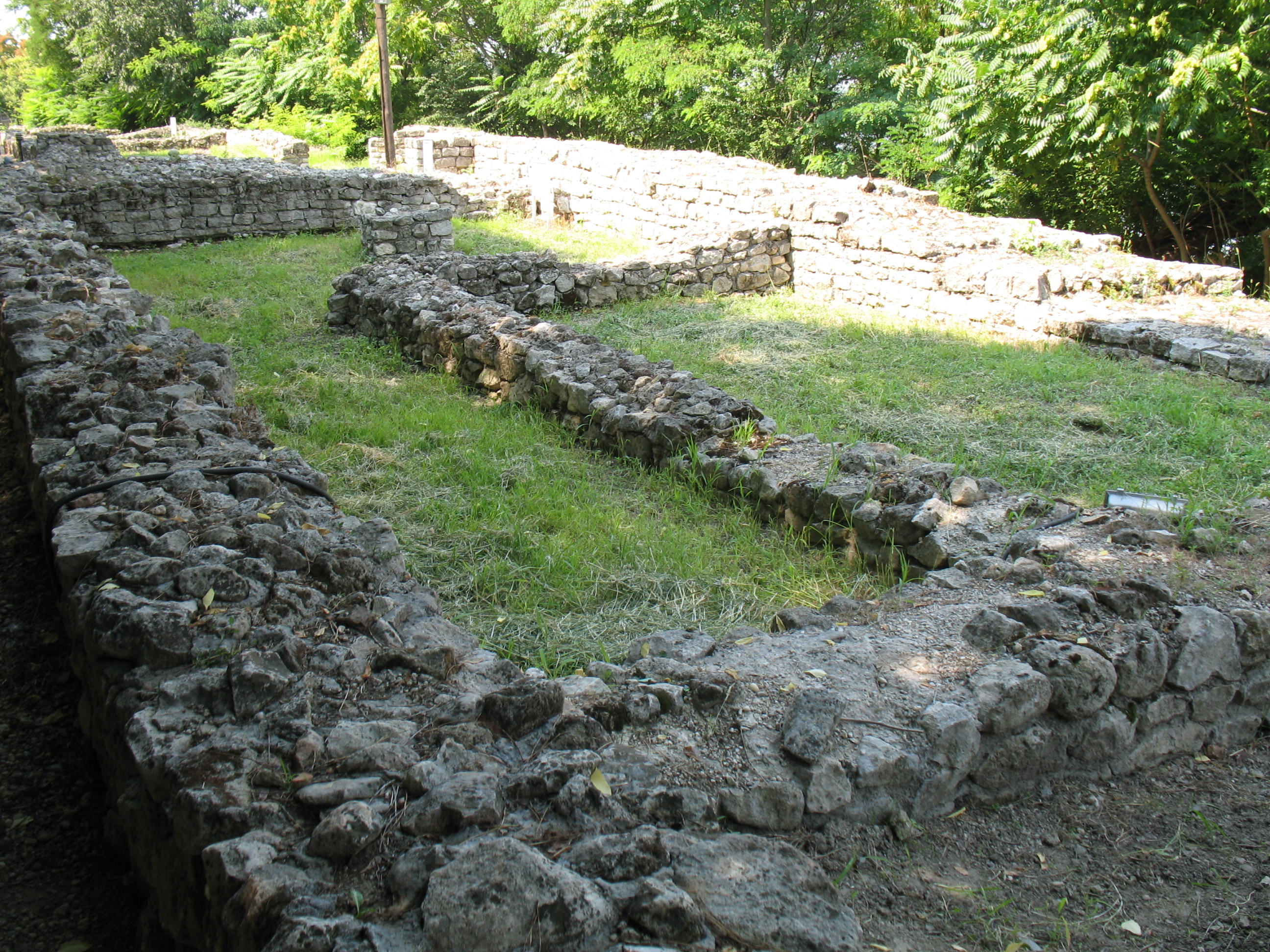
Walls of the Roman fortress Sexaginta Prisca

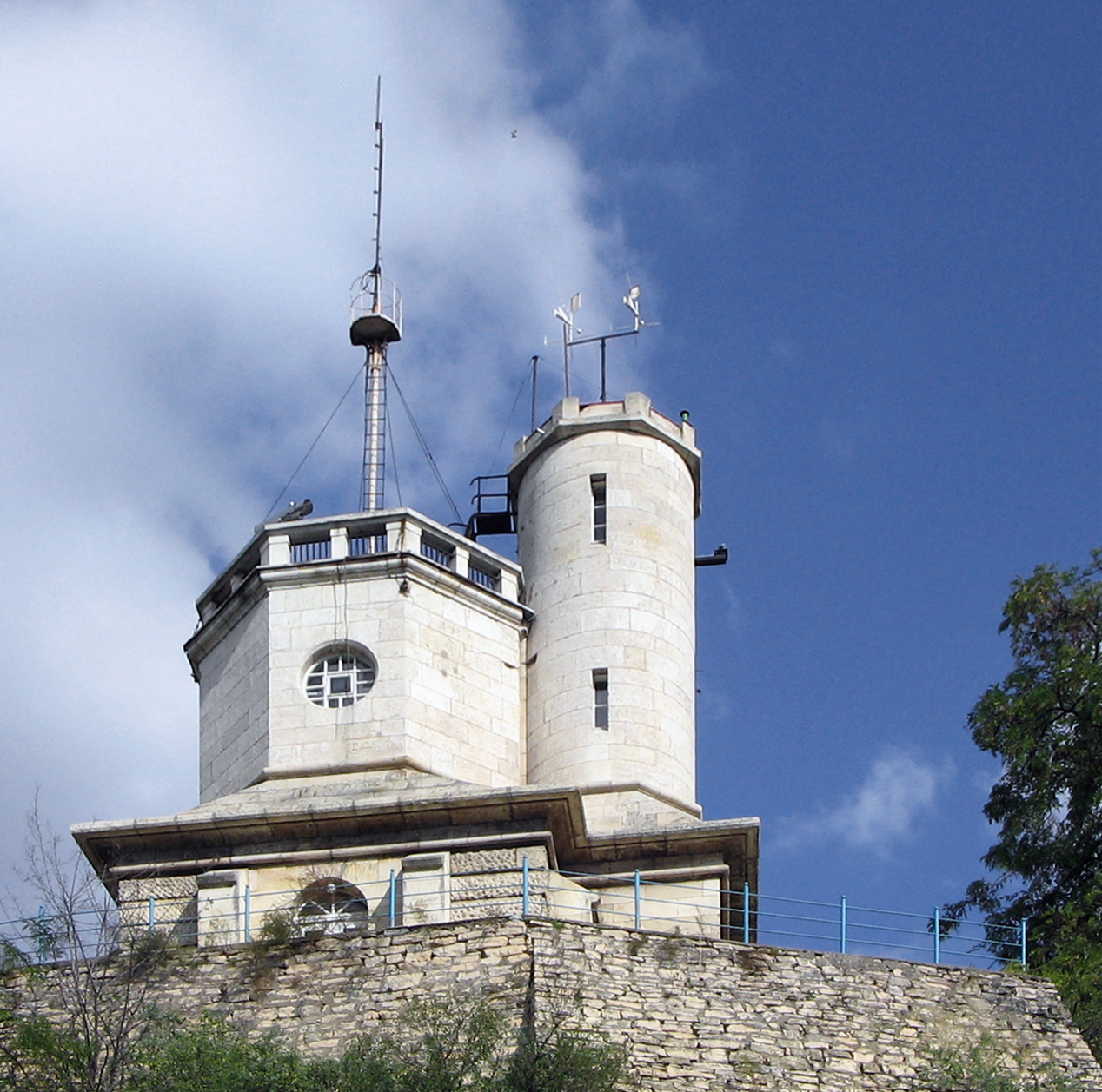
First meteo station in Bulgaria

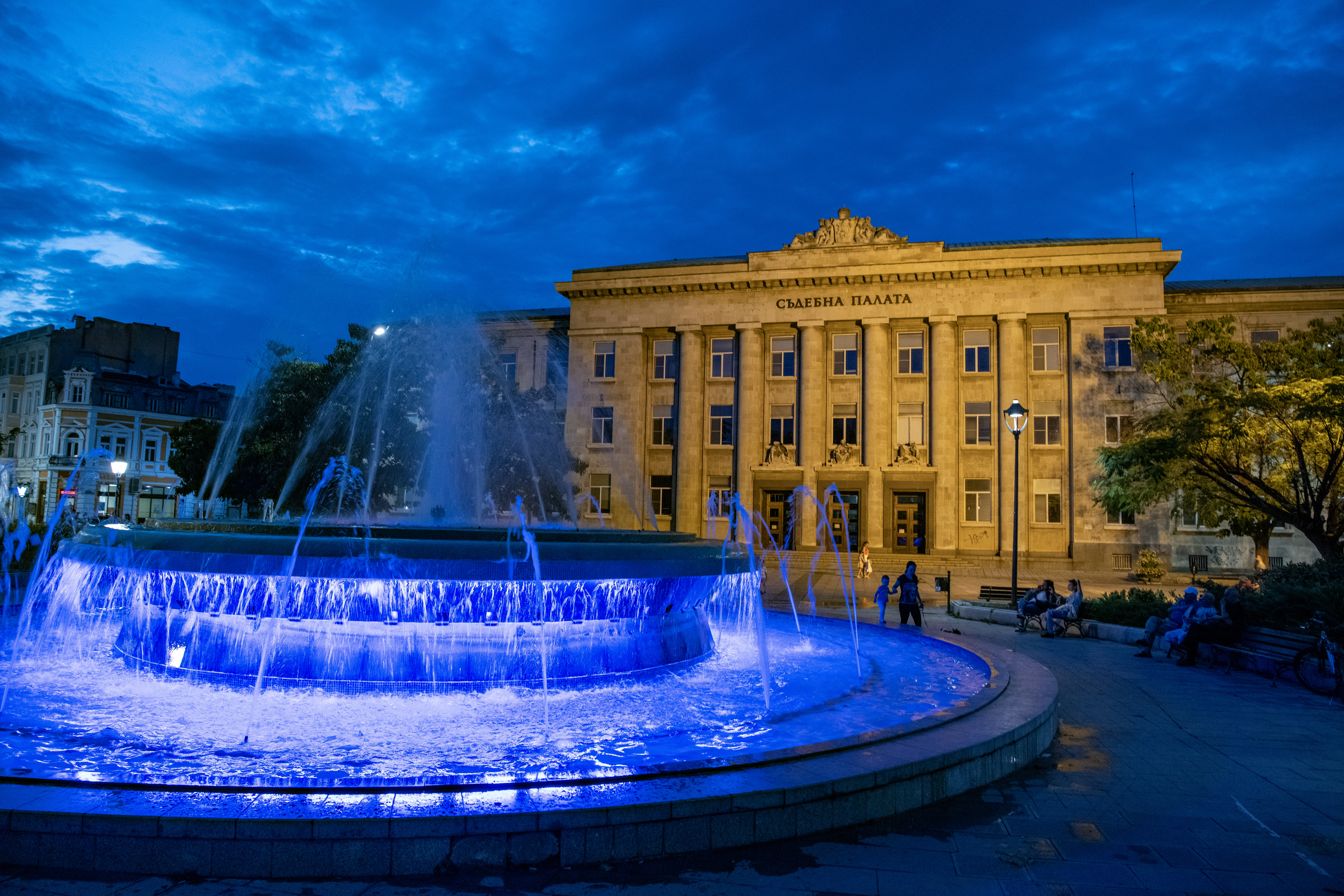

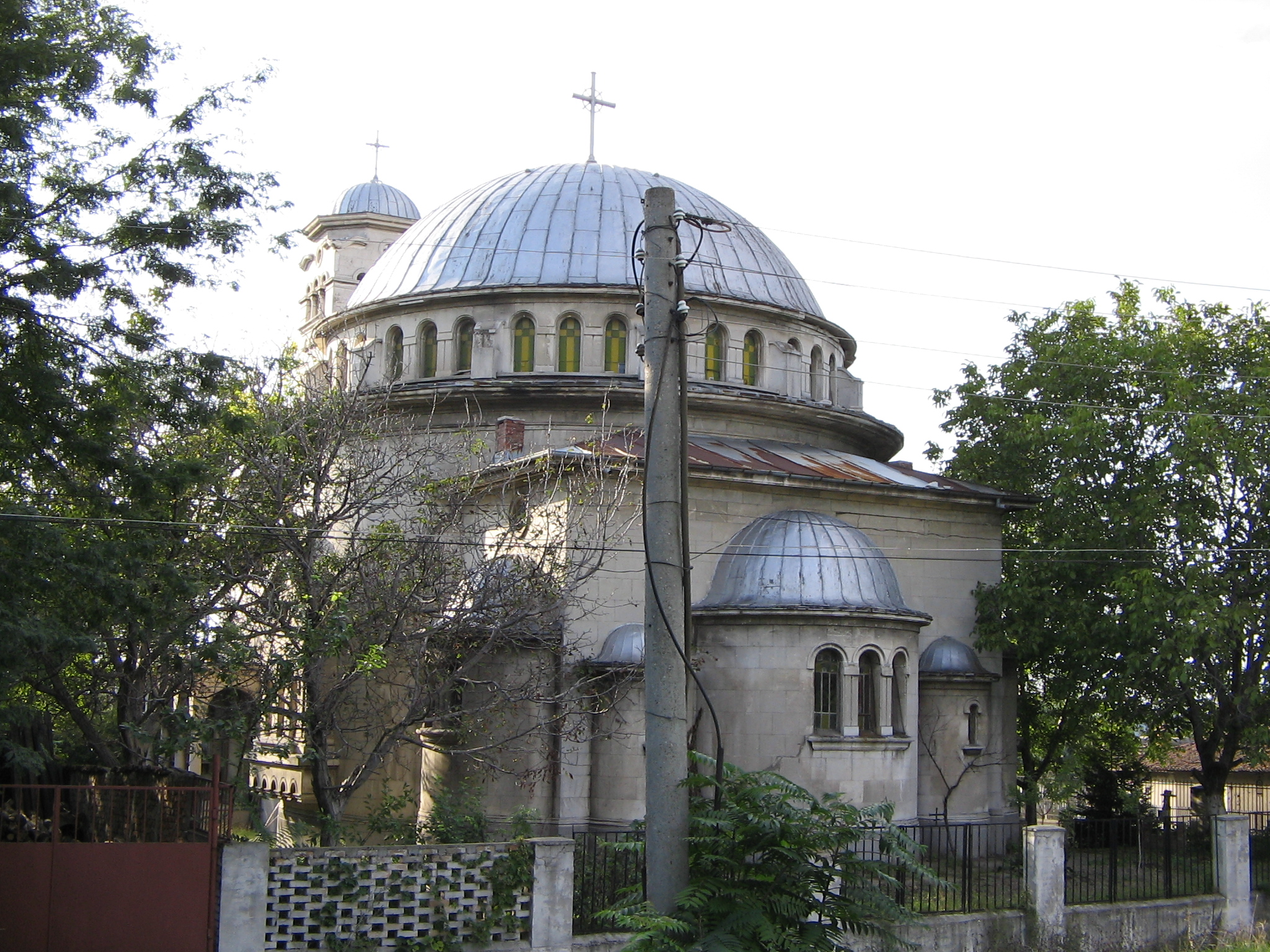

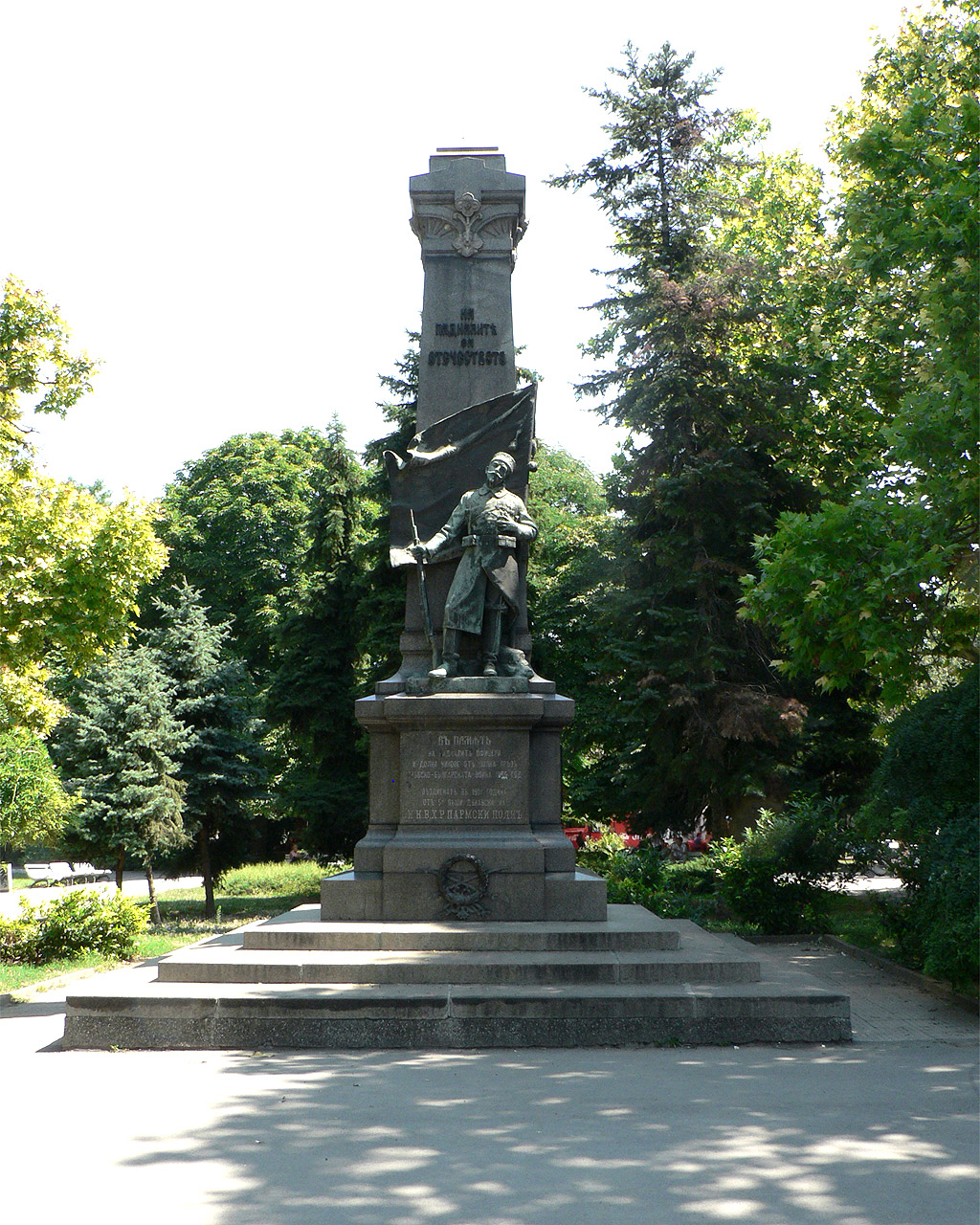

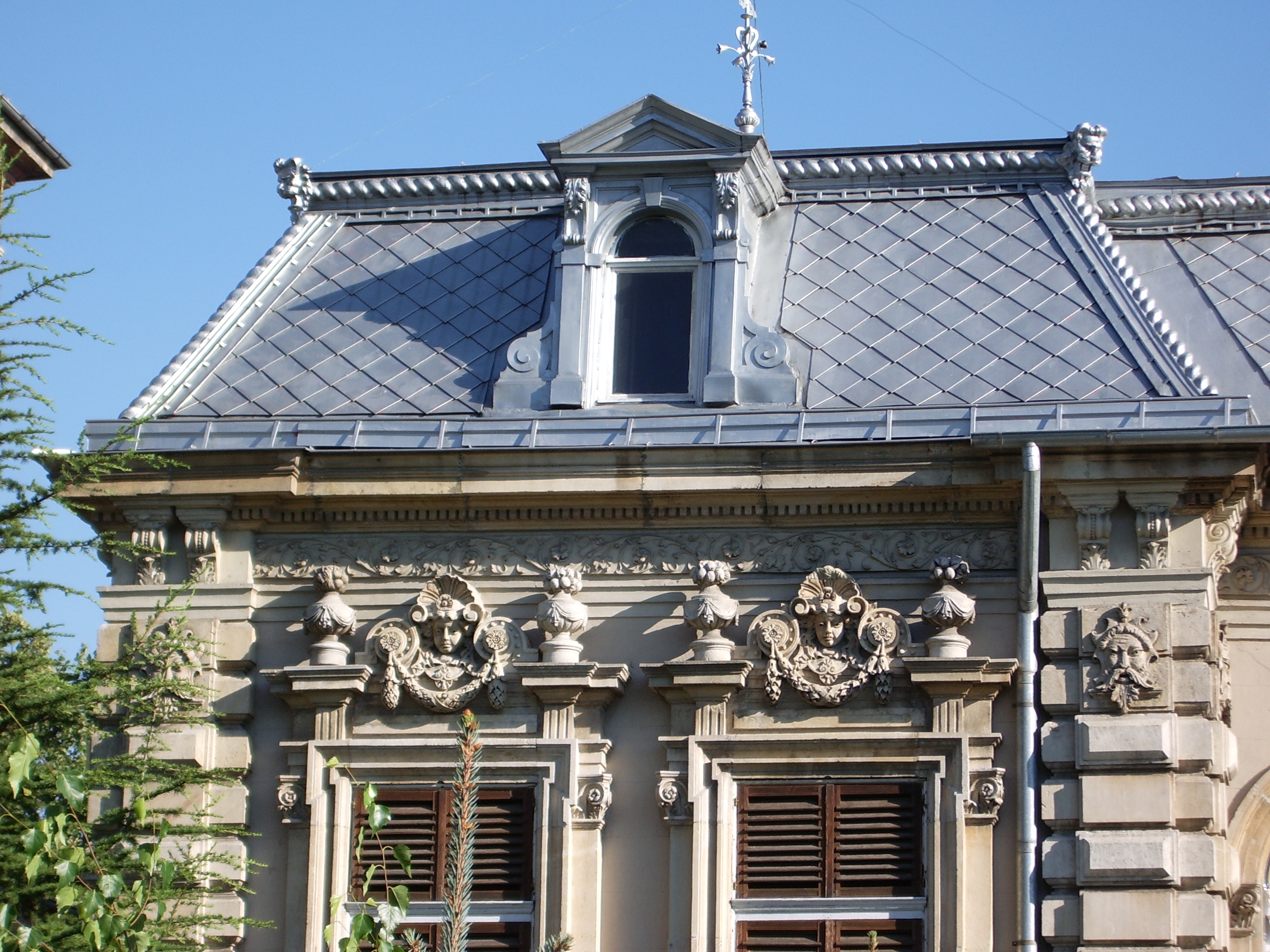

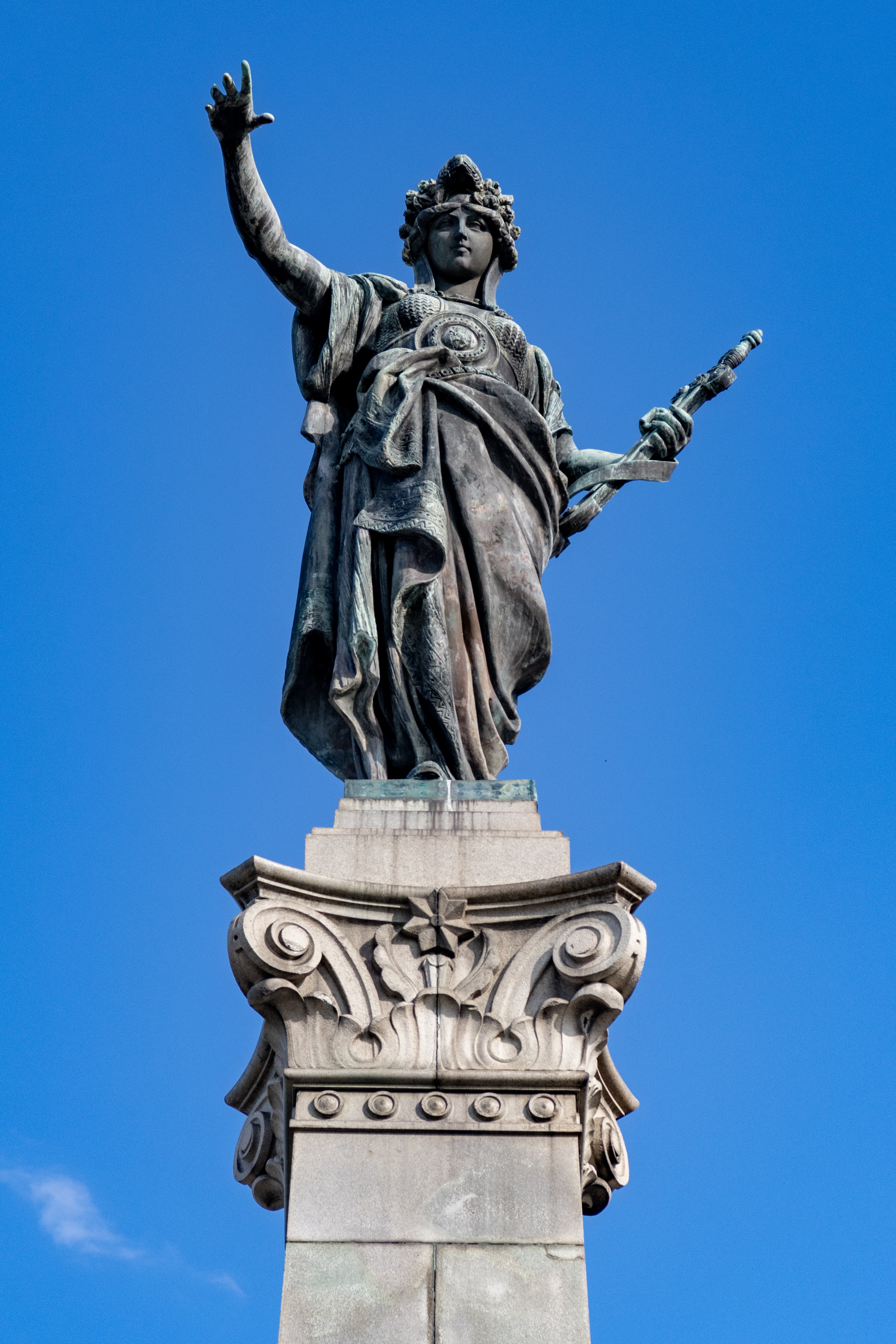

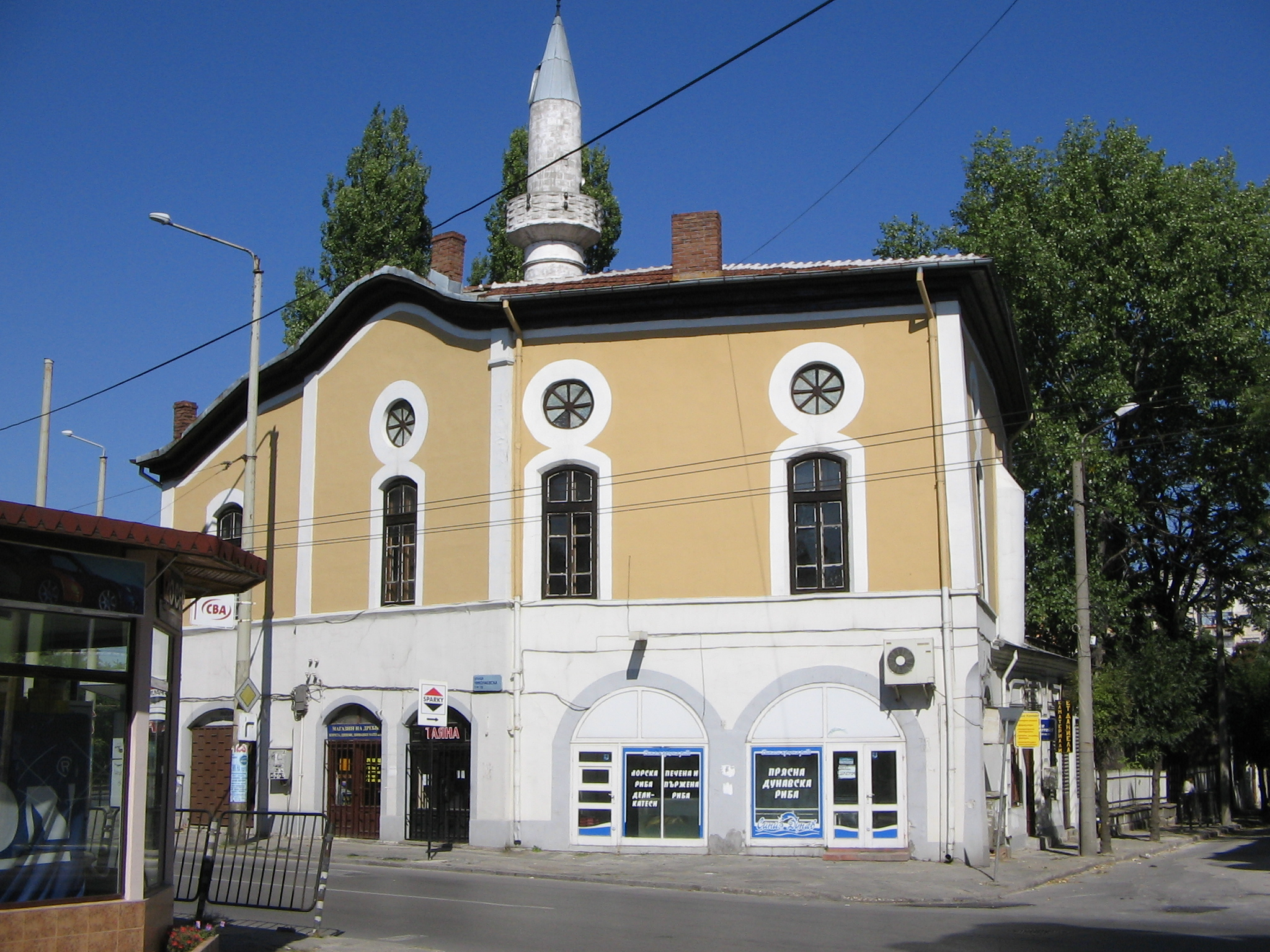

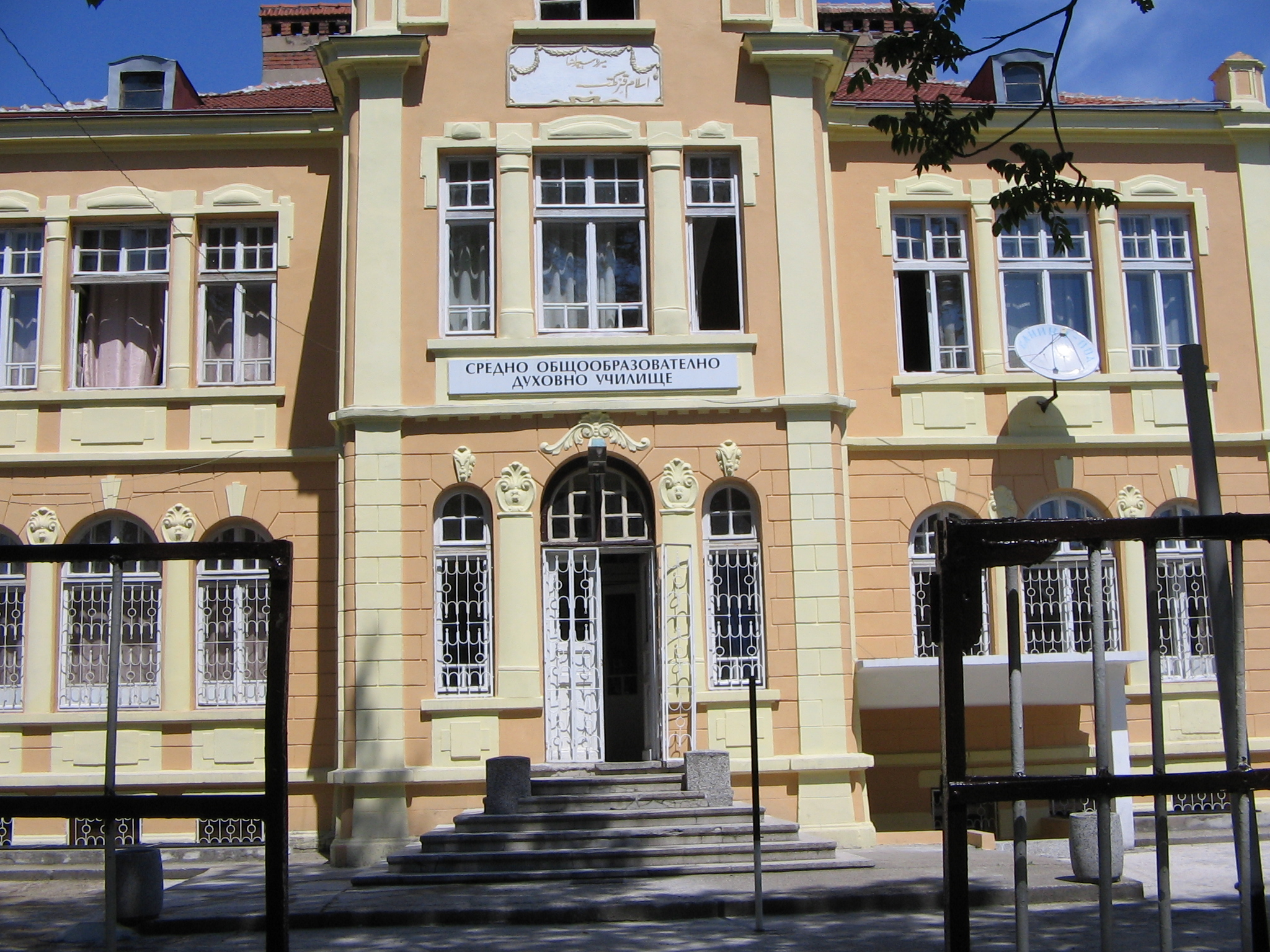

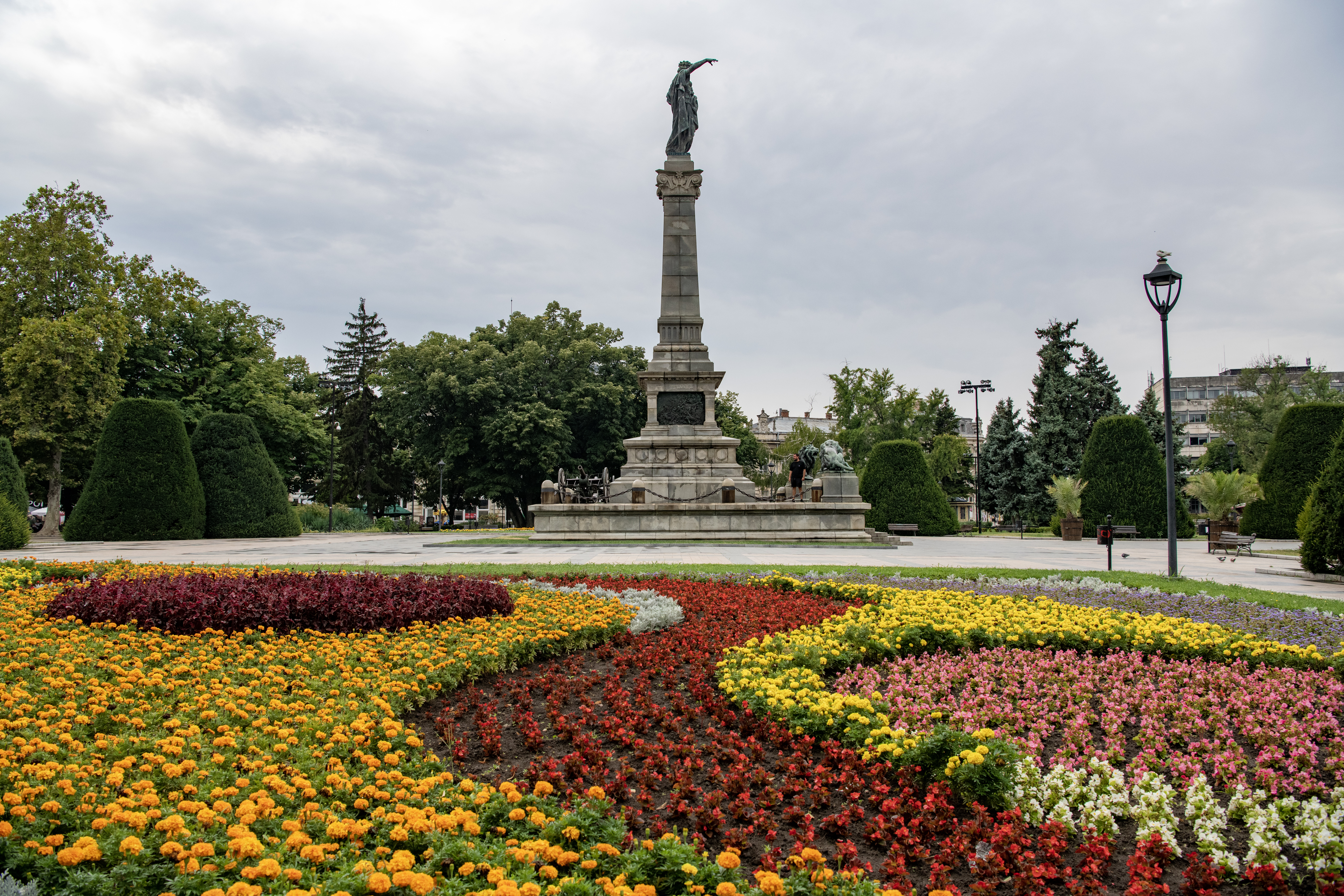

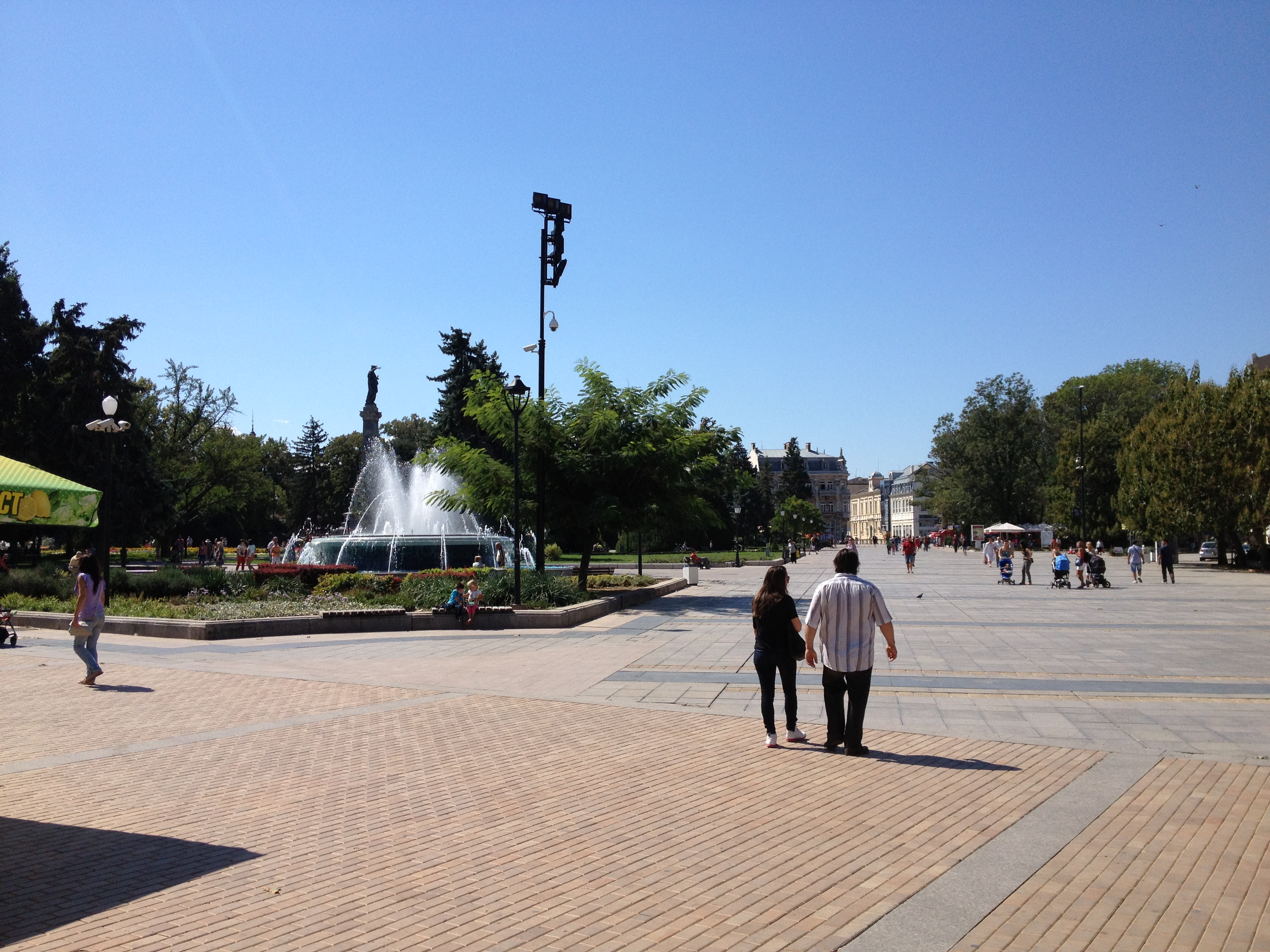
Русе (Център)
