= List of tallest structures in Bulgaria =

An incomplete list of the tallest structures in Bulgaria. This list contains all types of structures.

Structure	Year built	Structural type	Region	Pinnacle height (m)	Pinnacle height (ft)	Coordinates	Remarks
Large chimney of Pirdop copper smelter and refinery	1958	Chimney	Pirdop	325.4 m	1067.3 ft	42°43′13.67″N 24°9′52.41″E	
Chimney of Maritza East Power Station, Unit 3	1977	Chimney	Mednikarovo	325 m	1066 ft	42°08′42.91″N 26°0′12.24″E	
Large chimneys of Maritza East Power Station, Unit 2	1980	Chimney	Radetski	325 m	1066 ft	42°15′16.62″N 26°7′54.93″E ; 42°15′13.48″N 26°8′5.28″E	
Venets Transmitter	1975	Guyed Mast	Shumen Province	302 m	991 ft	43°29′49.71″N 26°53′37.76″E	
Vidin Transmitter, mast 1	1973	Guyed Mast	Vidin	259 m	850 ft	43°50′23.97″N 22°42′53.94″E	insulated against ground, equipped with cage antenna
Pleven mediumwave transmitter	1956	Guyed Mast	Pleven	250 m	820 ft	43°24′20.3″N 24°45′20.5″E ; 43°24′18.06″N 24°45′20.8″E	2 guyed masts, insulated against ground
Stara Zagora Transmitter, Large masts	?	Guyed Mast	Mogila	216 m	709 ft	42°23′42.11″N 25°42′10.27″E ; 42°23′39.52″N 25°42′10.3″E	insulated against ground
Vakarel Transmitter, Blaw-Knox Mast	1937	Guyed Mast	Vakarel	215 m	705 ft	42°34′35.18″N 23°41′55.52″E	insulated against ground; demolished on 16 September 2020
Petrich Transmitter	1977	Guyed Mast	Petrich	205 m	673 ft	41°28′14″N 23°19′37″E	insulated against ground, equipped with cage antenna
Shumen transmitter 1	1976	Guyed mast	Shumen	205 m	673 ft	43°13′26.75″N 27°1′47.6″E	mast insulated against ground, equipped with cage antenna
Rousse TV Tower	1987	Tower	Ruse Province	204 m	669 ft	43°49′27″N 25°57′27″E	
Chimney of Bobov Dol Power Plant		Chimney	Bobov Dol	200 m	656 ft	42°17′7.24″N 23°2′2.92″E	
Masts of Sofia-3 Transmitter	1976	Guyed mast	Vakarel	200 m	656 ft	42°34′8.29″N 23°41′55.04″E ; 42°34′7.14″N 23°41′58.59″E ; 42°34′5.99″N 23°42′2.27″E	3 masts, insulated against ground
Vitosha Mountain TV Tower	1985	Tower	Sofia City	186 m	354 ft	42°38′12″N 23°14′38″E	
Ruse Iztok Power Plant, Large Chimneys		Chimney	Ruse	180 m	591 ft	43°51′56.46″N 26°0′36.42″E ; 43°52′0.03″N 26°0′35.95″E	
Chimneys of TPP DevEn		Chimney	Devnya	180 m	591 ft	43°11′52.04″N 27°37′53.11″E ; 43°11′49.62″N 27°37′56.53″E	
Chimneys of Kozloduy Nuclear Power Plant		Chimney	Kozloduy	180 m	591 ft	43°44′52.89″N 23°46′1.61″E ; 43°44′26.06″N 23°46′31.29″E ;43°44′23.06″N 23°46′41.16″E	
TPP Plovdiv, Large Chimney		Chimney	Plovdiv	180 m	591 ft	42°10′57.64″N 24°44′36.64″E	
Large chimney of heating power plant of Burgas Lukoil Refinery		Chimney	Burgas	180 m	591 ft	42°32′59.95″N 27°19′51.24″E	
Small chimneys of Maritza East Power Station, Unit 2		Chimney	Radetski	180 m	591 ft	42°15′14.76″N 26°8′7.47″E ; 42°15′13.49″N 26°8′11.29″E	
Kaliakra transmitter, Large Masts	1986	Guyed Masts	Kaliakra	172 m	564 ft	43°23′25.07″N 28°25′4.74″E ; 43°23′21.59″N 28°25′1.26″E	2 masts
Chimney of KCM Plovdiv		Chimney	Plovdiv	160 m	525 ft	42°3′39.02″N 24°48′59.16″E	
Chimney of TES Maritza-East		Chimney	Dimitrovgrad	160 m	525 ft	42°3′7.06″N 25°37′24.05″E	
Chimney of Devnya Cement		Chimney	Devnya	160 m	525 ft	42°14′11.89″N 27°35′32.52″E	
Snezhanka Tower	1978	Tower	Pamporovo	156 m	512 ft	41°38′13.75″N 24°40′44.23″E	
Chimney of Sviloza Power Plant		Chimney	Svishtov	150 m	492 ft	43°38′32.21″N 25°18′18.1″E	
Chimney of Sviloza		Chimney	Svishtov	150 m	492 ft	43°38′15.91″N 25°17′59.1″E ; 43°38′18.46″N 25°18′26.49″E	
Large chimney of Zemlyane Power Plant		Chimney	Sofia	150 m	492 ft	42°41′13.85″N 23°17′6.33″E	
Chimneys of Varna Power Plant		Chimney	Varna	150 m	492 ft	43°11′41.68″N 27°45′54.33″E ; 43°11′45.32″N 27°45′57.66″E	
Dobrich TV Tower	1978	Tower	Dobrich	146 m	479 ft	43°32′57″N 27°48′57″E	
Kaliakra transmitter, Small Masts	1986	Guyed Masts	Kaliakra	145 m	476 ft	43°23′19.85″N 28°25′12″E ; 43°23′17.72″N 28°25′10.84″E ;43°23′18.45″N 28°25′17.33″E ; 43°23′16.2″N 28°25′16.09″E ;43°23′16.54″N 28°25′22.89″E ;43°23′14.58″N 28°25′21.58″E ;43°23′12.78″N 28°25′27.22″E ; 43°23′14.69″N 28°25′28.69″E (unfinished)	7 masts completed, 1 unfinished
Shumen transmitter 2	1962	Guyed mast	Shumen	142 m	466 ft	43°20′33″N 27°1′33″E	insulated against ground
Ruse Iztok Power Plant, Small Chimney		Chimney	Ruse	140 m	459 ft	43°52′3.45″N 26°0′36.14″E	
Chimney of TES Pleven		Chimney	Pleven	140 m	459 ft	43°25′18.33″N 24°37′28.42″E	
Chimney of Targovishte Shishedcham Works		Chimney	Targovishte	135 m	443 ft	43°16′25.87″N 26°31′10.82″E	
Cooling tower of Maritza East Power Station, Unit 1		Chimney	Obruchishte	135 m	443 ft	42°9′32.79″N 25°54′32.14″E	
Vidin Transmitter, mast 2–5	1973	Guyed Mast	Vidin	133 m	436 ft	43°50′7.81″N 22°42′39.96″E ; 43°50′6.8″N 22°42′43.13″E ; 43°50′5.47″N 22°42′38.26″E ; 43°50′4.52″N 22°42′41.35″E	insulated against ground
Belogradchik TV Tower	1979	Tower	Vidin Province	125 m	410 ft	43°27′41.3″N 22°42′21.27″E ?	
Chimneys of TPP Sofia		Chimney	Sofia	124 m	407 ft	42°43′9.61″N 23°19′25.33″E ; 42°43′11.53″N 23°19′26″E ; 42°43′13.87″N 23°19′27.52″E	
Chimneys of TPP Sofia-Iztok		Chimney	Sofia	124 m	407 ft	42°39′9.85″N 23°25′3.69″E ; 42°39′5.4″N 23°25′2.76″E ; 42°39′11.35″N 23°25′7.63″E ; 42°39′9″N 23°25′7.24″E	
Small chimney of heating power plant of Burgas Lukoil Refinery		Chimney	Burgas	120 m	394 ft	42°32′56.76″N 27°19′54.58″E	
Chimney of Ruse-West Heating Power Plant		Chimney	Ruse	120 m	394 ft	43°49′50.96″N 25°55′48.28″E	
Chimney of Burgas Heating Power Plant		Chimney	Burgas	120 m	394 ft	42°31′23.06″N 27°24′17.8″E	
Small chimney of Zemlyane Power Plant		Chimney	Sofia	120 m	394 ft	42°41′12.02″N 23°17′3.73″E	
Chimneys of Kremikovtzi AD		Chimney	Yana	120 m	394 ft	42°44′20.33″N 23°32′50.07″E ; 42°44′31.61″N 23°31′37.27″E ; 42°44′53.74″N 23°32′24.5″E ; 42°44′50.95″N 23°32′28.89″E	
Chimney of Lyulin Heating Power Plant		Chimney	Voluyak	120 m	394 ft	42°44′58.42″N 23°15′11.96″E	
Chimney of Vratsa Heating Power Plant		Chimney	Vratsa	120 m	394 ft	43°11′49.82″N 23°34′51.31″E ; 43°11′41.27″N 23°34′57.1″E	
Chimney of Brikel TES		Chimney	Galabovo	120 m	394 ft	42°9′16.08″N 25°54′24.43″E	
Small chimney of Pirdop copper smelter and refinery	?	Chimney	Pirdop	120 m	394 ft	42°43′10.43″N 24°9′20.33″E	
Chimney of Mondi Stamboliyski	?	Chimney	Stamboliyski	120 m	394 ft	42°8′9.02″N 24°31′13.15″E	
Chimney of TES Kazanlak	?	Chimney	Kazanlak	120 m	394 ft	42°36′39.09″N 25°22′45.08″E	
Chimney of TES Shumen	?	Chimney	Shumen	120 m	394 ft	43°15′39.64″N 26°57′48.03″E	
Chimney of TES Vidin	?	Chimney	Vidin	120 m	394 ft	43°56′54.05″N 22°51′3.27″E	
Chimneys of TES Sliven	?	Chimney	Sliven	120 m	394 ft	42°39′12.13″N 26°19′33.33″E ;42°39′21.28″N 26°19′38.73″E	
Chimney of TES Gorna Orjahovica	?	Chimney	Gorna Orjahovica	120 m	394 ft	43°8′14.25″N 25°42′16.99″E	
Chimney of TES Plovdiv-South	?	Chimney	Plovdiv	120 m	394 ft	42°7′0.2″N 24°46′9.25″E	
TPP Plovdiv, Small Chimney		Chimney	Plovdiv	120 m	394 ft	42°10′59.89″N 24°44′29.07″E	
Chimney of Dolna Mitropolija	?	Chimney	Dolna Mitropolija	120 m	394 ft	43°28′7.77″N 24°32′44.88″E	
Chimney of Pazardzhik	?	Chimney	Pazardzhik	120 m	394 ft	42°10′23.64″N 24°20′14.25″E	
Silistra TV Tower	1979	Tower	Silistra Province	117 m	384 ft	44°6′7″N 27°15′28″E	
Stramni Rid TV Tower	1970	Tower	Ralitsa	114 m	374 ft	41°26′33.2″N 25°28′57.44″E	
Dragoman Transmitter	1977	Guyed Mast	Sofia-Dragoman	112 m	367 ft	42°54′26″N 22°55′34″E	mast of 4th Sofia radio centre, insulated against ground
Blagoevgrad Transmitter	1995	Guyed Mast	Blagoevgrad	112 m	367 ft	42°2′50″N 23°2′52″E	insulated against ground
Dobrich AM Transmitter	2000	Guyed Mast	Dobrich	112 m	367 ft	43°32′44.56″N 27°48′58.35″E	insulated against ground
Dulovo Transmitter	1991	Guyed Mast	Dulovo	110 m	361 ft	43°51′41″N 27°9′2″E	insulated against ground
Pleven TV Tower	?	Tower	Pleven	107 m	351 ft	43°24′7″N 24°38′56″E	
Borisova Gradina TV Tower	1959	Tower	Sofia City	106 m	348 ft	42°40′36″N 23°20′30″E	
Hotel Rodina	1979	Skyscraper	Sofia	104 m	341 ft	42°41′31.34″N 23°18′29.77″E	
Hotel Sankt Peterburg		Skyscraper	Plovdiv	103 m	338 ft	42°8′27.39″N 24°44′59.28″E	
Chimney of TES Veliko Tarnovo	?	Chimney	Veliko Tarnovo	100 m	328 ft	43°4′9.98″N 25°35′53.69″E	
Cooling towers of Maritza East Power Station, Unit 3		Cooling tower	Mednikarovo	100 m	328 ft	42°08′37.9″N 25°59′55.19″E ;42°08′34.69″N 25°59′51.36″E	
Cooling tower of Maritza East Power Station, Unit 2		Cooling tower	Radetski	100 m	328 ft	42°15′32.23″N 26°7′49.68″E	
Cooling towers of Bobov Dol Power Plant		Chimney	Bobov Dol	100 m	328 ft	42°16′57.93″N 23°1′57.38″E ; 42°16′57.31″N 23°2′3.52″E ; 42°16′53.8″N 23°1′56.69″E	
Tutrakan TV Tower	1979	Tower	Silistra Province	98 m	322 ft	44°2′56″N 26°37′14″E	
Razgrad TV Tower	1978	Tower	Razgrad Province	88 m	289 ft	43°33′24″N 26°32′3″E	
Burgas TV Tower	1993	Tower	Burgas Province	72 m	236 ft	42°30′23.4″N 27°28′11.54″E	

== See also ==
- List of tallest buildings in Sofia
- List of tallest buildings in Bulgaria
- List of tallest buildings in Europe
