= Borisova Gradina TV Tower =

Tower in Sofia, Bulgaria

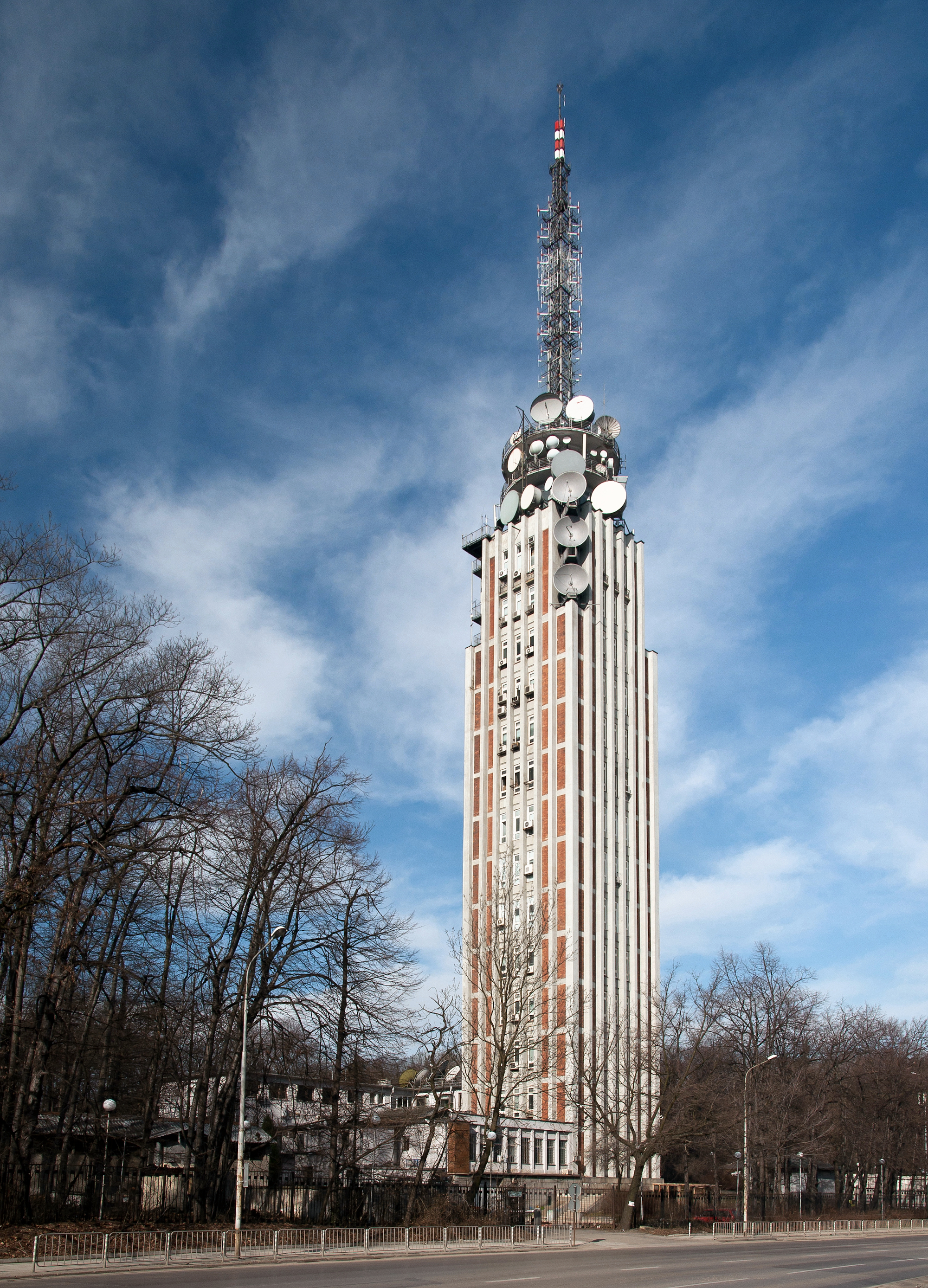

The Borisova Gradina TV Tower, or the Old TV Tower, is a 106-metre-tall (348 ft) TV tower (including the aerial) in the garden Borisova gradina in Sofia, the capital of Bulgaria. It is known as the tower used for the first Bulgarian National Television broadcasts in 1959.

== History ==
The tower was designed by architect Lyuben Podponev, engineer A. Voynov and technologist Georgi Kopkanov. Construction began in December 1958 and the tower was officially opened on 26 December 1959. Its typical floor has an area of 144 square metres (1,550 sq ft), there are 14 floors and three platforms. It is located at 42°40′36″N 23°20′31″E, at 595 metres (1,952 ft) above sea level.

In 1962 the Borisova Gradina TV Tower was the place from which the first Bulgarian VHF radio broadcast (of the Bulgarian National Radio's Programme 1) was realized. Programme 2 of the BNR's broadcasting began in 1965, and Programme 3's in 1971. BNT's Kanal 1 transmitter was replaced with a more modern conforming to the OIRT colour television requirements in January 1972, and the broadcasting of Efir 2 began in 1975.

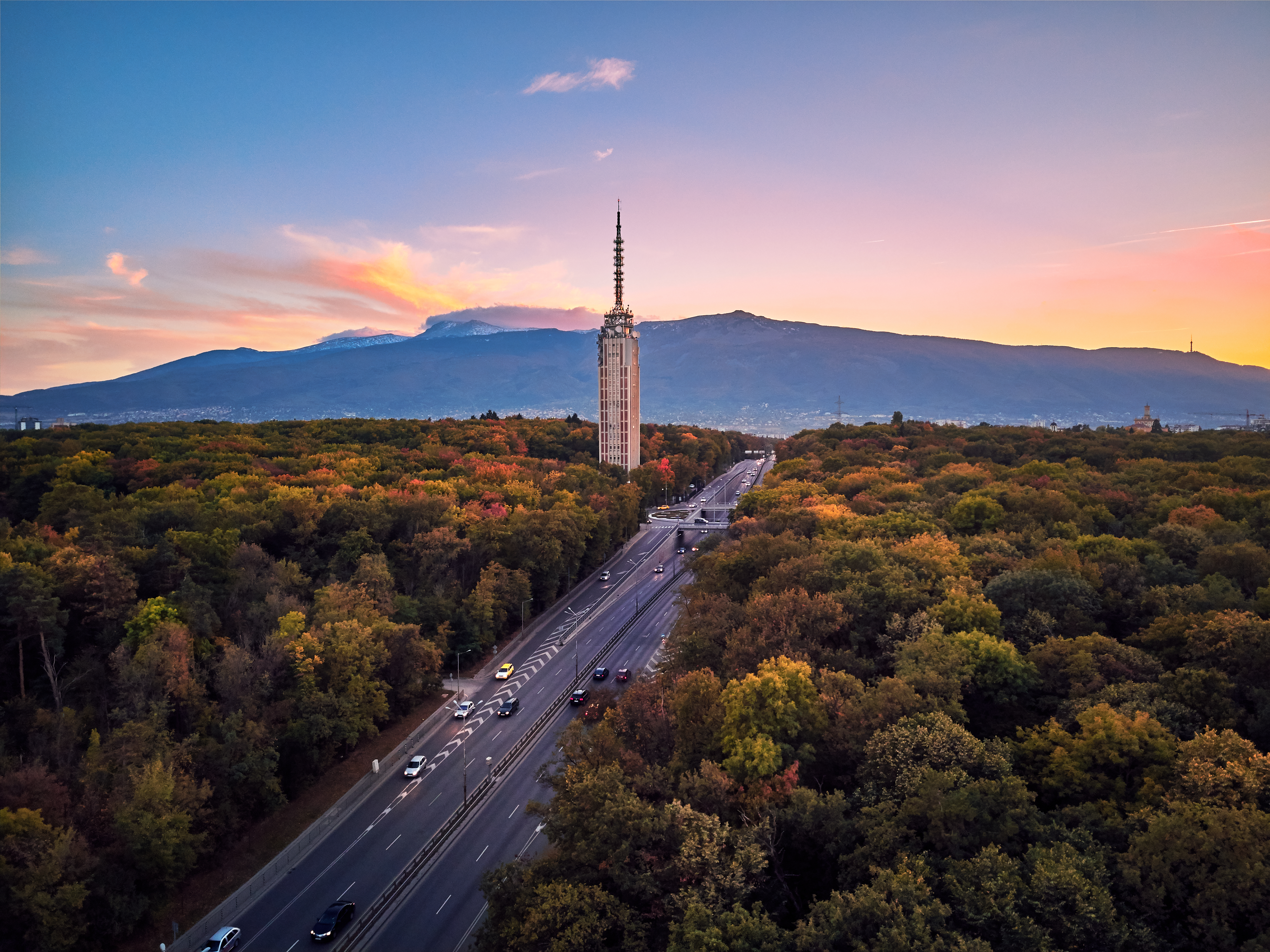

Since 1985 the newer Vitosha Mountain TV Tower has been the main facility for broadcasting television and the programs of the Bulgarian National Radio in and around Sofia. The Old TV Tower broadcasts private radio stations as well as DVB-T terrestrial television.

== See also ==
- List of tallest structures in Bulgaria
- List of tallest towers
