= Snezhanka (disambiguation) =

Snezhanka, alternatively transliterated Snejanka, may refer to:

- Snezhanka (cave), in the Rhodope mountains, Bulgaria.
- Snezhanka Peak
- Snezhanka Tower, a television tower near Pamporovo, Bulgaria.
- The Bulgarian version of the Tzatziki appetiser.
