= Toplofikatsiya Ruse =

Bulgarian heating company

- Native name: Bulgarian: Топлофикация Русе
- Company type: Subsidiary
- Headquarters: Ruse, Bulgaria
- Number of locations: 2 power stations
- Area served: Ruse
- Parent: Mechel (from 2011)
- Website: toplo-ruse.com

Toplofikatsiya Ruse (Bulgarian: Топлофикация Русе) is the district heating company in the city of Ruse in Northern Bulgaria. As of 2011, the company is owned by Russian company Mechel.

Toplofikatsiya Ruse has two power stations producing electricity and heat. The heat distribution network in Ruse has a total length of 79 km as of 2011, and serves over 18,000 customers.

Name	Heat energy capacity (MWt)	Heat energy output (2011) (MWth)	Electric capacity (MWe)	Electric output (2011) (MWeh)	Built	Notes
TEC Ruse East	624		400		1964	-
TEC Ruse West	41		–	–	1972	(bg)
Total	665		400		–	-

The first power station in Ruse, TEC Ruse, was a diesel power plant with an installed capacity of 6.4 MWe. It was built in 1917 with a capacity of 1.4 MWe, with a further 5 MWe added in 1949. It was brought out of exploitation in 1964.

== See also ==
- Energy in Bulgaria
