= Ruse TV Tower =

TV tower in Ruse, Bulgaria

Coordinates: 43°49′27″N 25°57′28″E

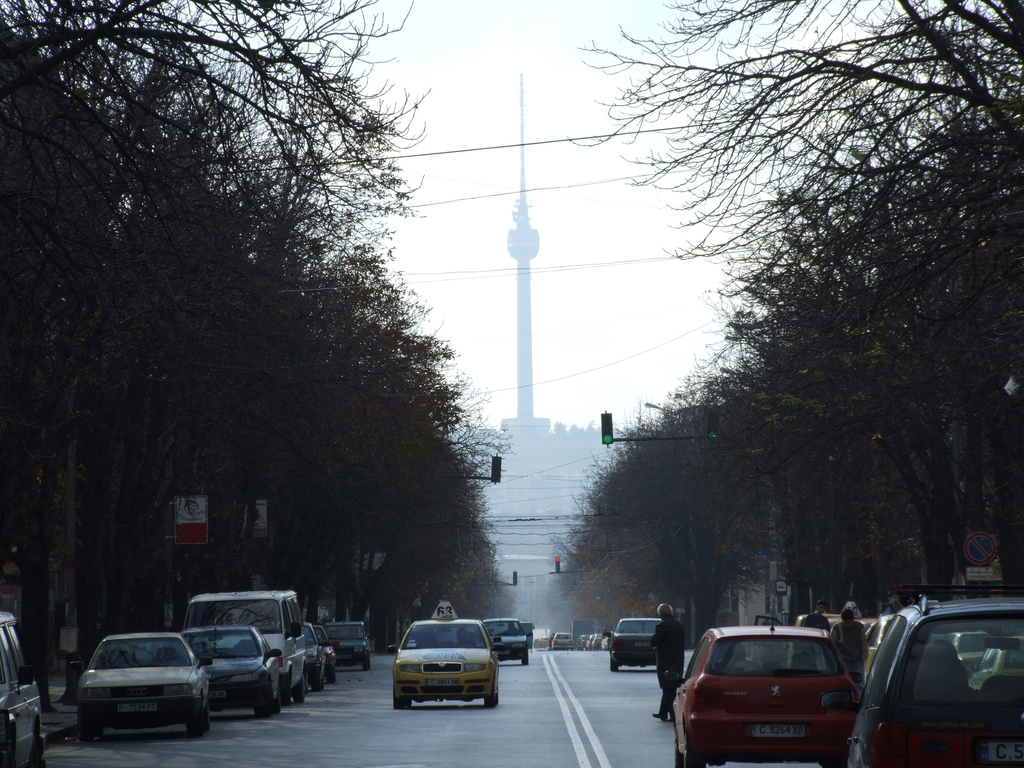
The Ruse TV Tower as seen from the city

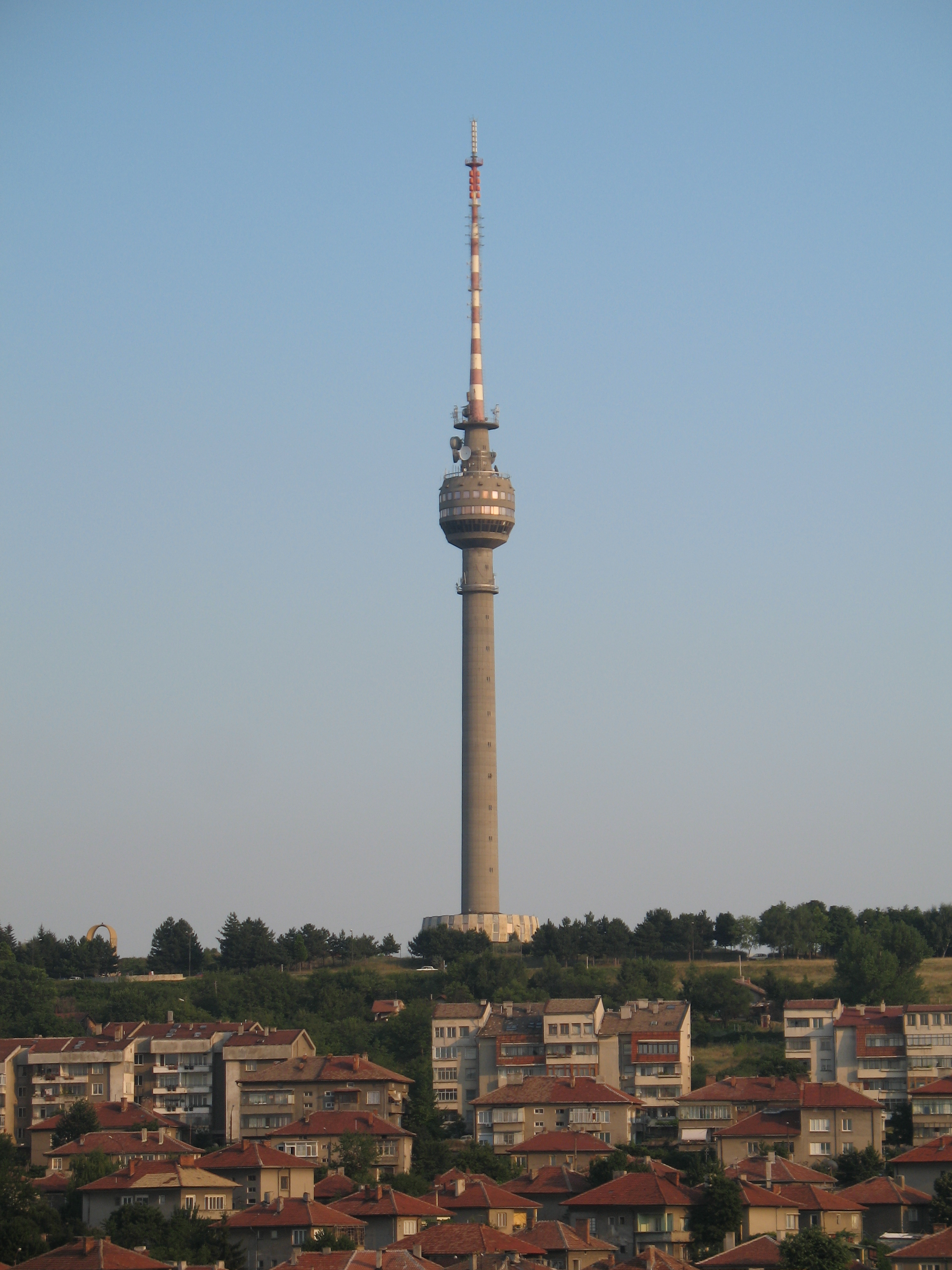
The Ruse TV Tower

The Ruse TV Tower is a 204-metre-high TV tower built of reinforced concrete at Ruse, Bulgaria. Originally, the structure was constructed as a 206-metre-high TV tower with a cafe/restaurant on top and was the tallest one on the Balkan Peninsula until 2001. In the 1990s an additional antenna was added bringing the height to 210 metres. And, in March 2007, the antenna was reconstructed bringing its height to 204 metres.

The Ruse TV Tower was built on the Leventa Hill, in 1986 and was launched on 7 May 1987 (under communist rule). Authors of the project were Stilyan Titkov, Evlogi Tsvetkov, Ivan Yantahtov and V. Vasilev. The newly built tower started broadcasting both Bulgarian Television and Soviet Television, as well as the three stations of Bulgarian National Radio – Horizont, Hristo Botev, and Orpheus (Bulgarian: Хоризонт, Христо Ботев и Орфей). Higher frequencies were coming into use during the following years, and the process of shutting down old transmitters was completed on 15 Aug 2004.

The tower had an observation deck open for tourists at a height of 107 metres, which offered a panoramic view of Ruse, the Danube river, the neighbouring city of Giurgiu, Romania, and as far as the Carpathian Mountains.

== See also ==
- List of towers
- List of tallest structures in Bulgaria

== Gallery ==
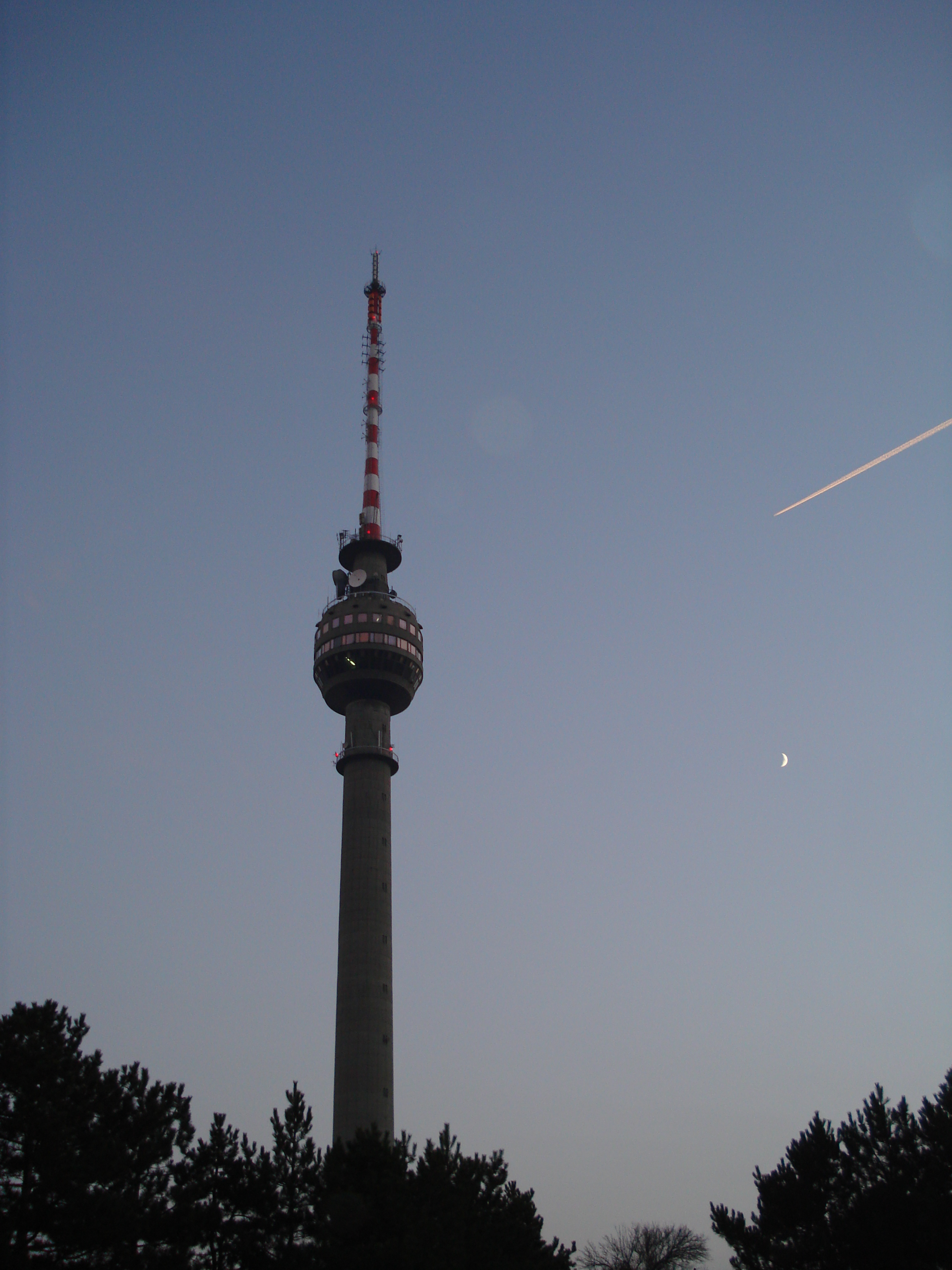
Ruse, Bulgaria – TV and Radio Broadcasting Tower

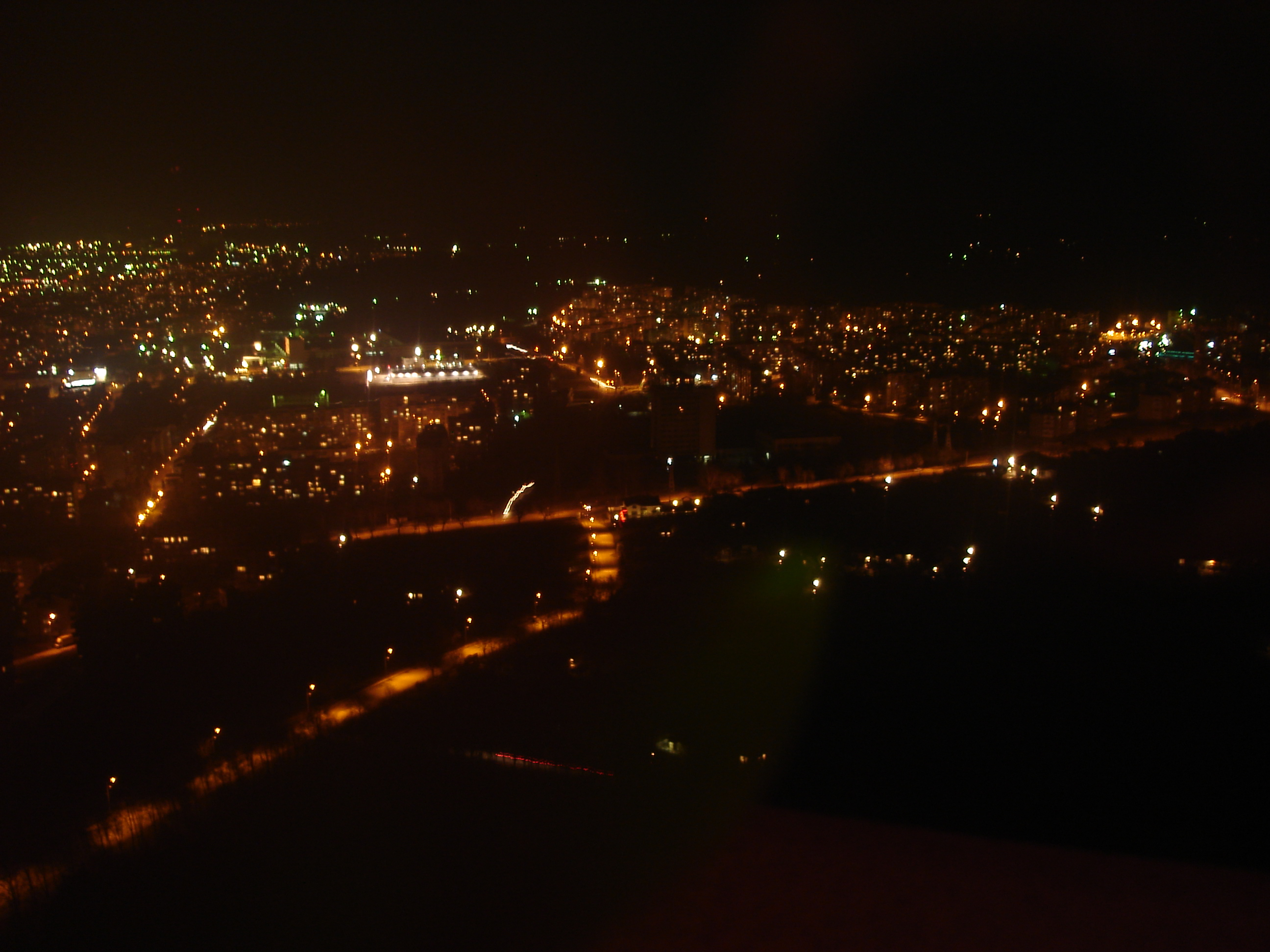
A night view of Ruse from its TV and Radio Broadcasting Tower

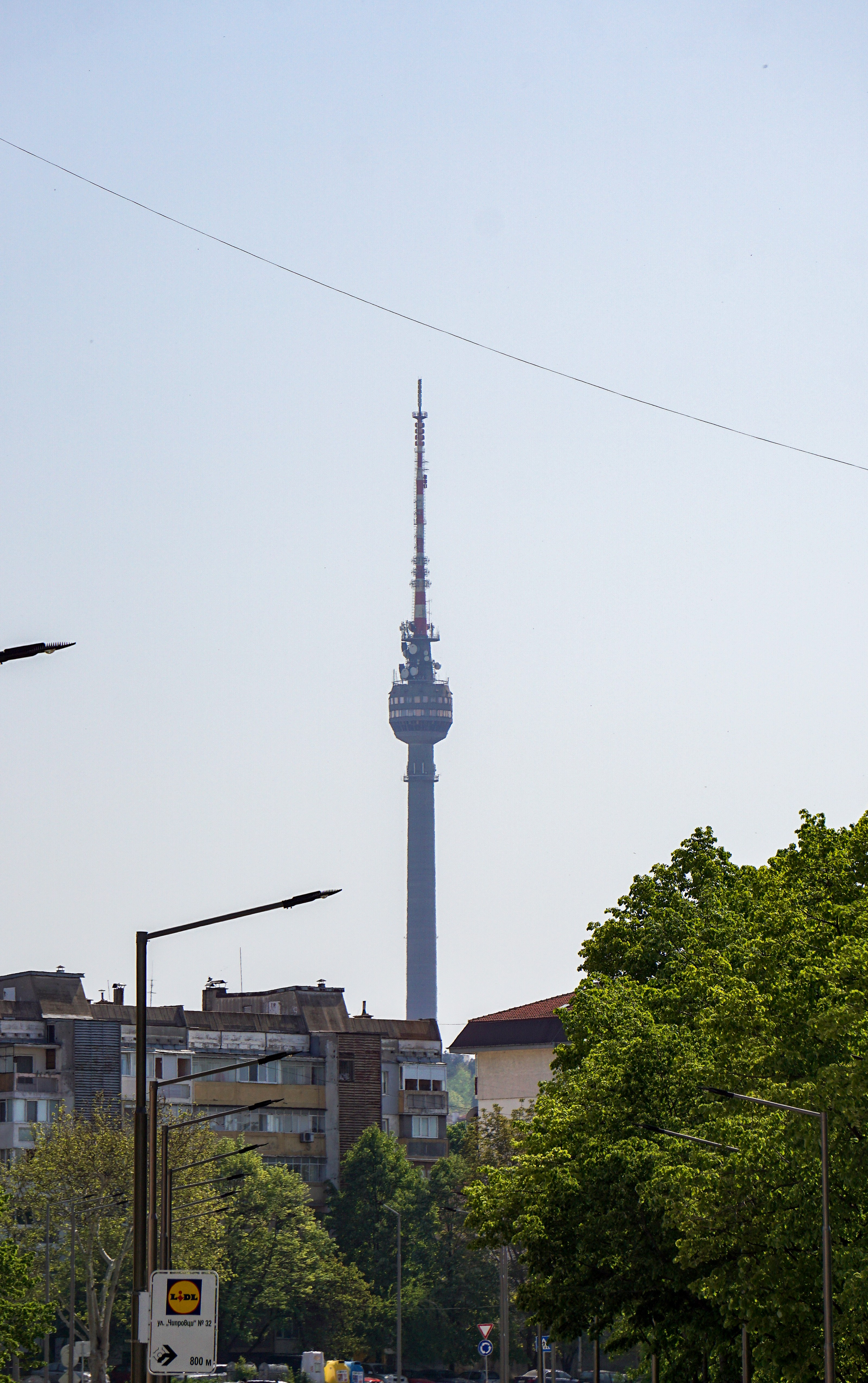
Seen from Rodina complex

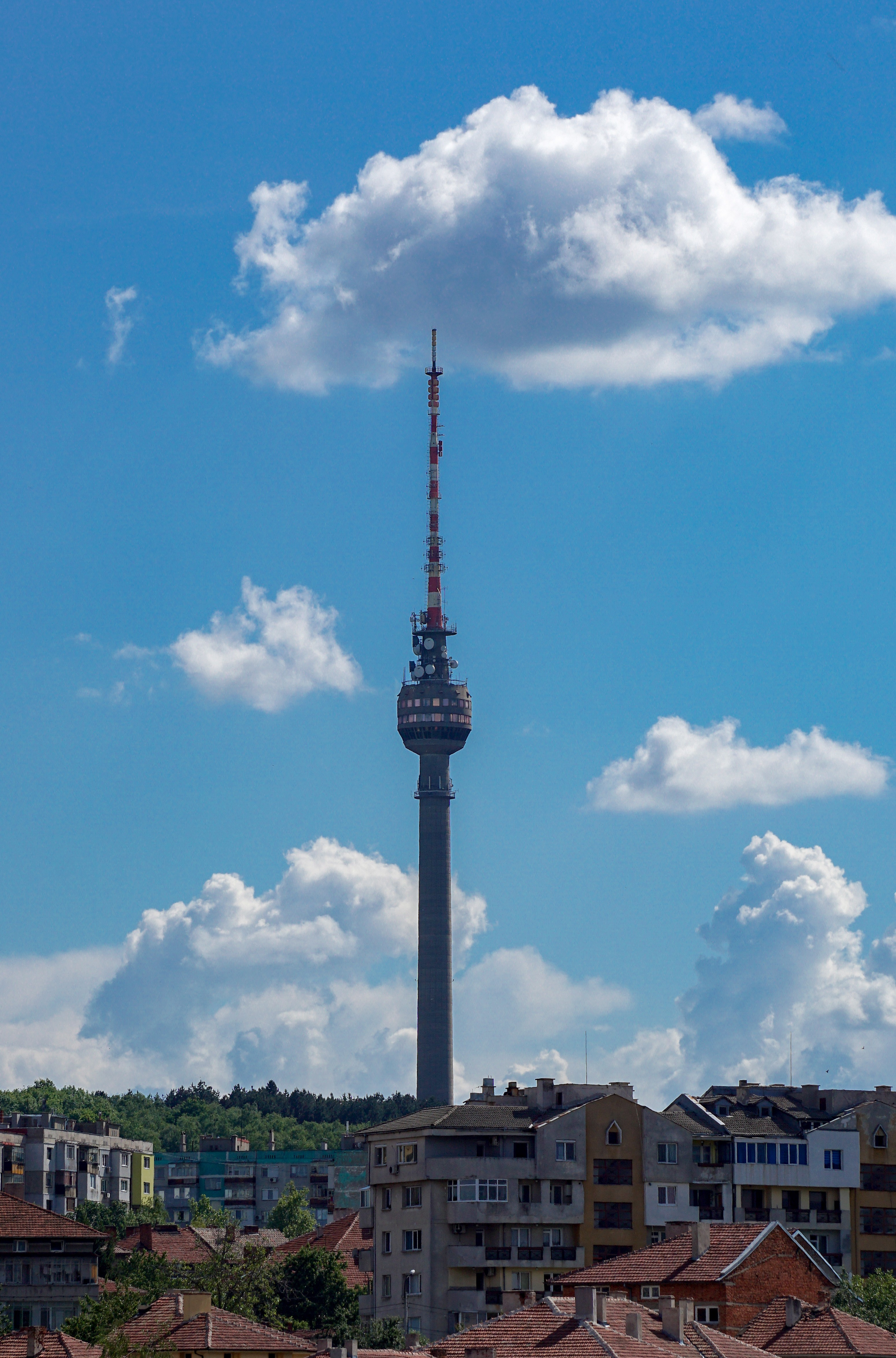
TV Tower Ruse

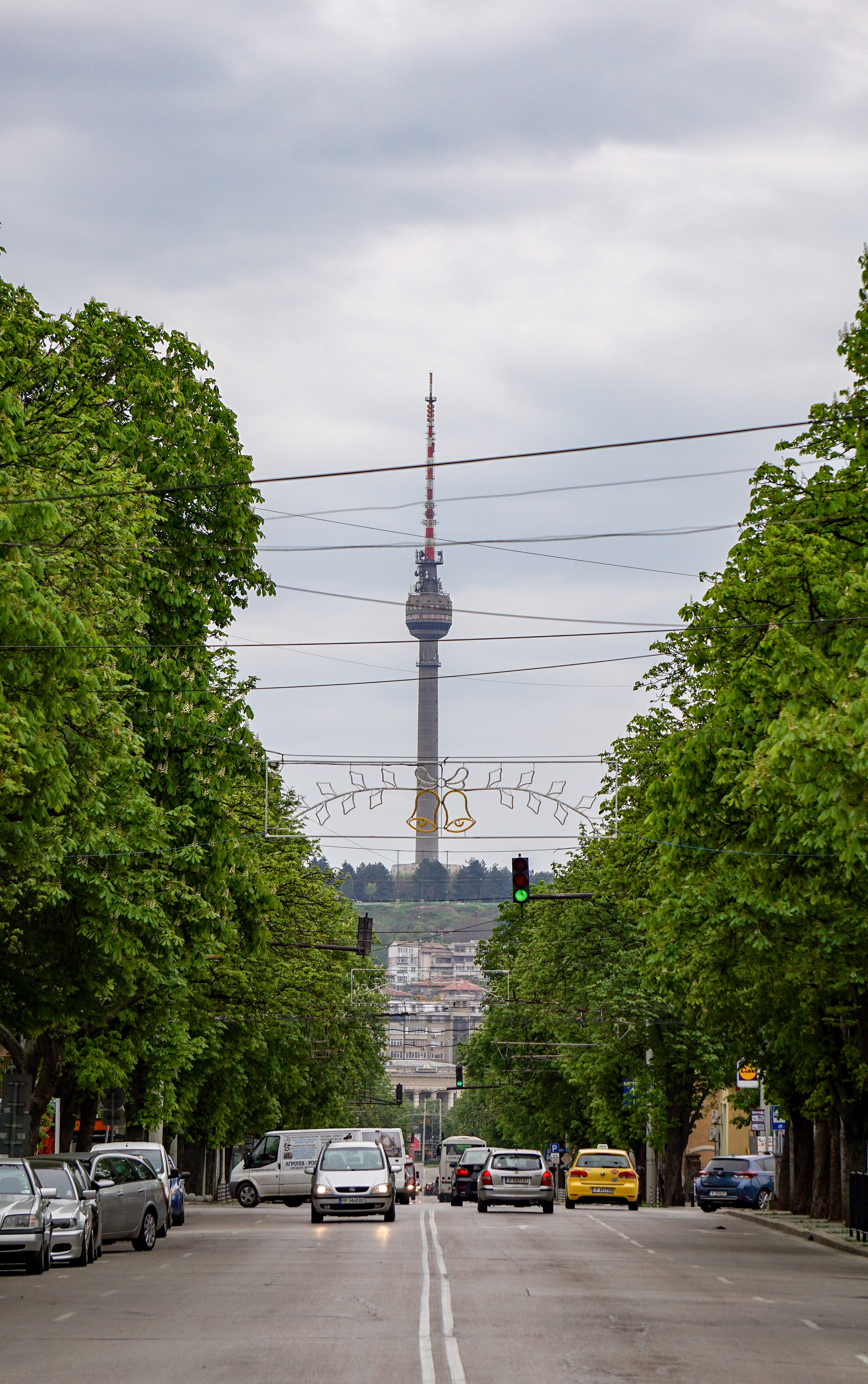
View from city center

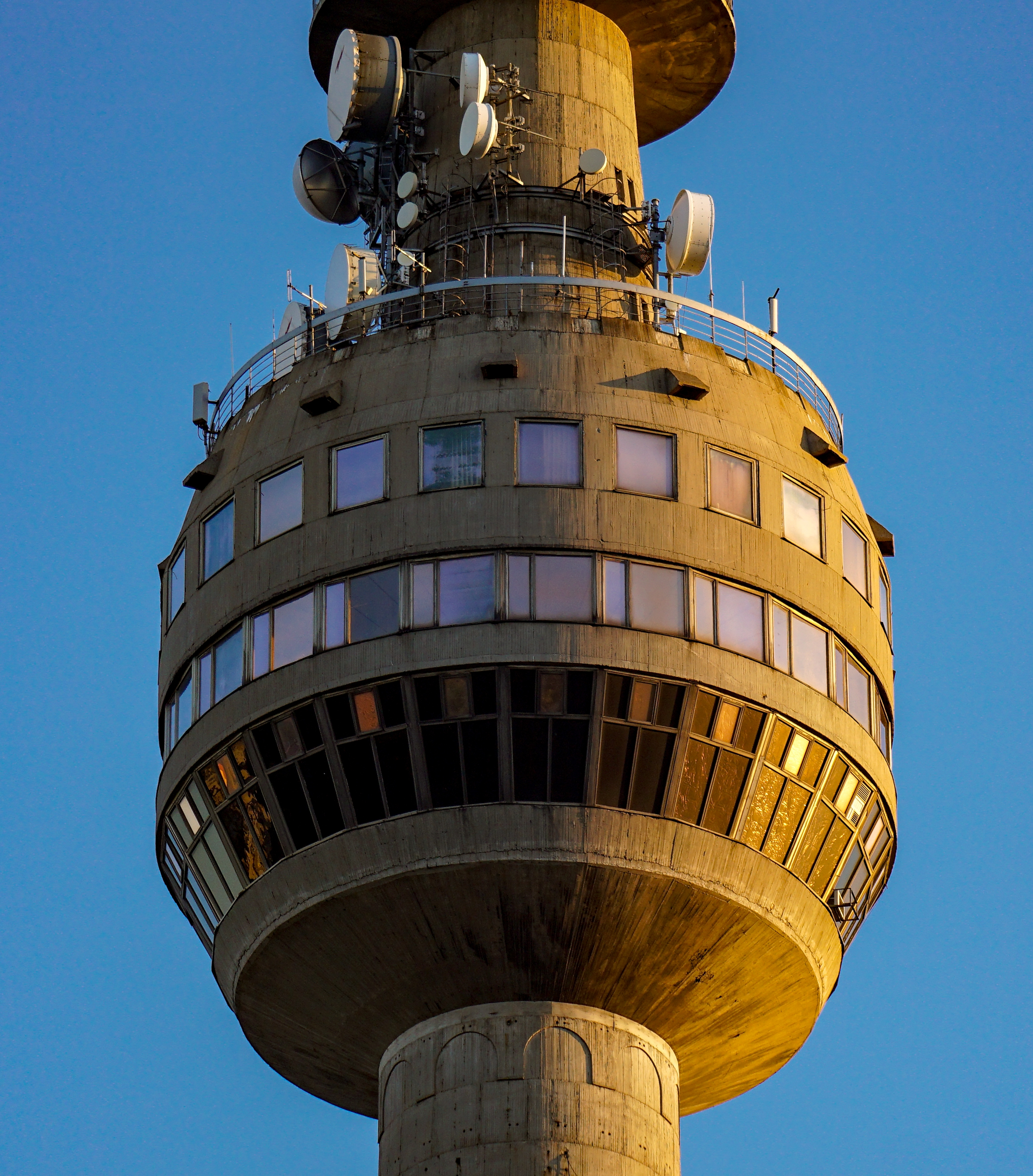
Close look
