= Adriana Budevska =

Bulgarian actress (1878–1955)

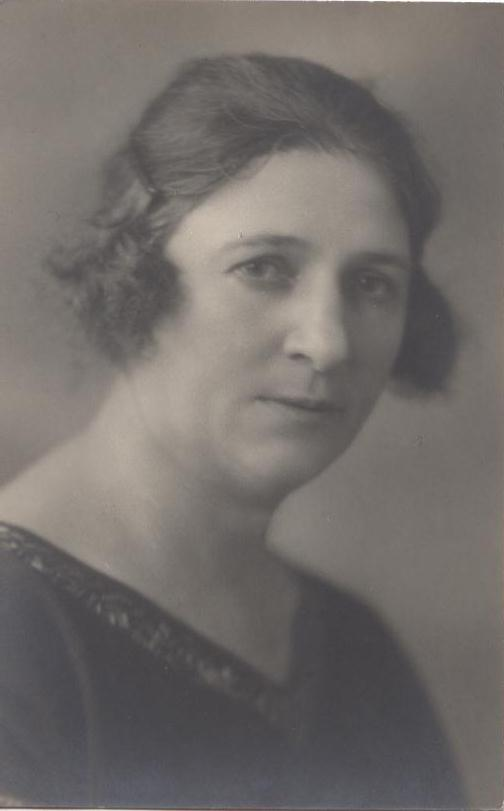
Adriana Budevska. Source: Bulgarian Archives State Agency

Adriana Budevska (13 December 1878 – 9 December 1955), was a Bulgarian actress, one of the founders of the professional theater in Bulgaria. She has been called one of the biggest Bulgarian interpretators of tragic roles.

== Life ==
She was born in Dobrich. She graduated from school in Varna.

In 1895, after a contest, she won a scholarship to study at the Mali theater in Moscow. After completing four years training she returned to Bulgaria in 1899, where she debuted in the role of Vassilis Melentieva in the eponymous play "Tear and Laughter" by A.N. Ostrovsky in the capital's theatre company.

From 1906 to 1926, she was active in the National Theatre. She married Hristo Ganev – one of the founders of Bagarskiya professional theater. In 1926, she was dismissed after more than 10 years as one of the prime creative forces, standing outside the scene, and in 1937, she went to South America with her son, not returning until 1948. On 20 February 1949, the community celebrated her 70th anniversary. Adriana Budevska contributed to the Bulgarian theater with the realistic traditions of Russian theater, and with the focus of classical repertoire.

She was the author of numerous articles, portraits of artists, memories. Some of her more noted roles where: Nina Zarechnaya, Mila, Price, Sonja, ConCon, Ophelia, Lady Macbeth, Nora, Mona Bath, Marguerite Gautier, Emilia gallons. She died in Sofia.
