= Pleven TV Tower =

Coordinates: 43°24′7″N 24°38′57″E

Pleven TV tower (best known as Miziya Tower) is a telecommunication tower in Pleven, Bulgaria. It is located east of the Druzhba quarter of the city. The tower was opened in the 1960s; with height of 107 meters it is the tallest building in the city.

== See also ==
- List of tallest structures in Bulgaria
