= Dobrich TV Tower =

Tower in Bulgaria

Coordinates: 43°32′56″N 27°48′58″E

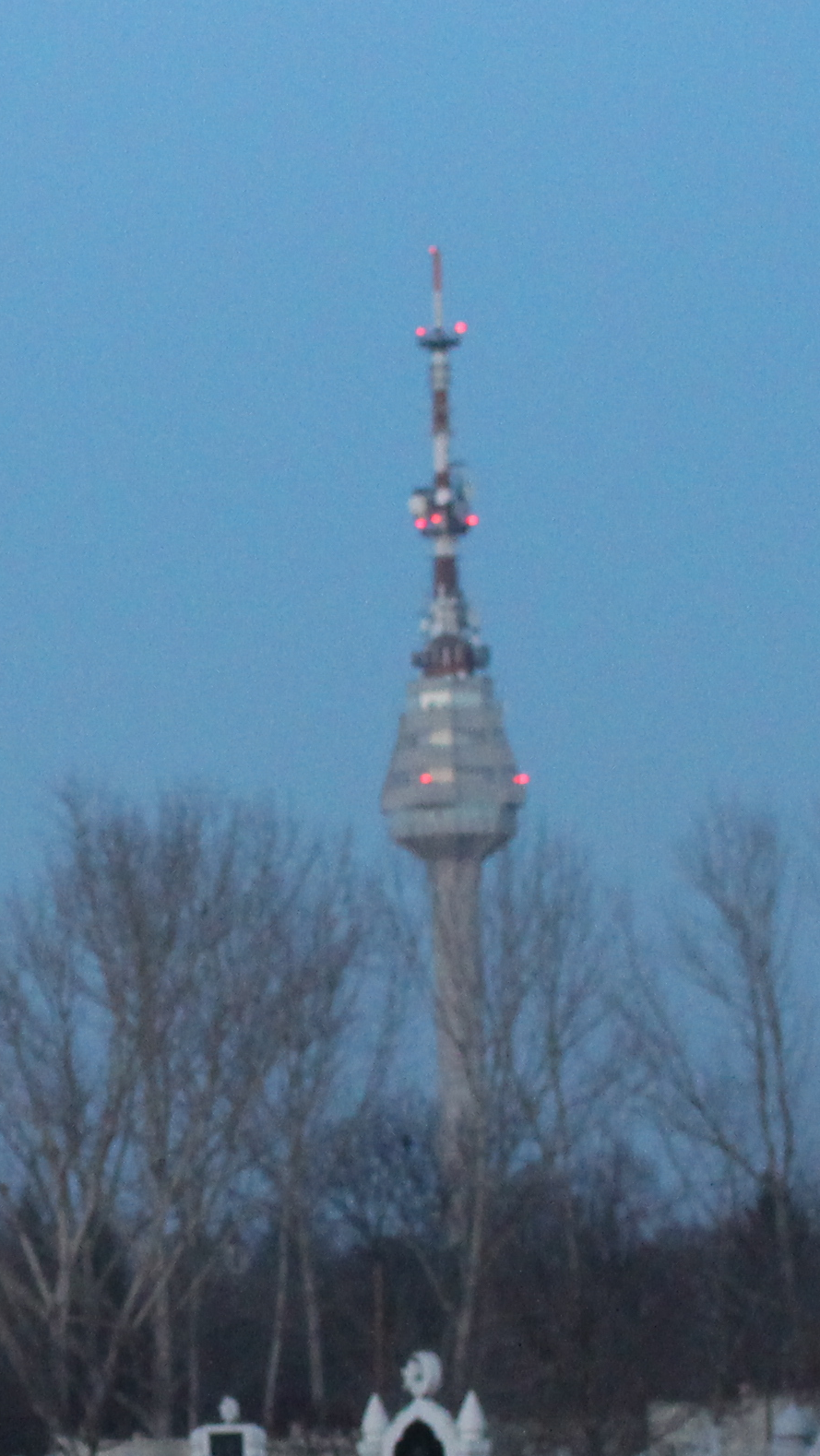
Dobrich TV Tower

Dobrich TV Tower is a 250-metre high TV tower built of reinforced concrete near Dobrich in Bulgaria. Dobrich TV Tower, which was designed by Petar Andreev, was completed in 1979 and has an observation deck open for tourists. The tower is located in the southern edge of the city, in between the Gaazi Baba and Prostor neighbourhoods, just northeast of Temple Arhangel Mihail and the cemetery connected to it.

== Dobrich AM transmitter ==
A few kilometres away from Dobrich TV Tower, there is a mediumwave broadcasting station, which was built in 2000. Its antenna uses a 190-metre tall guyed mast, insulated against the ground.

== See also ==
- List of tallest towers in the world
- List of tallest structures in Bulgaria
