= Ruse Iztok Power Plant =

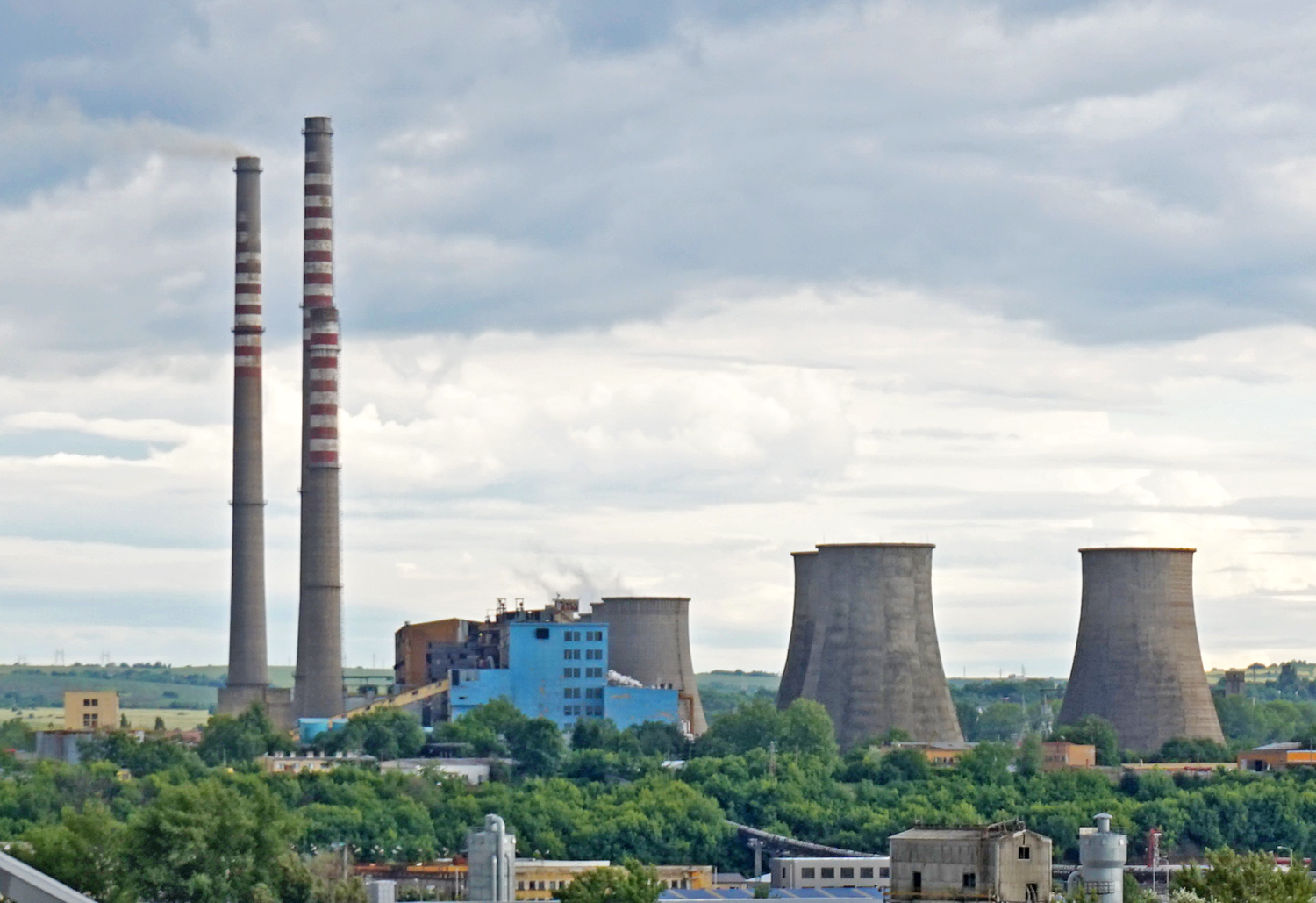
- Country: Bulgaria
- Location: Ruse
- Coordinates: 43°51′54″N 26°0′40″E
- Status: Operational
- Commission date: 1964
- Owner: Toplofikatsiya Ruse
- Cogeneration?: Yes

Power generation
- Nameplate capacity: 400 MW

External links
- Website: www.toplo-ruse.com

Ruse Iztok Thermal Power Plant (Bulgarian: ТЕЦ Русе Изток) is a power plant situated near the city of Ruse, Bulgaria. It has an installed capacity of 400 MW. It is owned by Holding Slovenske elektrarne. Ruse Iztok Power Plant has 3 chimneys, from which 2 have a height of 180 metres and 1 has a height of 140 metres.

== See also ==
- Energy in Bulgaria
