= Pamporovo =

Ski resort in Bulgaria

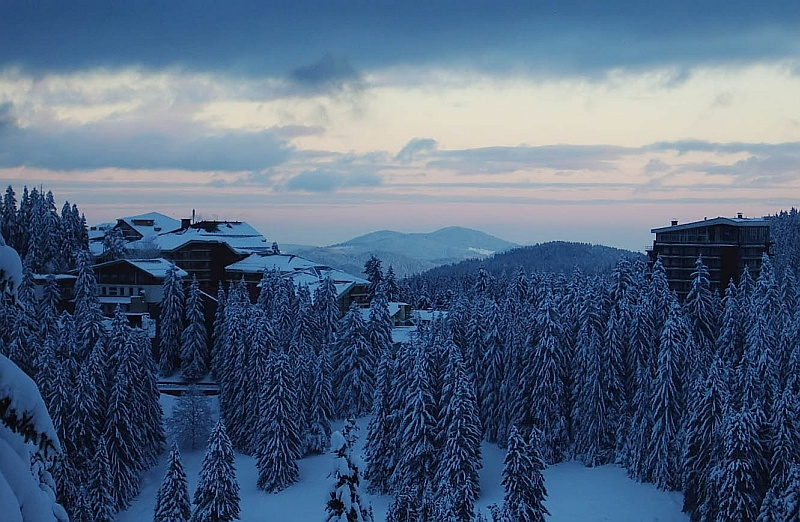
- Pamporovo in winter

- Location within Bulgaria
- Nearest city: Chepelare (10 km north), Smolyan (15 km south)
- Coordinates: 41°39′0″N 24°41′0″E
- Vertical: 508 m (1,667 ft)
- Top elevation: 1,928 m (6,325 ft)
- Base elevation: 1,420 m (4,660 ft); Stoykite ski centre 1,471 m (4,826 ft); Malina (ski centre 2)
- Trails: 13 (36.8 km (22.9 mi)): 27% easiest; 61% more difficult; 12% most difficult
- Longest run: Snezhanka 6 (Turisticheskata) 5.15 km (3.20 mi)
- Lift system: 6 chairs, 6 surface
- Lift capacity: 13,000 skiers/hr
- Snowmaking: yes (100%)
- Night skiing: no
- Website: Pamporovo

Pamporovo (Bulgarian: Пампорово, pronunciation: /pam'porovo/) is a popular ski resort in Smolyan Province, southern Bulgaria. It is set amongst Norway spruce forests and is primarily visited during the winter for skiing and snowboarding. It is also a popular tourist place in summer. The hub of Pamporovo comprises a number of hotels and bars. It is a family-friendly resort and suited for complete beginners and intermediates.

== Location ==
The resort is set in the southern Rhodope Mountains at an altitude of 1620 meters above sea level. The highest peak in the area, Snezhanka Peak (Bulgarian: Снежанка) at 1928 m, is several hundred meters above the resort and hosts Snezhanka Tower. Pamporovo is around 260 km away from Sofia, 85 km south of Plovdiv, 15 km north of Smolyan, and 10 km south of Chepelare.

== Skiing ==
The resort has 55 km of ski-runs and 38 km of cross-country skiing tracks served by 18 lifts with a total capacity of 13,000 persons per hour. Seven snow-levelling machines and 90% covered with snow cannons guarantee skiers comfortable and enjoyable downhill rides. More than 100 highly qualified ski instructors, fluent in various languages, are available to aid both beginners and intermediate skiers as well as snowboarders. Some new runs have been created and there is now another chairlift in operation Servicing the new Stoykite ski runs and a T-bar replaced with a fixed grip 4 Man chairlift.

== Climate ==
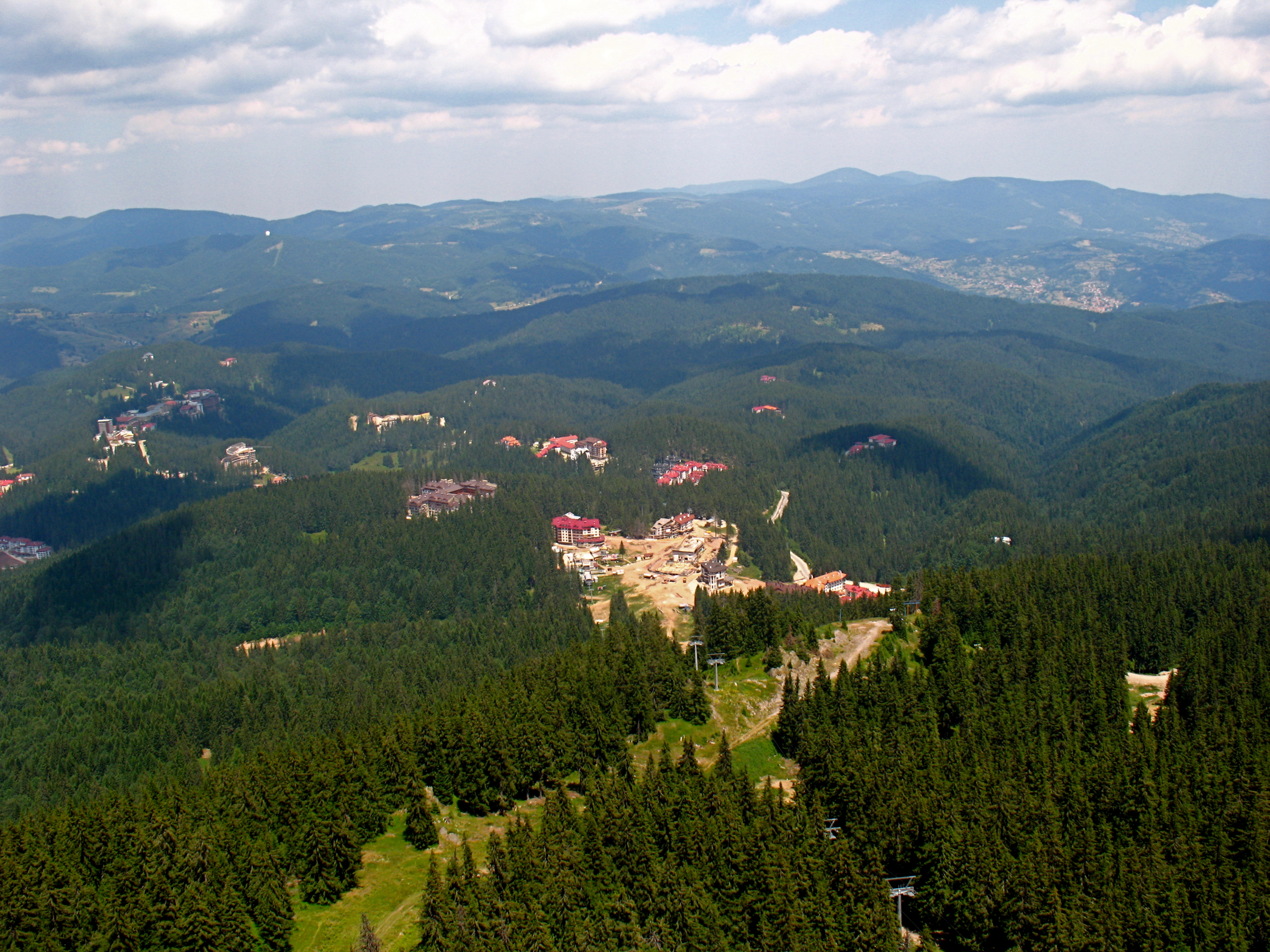
Aerial view of Pamporovo in summer

The winters in Pamporovo tend to be only moderately cold. The average January temperature is −3 degrees Celsius (or 26.6 F).

== Development ==
Much of the older development of the Pamporovo resort lies to the northeast of Snezhanka. Now, to the south there is an up-market residential development called the Pine Lodge, adjacent to the Smolyan Lakes ski lift. There are plans afoot to build two golf courses and to extend the whole skiing area to the Perelik mountain. The Pine Lodge faces the south towards the land of Spartacus, within neighbouring Greece; and a new EU-funded highway will make the Greek coast accessible by car.

In January 2010 an additional border crossing point was opened between Bulgaria and Greece which is just half an hour drive from Pamporovo by car. This brought considerable attention by tourists and media to the resort as being the only one in Europe to allow for such a short time to switch from skiing to swimming.
