= Dobrich =

Dobrich Добрич
- City
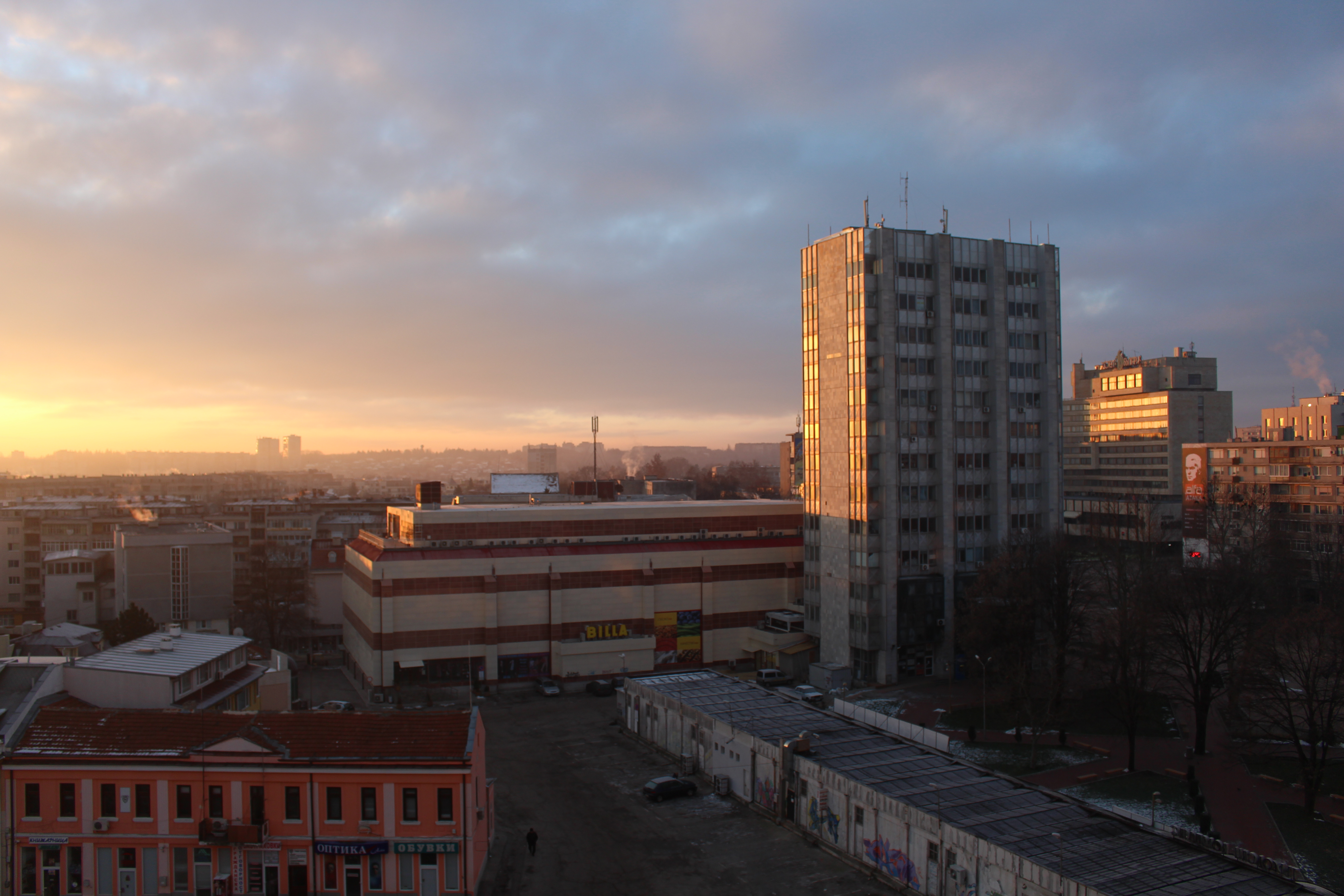
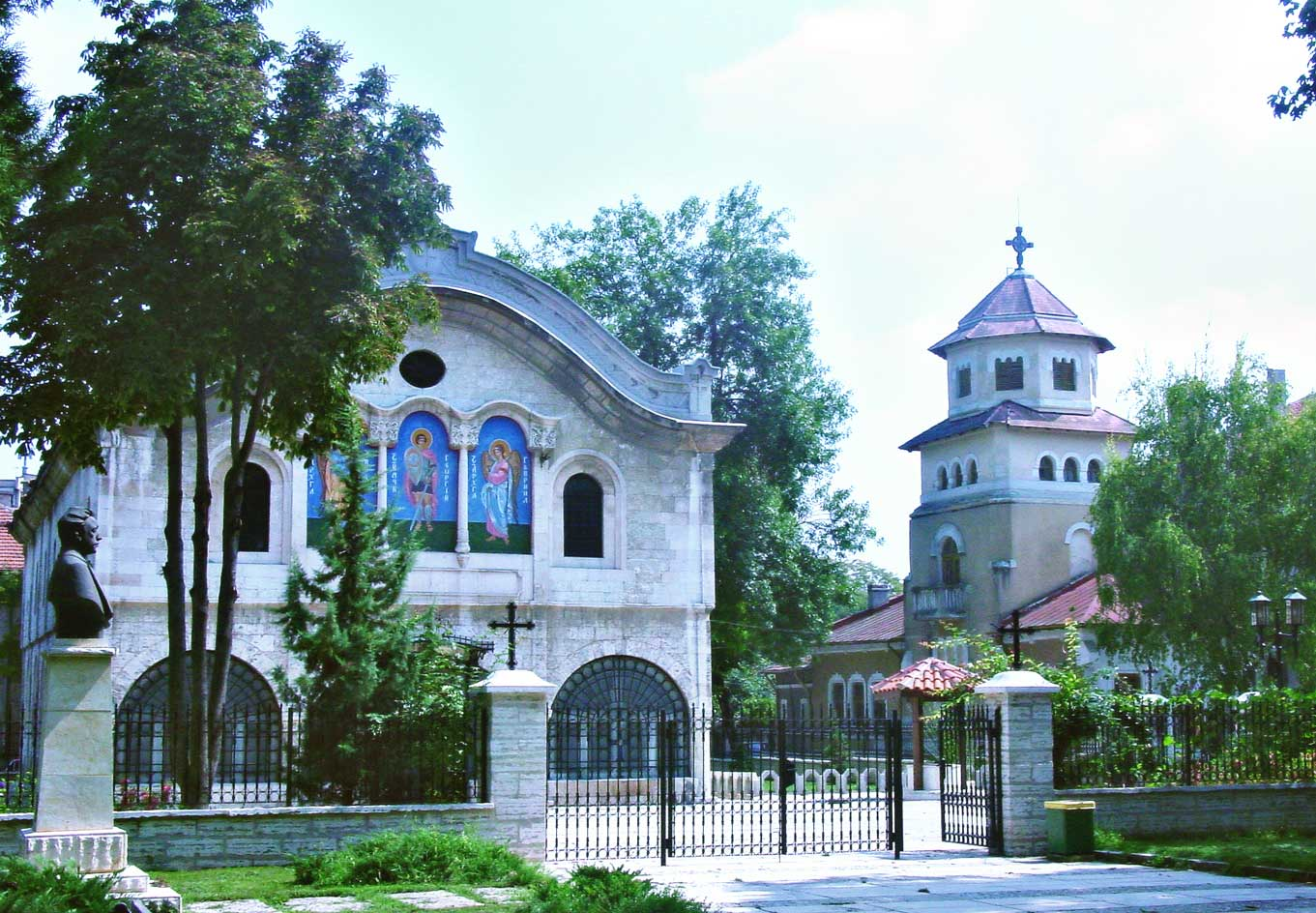
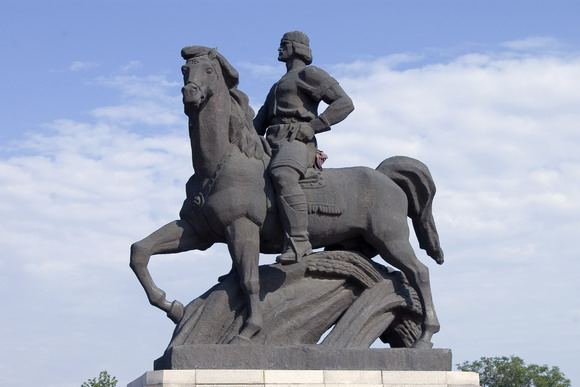
- From the top, A view of the city center, Saint George Church, Dobrotica Monument

- Flag Coat of arms

- Location of Dobrich Dobrich (Balkans)
- Coordinates: 43°34′N 27°50′E
- Country: Bulgaria
- Province (Oblast): Dobrich

Government
  - Mayor: Yordan Yordanov

Area
  - Total: 109.018 km^{2} (42.092 sq mi)
- Elevation: 225 m (738 ft)

Population (2024)
  - Total: 69,434
  - Density: 636.90/km^{2} (1,649.6/sq mi)
- Time zone: UTC+2 (EET)
  - Summer (DST): UTC+3 (EEST)
- Postal Code: 9300
- Area code: 058
- Website: Official website

Dobrich (Bulgarian: Добрич [ˈdɔbrit͡ʃ]) is the 9th-largest city in Bulgaria, the administrative centre of Dobrich Province and the capital of the region of Southern Dobrudzha. It is located in the northeastern part of the country, 30 km west of the Bulgarian Black Sea Coast, not far from resorts such as Albena, Balchik, and Golden Sands. In January 2012, Dobrich was inhabited by 79,269 people within the city limits. The city is named after the Bulgarian medieval lord of the surrounding region - Dobrotitsa. Agriculture is the most developed branch of the economy. The most popular types of agricultural products in the region are wheat and lavender oil.

Dobrich Knoll on Livingston Island in the South Shetland Islands, Antarctica is named after Dobrich. A point of interest is the Dobrich TV Tower.

== Etymology ==
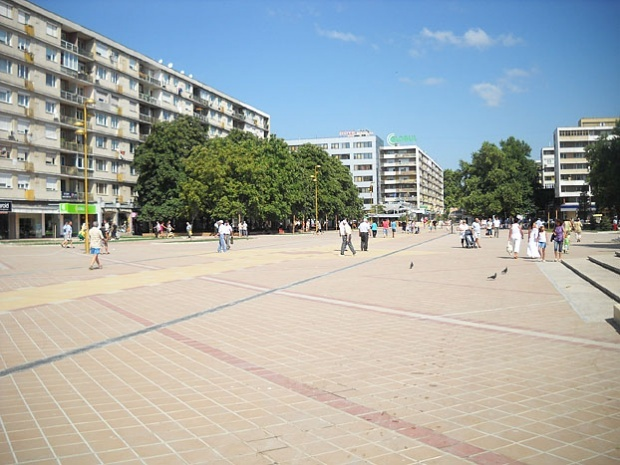
Svoboda square

The city is named after the 14th-century Dobrujan ruler Dobrotitsa, from the Slavic root dobr, "good".

The city has had several name changes throughout its history. When the town was founded in the 16th century during the Ottoman period, it bore the name Hacıoğlu Pazarcık after the Turkish travelling merchant who established the settlement, and to distinguish it from the larger town of Pazarcık (today Pazardzhik).

After the autonomous Bulgarian state was established, the citizens of the town voted to change the name to Dobrich on 19 February 1882. When Romania annexed Southern Dobruja in 1913 after the Second Balkan War, the city was known as Bazargic, the Romanian variant of its earlier Turkish name.

On 25 September 1940, per the Treaty of Craiova, the city reverted to Bulgarian rule and "Dobrich" became the name once again. In 1949, during the Communist era, the city was renamed Tolbukhin in honour of Soviet Marshal Fyodor Tolbukhin. Finally, after the end of the Zhivkov regime, the name of the city was changed back to "Dobrich" by presidential decree on 19 September 1990.

== History ==
The first evidence of settlement in what is now Dobrich dates from the 4th or 3rd century BC. Under the Latin name Abrittum, it was a city of the Roman province of Moesia Inferior, important enough to become a suffragan bishopric of the Metropolitan of the capital, Marcianopolis, but the Catholic diocese faded later. Ruins from 2nd to 4th centuries AD and the 7th to 11th centuries have also been found, including a Bulgar necropolis featuring pagan graves in the centre of the city.

During the 11th century, Pecheneg invasions devastated the interior of Dobruja, leaving many settlements in the region uninhabited at the time of the Second Bulgarian Empire.

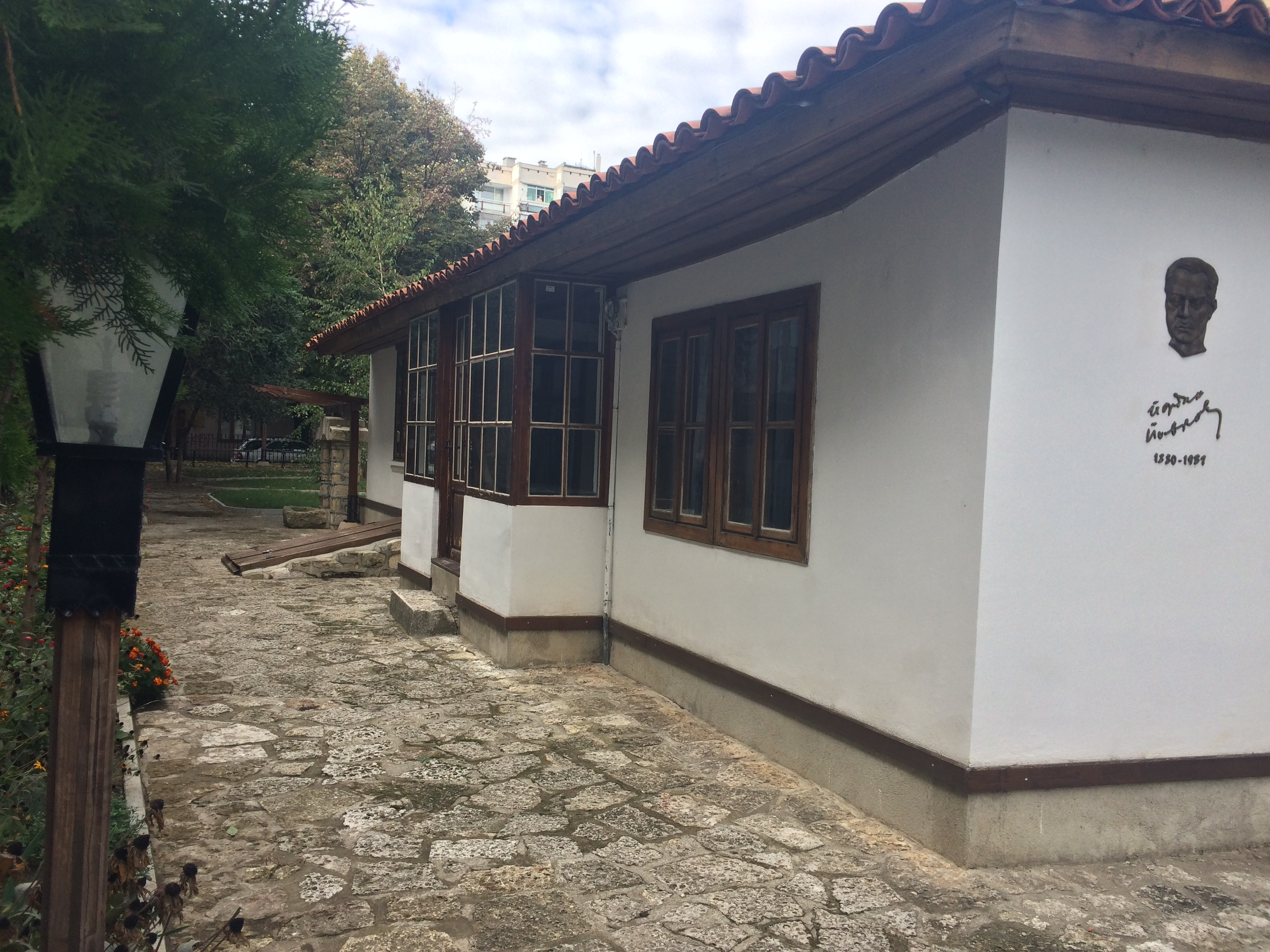
Museum of Yordan Yovkov

The settlement was founded for a second time in the 16th century by the Turkish merchant Hacıoğlu Pazarcık, whose name it bore until 1882. According to Ottoman data from 1646–1650, there were over 1,000 houses in the city, about 100 shops, three inns, three hammams, twelve mosques and twelve schools. From the 17th to the 19th century, the city developed as a handicraft, trade and agricultural centre, being famous for its weaving, homespun tailoring, coppersmith's trade, leather-work and agricultural products, such as wheat, linseed, wool and cheese. At the beginning of the 19th century, the city's population reached 12,000, many of whom refugees from eastern Bulgaria after the Russo-Turkish Wars. The cultural appearance of the city was also formed. The first Orthodox church was built in 1843. The city was liberated from the Ottoman Empire on 27 January 1878 and renamed Dobrich on 19 February 1882.

After the Treaty of Bucharest of 1913 (confirmed by the Treaty of Neuilly of 1919), Dobrich and the whole of Southern Dobruja were incorporated in Romania for a period until 1940. During that time, the city bore the name Bazargic, which is a transformation of the earlier Turkish name Hacıoğlu Pazarcık, and was centre of Caliacra County (județ in Romanian). On 25 September 1940, the Bulgarian army marched into the city after signing Treaty of Craiova on September 7, 1940; date celebrated as the city's holiday, later changed to September 25.

In 1949, during the period of Communist rule, Dobrich was renamed Tolbukhin (Толбухин) after Marshal of the Soviet Union Fyodor Tolbukhin. On 19 September 1990, a presidential decree restored the city's old name of Dobrich. Despite the renewing of the name Dobrich architecturally maintains an ex-communist outlook even in the 21st century. The vehicle registration plate code for the region has also remained unchanged; it is the abbreviation TX (from ТолбуХин; Тolbukhin).

== Geography ==
Dobrich is located in the northeastern part of the country, 30 km west of the Bulgarian Black Sea Coast, not far from resorts such as Albena, Balchik, and Golden Sands.

=== Climate ===
Climate data for Dobrich
Month	Jan	Feb	Mar	Apr	May	Jun	Jul	Aug	Sep	Oct	Nov	Dec	Year
Mean daily maximum °C (°F)	5.4 (41.7)	7.1 (44.8)	12.9 (55.2)	18.3 (64.9)	23.2 (73.8)	26.7 (80.1)	29.8 (85.6)	29.9 (85.8)	25.1 (77.2)	19.0 (66.2)	12.5 (54.5)	6.3 (43.3)	18.0 (64.4)
Daily mean °C (°F)	1.2 (34.2)	2.7 (36.9)	7.4 (45.3)	12.7 (54.9)	18.2 (64.8)	21.7 (71.1)	24.2 (75.6)	24.2 (75.6)	20.0 (68.0)	14.0 (57.2)	8.5 (47.3)	3.2 (37.8)	13.2 (55.8)
Mean daily minimum °C (°F)	−1.9 (28.6)	−0.6 (30.9)	2.0 (35.6)	7.1 (44.8)	12.3 (54.1)	15.8 (60.4)	17.7 (63.9)	17.5 (63.5)	13.9 (57.0)	9.0 (48.2)	4.5 (40.1)	1.2 (34.2)	8.2 (46.8)
Average precipitation mm (inches)	40 (1.6)	35 (1.4)	35 (1.4)	46 (1.8)	51 (2.0)	56 (2.2)	47 (1.9)	39 (1.5)	42 (1.7)	39 (1.5)	55 (2.2)	52 (2.0)	537 (21.1)
Source: Climate-data

=== Ecology ===
==== Air ====
In the municipality of Dobrich, the quality of atmospheric air is monitored by the mobile station for emission control of the Regional Inspectorate for the Environment and Water Resources (RIEWR) - Varna. The station is equipped with automatic monitoring devices measuring the quantities of carbon oxide, ozone, nitrogen oxides, sulfuric dioxide, and fine dust particles. The municipality is implementing a program for decreasing the quantities of dust particles, which was adopted by the municipal council in 2003.

==== Water resources ====
Surface water resources are insufficient in the region, with often water shortages. The town is supplied with water from drill wells and water catchment areas located near the town. Eight pumping stations provide bacteria-free drinking water which does not need further treatment. The water sources are in constant operation. A security area surrounds each source, and the water distribution is controlled by computers. The municipality boasts a complete water supply network.

==== Green areas ====
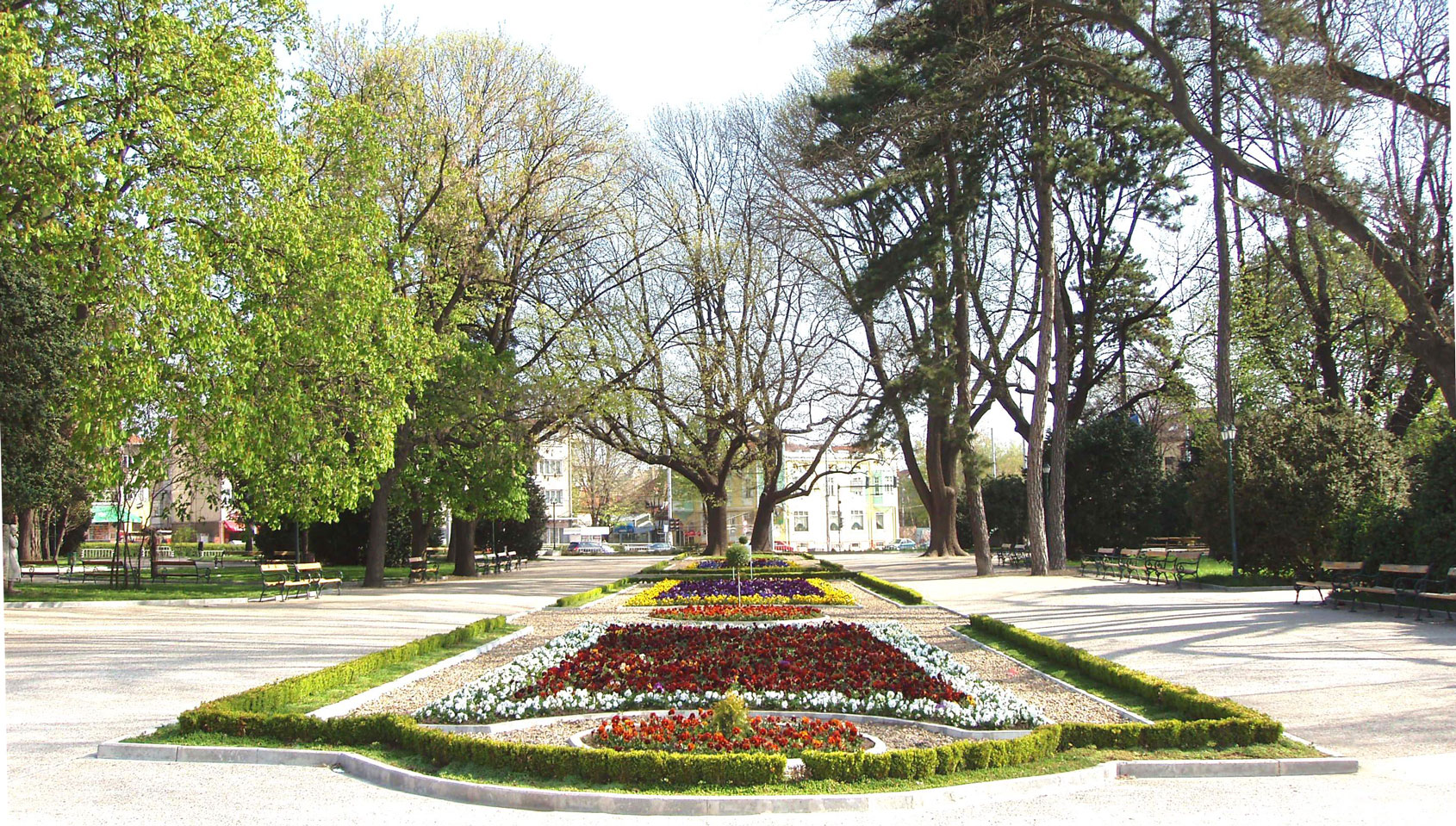
City Park "St. George"

The municipal Green System Plan examines the status of the existing urban and suburban green areas, as well as the variety of the plant species. The Green System includes the following categories of green areas: public parks and gardens, special parks and gardens, sanitary/protective greening, transportation greening (streets and roads), and limited-usage greening.

== Economy ==
Today Dobrich is a modern industrial-agricultural and transport center of the Dobrudzha region, one of the ten largest cities in Bulgaria - an important cultural, economic and administrative center in the northeastern economic region of the country. The economic profile of Dobrich is determined by the food industry, which provides over 50% of the volume of urban industry, as well as light industry. The rich agricultural area provides valuable raw materials.

The specific features of the region are a prerequisite for the development of agriculture as one of the priority sectors in the economy of the district. Dobrich produces high quality products, which are processed on site and are competitive on both domestic and foreign markets. The arable agricultural land in the territory of the municipality is 7700 ha. The main crops are wheat, corn, sunflower. The structure-determining branch in the municipality is the food industry. The share in the national scale in the production of dairy products, bread and confectionery, oil and margarine, wines and spirits is solid. The city hosts the largest agricultural exhibition in the country, "Agriculture and everything about it." A significant share of the city's economy is occupied by light industry with the production of men's and women's clothing, furniture, fabrics, leather, jacquard products.

The favorable combination of natural and climatic conditions in the region are a real prerequisite for the high level of agricultural development. It has always been and is now also one of the priority sectors in the district's economy. Apart from being the center of a large agricultural region, the municipality of Dobrich has an industrial complex. The city has developed the branches of the food industry / production of dairy products, sausages, pasta, wines and spirits, soft drinks; poultry meat products, flour, bread and confectionery /, light industry / production of men's and women's clothing, leather clothing, furniture and footwear /, mechanical engineering / production of batteries, machinery and equipment for milk processing, semi-trailers and containers, agricultural machinery, radiators and filters for cars and trucks, plastic products /, construction / construction of buildings and facilities, design, civil and industrial construction /. Another form of trade development is the organization of annual fairs and exhibitions on a national and international scale, such as "Agriculture and everything about it", "National Exchange for Seeds and Seedlings", "Beekeeping", "Trade, wines and delicacies", "Made in Bulgaria", as the role of "Dobrich Fair" AD is essential for their successful implementation.

=== Agriculture ===
Agriculture is the most developed branch of the economy. The main reason for this is the environment – climate, soils and clean lands. 81% of all the land in Dobrich is agricultural, almost 4,000,000 decares. More than 70% of it is cultivated, which makes Dobrich №1 cultivated region in the country. Farming, plant-growing and stock-breeding are the most important part of the economy in Dobrich. Dobrudja territory, called the “granary of Bulgaria” is part of the district. Some of the end products made in Dobrich are: bread and flour products, all kinds of sausages, milk and dairy products, poultry products, margarine and vegetable oils, wine, soft drinks. The biggest bird-farm is located in the district. Other factories of great importance are the milk factory (one of the biggest factories in Bulgaria), the bread factory (one of the biggest factories in Bulgaria). Additional important products from other industries are cement, electric appliances, clothes, confection, furniture, car batteries, containers and there are many other factories from the food and beverage industry.

=== Gasification ===
The municipal strategy provides that the household, utility and industrial sectors be supplied with gas under a project for gasification. The network of gas pipelines has been extended to 43,808 metres. Currently they are working on the gasification of the residential areas. All municipal establishments from the educational, administrative, healthcare and social service sectors have already been covered by the gas supply network.

==== Communications ====
Dobrich has six offices for postal services. They cover the whole territory of the town thus meeting the needs of the community. The municipality of Dobrich is wired by two local landline telecommunication networks which operate four analogue and one digital exchanges.

== Demographics ==
As of the 2021 census, Dobrich is inhabited by 73,895 people within the settlement's limits. The number of the residents of the city (not the municipality) reached its peak in the period 1986-1991 when exceeded 110,000.

Historical population
Year	Pop.	±%
1887	10,717	—
1900	13,436	+25.4%
1910	17,146	+27.6%
1934	29,938	+74.6%
1946	30,522	+2.0%
1956	42,661	+39.8%
1965	55,150	+29.3%
1975	86,446	+56.7%
1985	109,066	+26.2%
1992	104,494	−4.2%
2001	100,000	−4.3%
2011	91,030	−9.0%
2021	73,895	−18.8%

=== Ethnic and religious composition ===
According to the latest 2011 census data, the individuals declared their ethnic identity were distributed as follows:

- Bulgarians: 73,657 (87.5%)
- Turks: 6,795 (8.1%)
- Roma: 2,482 (2.9%)
- Others: 528 (0.6%)
- Indefinable: 708 (0.8%)
  - Undeclared: 6,860 (7.5%)

Total: 91,030

The percentage of Orthodox Christians, according to the 2001 census data, is 86%, whereas around 10% of the population are adherents of the Muslim faith.

==== Church "St. George" ====
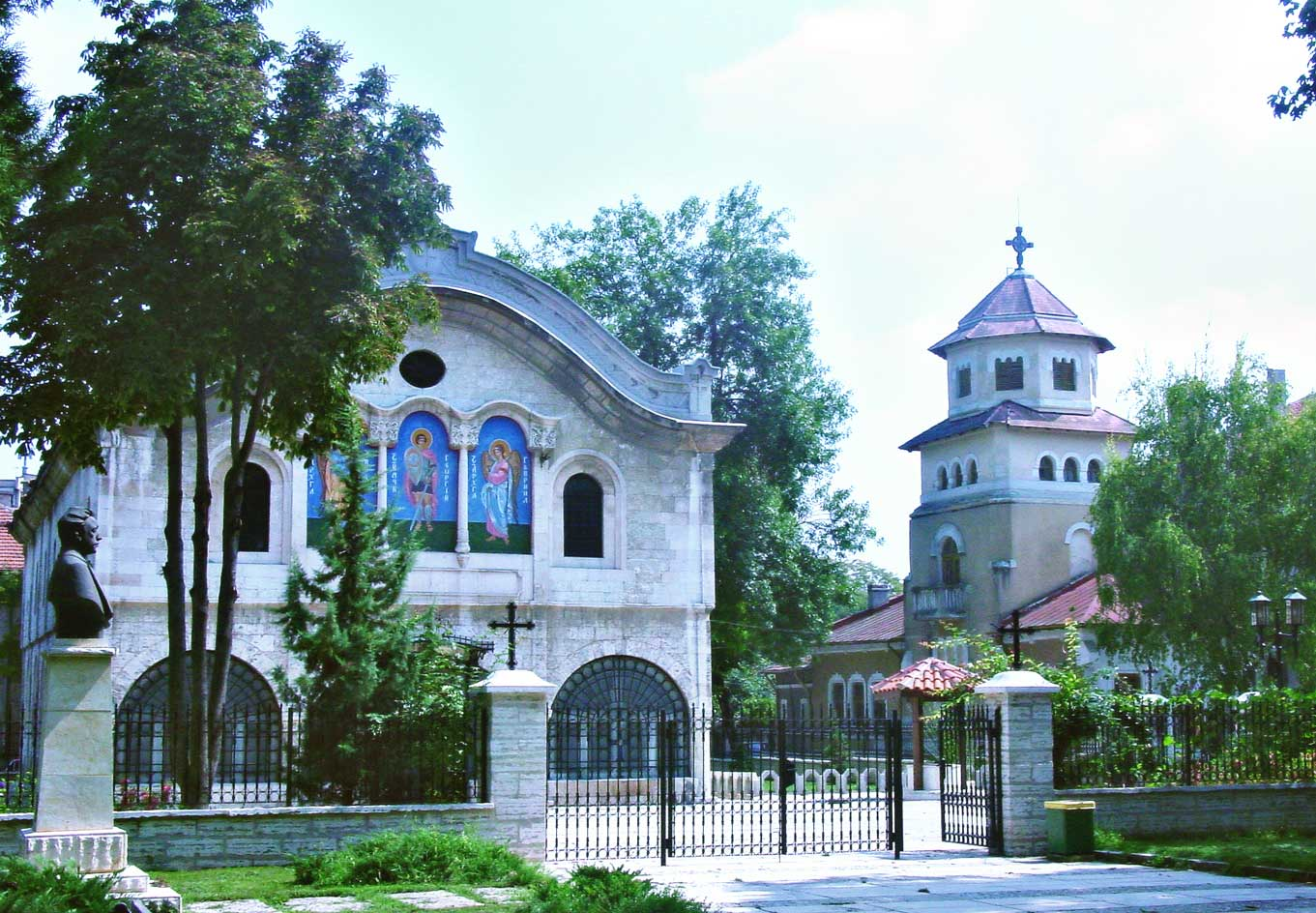
The Church of St George in the centre of Dobrich, to the left is the statue of Vasil Levski by Kolyo Bogdanov

The church is the oldest church from the Revival period in Dobrich. It is located in the center of the town, in the immediate vicinity of the Ethnographic house. The building is a cultural heritage site. It was built in 1864, on the spot of an older Christian church from 1843 that burned down during the Crimean War, together with the lower Bulgarian neighborhood.

In an architectural sense, the new church is a three-nave basilica. It was built with the donations of the Bulgarian population in Dobrich and the Dobrich district, in the courtyard of the great Bulgarian Revival figure Ivan Hadzhi Valkov. It is assumed that the church was made by unknown craftsmen who belonged or at least were familiar with the school of the famous Bulgarian master Kolyu Ficheto. The frescoes inside are made by Kozma Blazhenov, a representative of the Debar Art School, who also made the engraved iconostasis. The icons were painted by painters famous at the time – Nedko Todorovic from Zheravna, Haralambi Todorov from Pirdop and Nikolay Vasilev from Shumen. The church was consecrated in 1889 by Bishop Simeon.

==== “Holy Trinity” Church ====
The “Holy Trinity” church is located in the center of Dobrich. The older church building that was situated at this place was built in 1859, to the left of the entrance of today’s church. It was later joined by the first school in the town, where the mutual instruction approach was used. The present church was built in 1911. Architecturally speaking, it is a classic three-nave basilica, a dome and a bell tower. The icons of its iconostasis were painted by Gospodin Zhelyazkov, a student of Repin.

==== Armenian Church “Saint Hovhaness” ====
It was built in 1894, replacing an old temple from 1830. It was designed by Italian architects. It is a one-nave church with stone foundations and walls and a wooden roof. In the temple you can see original images of Armenian saints painted in the 19th century.

=== Towns and villages ===
The Municipality of Dobrich has a special status - the territory of the municipality holds only the town of Dobrich with a population of 91030 people. Transport system The road and communication network provides access to all parts of the region and to other regions in Bulgaria. Rail provides convenient and cheap travel to the capital city, the Black Sea coast, and to some European countries. Street network The street network has been expanded according to the detailed urban development plans and the particulars of the terrain. A ring road regulates the direct and the outgoing traffic to Varna, Albena, Balchik, General Toshevo, Silistra, Shumen and Russe. The street network of the town (total length 165 km, of which 60 km main streets) takes the incoming and the internal traffic.

== Culture ==
Name	Description	Photo
Ethnographic House	The Ethnographic House was built in 1860 by a rich trader of wheat. It represents a typical for the renaissance age architectural monument. A century later the house was restored and turned into a museum representing the life and livelihood of the population of Dobrudzha of the end of 19th and the beginning of the 20th century. Visitors of the museum have the opportunity to meet and see the traditional clothing of the local people, the house (kitchen), the bedroom and the basement where exhibited are original dishes for preparing and preservation of conserved food and agricultural tools and items related to the household work. On the upper floor, in the guestroom recreated is the atmosphere of the home of a rich trader, emigrated from Kotel. In the rest of the rooms restored are the previous looks of the house, the closet as well as the cozy porch.	
Architectural – Ethnographic Complex "The Old Dobrich"	Established in the city center of the contemporary town, on the place of the Odun Charshiya, the ethnographic museum “The Old Dobrich” preserves and represents the traditional Dobrudzha crafts from the end of the 19th and the first half of the 20th century. In the renovated old city charshiya craftsmen continue a tradition from many centuries. Using old hand technologies and with original instruments, in more than 30 workshops created are traditional items of pottery, blacksmith, embroidery, weaving, cooperage, homespun, goldsmith and others. In the center of the complex restored is the old clock tower built in the 18th century – a symbol of the Bulgarian renaissance spirit of the town.	
House Memorial “Yordan Yovkov”	In 1980 to the house-museum is built a house memorial where settled is the one of its kind in Bulgaria permanent museum exposition “Yordan Yovkov – life and creative path” and located is the richest fund of the writer. Of interest are the cabinet of Yovkov and the remarkable mural of Stoimen Stoilov “In the world of Yovkov’s characters”.The new exhibition “Dora Gabe” is a lyrical continuation of the exposition “Yordan Yovkov – life and creative path”, an unforgettable moment of eternity. During the years the house-museum with house memorial “Yordan Yovkov” confirmed itself as a center of the view of Yovkov, recognized not only among Bulgarians but among international scientific community as well.	
The House of Yordan Yovkov and Yordan Yovkov Museum	They commemorate the classic of Bulgarian literature, the great writer and humanist, the master of the short story genre - Yordan Yovkov. Some of his works have been translated in 40 languages and included in anthologies of world literature. The museum houses a remarkable piece of art - the ceramic collection The World of Yovkov's Personages by artist Stoimen Stoilov.On the 30th anniversary of the Union of Bulgarian Architects, the building of the museum was awarded the highest architectural design prize Archscar (architects A. Stoyanov, P. Ganchev, A. Koev, G. Mihaylov).	
Museum of Military Cemetery	In the town of Dobrich located is the largest military cemetery in Bulgaria of the time of the World War I. The cemetery is a unique monument of culture related to the fights of the town in 1916. In it, buried are over 3000 soldiers of four religions and seven nationalities – Bulgarians, Russians, Romanians, Germans, Turkish, Serbians and Jews. In 1922 the people of Dobrudzha, with their own money build an ossuary chapel St. Archangel Michael, iconography by the Dobrich painter Nikola Tahtunov.In the museum you may view the exposition “Dobrich Epic 1916”.	
New and newest history	The museum of new and newest history is located in the building of the old casino in the town of Dobrich. It collects evidence of the history of Dobrudzha of 1878 up to today. In its funds preserved are over 100 000 museum valuables. Interesting are the collection of the Old Dobrich, the Dobrudzha Question (1878 – 1940), the Dobrich epic 1916, the City Park St. George, Weapon of New Time, Political Parties Today. The exposition of the museum represents the faith of Dobrudzha during the Romanian domination, the peaceful retrieving of the south part to Bulgaria in 1940 as well as many other valuable museum collections.	
Art Gallery - Dobrich	The Art Gallery of Dobrich is in the city center. It is a unique statute of culture, one of the 100th national touristic sights of Bulgaria. It was built in the beginning of the 20th century for a judicial-administrative purposes, it takes a key place in the city life. Along the decades it has housed different institutions. In 1981 the building becomes a gallery. In it you may see a permanent exposition of masterpieces of Bulgarian art – paintings, sculptures and graphics of the beginning of the 20th century to the 1990s – paintings of the most famous Bulgarian painters as Zlatyu Boyadzhiev, Vladimir Dimitrov – Maystora, Dechko Uzunov, Bencho Obreshkov and many others, part of the national golden fund of Bulgaria as well as graphics of the most famous contemporary artists.	

== Places of interest ==
=== The City Park St. George ===
The City Park St. George or the city garden as known among people of Dobrich is the most visited place in Dobrich by its citizens and guests. In the far year of 1867 Bildieto (the City Municipal Council) selects a place in the neighborhood of Karabokluka for establishment of the first city garden. An enormous contribution for development of the city-park art has the family of Gradinarovi. Its area is 430 dca and is divided into several sectors – “The Old Garden”, Children’s sector – a zone for games and fun, park lakes zone, zone of rock terrace gardens, sports zone etc. In 1999 the old garden of the city park is announced to be a monument of culture and garden park art. The park is located immediately next to the central pedestrian zone in Dobrich. The park is one of the five oldest city parks in the country. It covers – the old garden, declared to be a cultural heritage site, a children's area, lakes, terraced rock gardens and a sports area. Even today the visitors can see some plant species imported from Europe at the beginning of the last century. The park hosts also one on the town museums, with a separate room for temporary and visiting exhibitions.

=== Nature and Animal Protection Centre ===
The centre is the only one of its kind not only in Bulgaria but also in Eastern Europe. Founded under a Bulgarian-Swiss project, it boasts an area of 16 hectares, 50-year-old vegetation (trees and bushes), and a convenient access. The zoo houses over 40 animal species - deer, roe, raccoon, alpaca, llamas, mouflons, goats, Przhevalski's horses, brown bears, bison, pheasants, storks, pelicans exotic and water birds, turtles, etc. - which live in conditions very close to their natural habitats. A priority for the zoo is the reproduction and re-introduction of endangered animal species.

=== Dobrich TV Tower ===
Dobrich TV Tower houses broadcasting equipment for radio, television and telecommunications. It is 146 metres tall and built of reinforced concrete. The tower, which was designed by Petar Andreev, was completed in 1979 and has an observation deck that is no longer open to visitors. It is also remarkable by its design.

== Social institutions ==
=== Education ===
The activities of the Department of "Education and Culture" in secondary education are conducted in accordance with the requirements of the Education Act, the regulations implementing the Education Act and are consistent with the educational policy of Dobrich Municipality. Educational policy in general considers socio-economic characteristics of modern society as well as prospects for future development. In this sense today it is important to reconsider the capacity of Bulgarian schools to respond to the new challenges adequately.

The existing school network in the city sufficiently meets the interests of young people as well as the needs of economy. At this stage the territorial model meets the need of accessibility. There is a secondary school in each sub region of the city, which is near the students' place of residence. This allows free and compulsory education for all. The manager's office, "Humanitarian Activities" - Section "Education and Culture" Dobrich, is the specialized authority for management of municipal kindergartens and schools. It is located at: Dobrich, st. "Nezvisimost" 7 Neicho Neychev - Head of "Education and Culture"

At the beginning of 2013/2014, the education network in the city of Dobrich includes 17 kindergartens, 7 elementary schools, 5 middle schools, 3 specialized schools, 7 vocational schools, a sport school, a subsidiary school, 2 private schools, student dormitories, a dormitory and Municipal Youth Center "Zahari Stoyanov".

The number of pupils in primary schools is 2362 and the number of classes 107.

In 5 secondary schools, a sports schools and 3 specialized high schools ar trained 6090 students in 265 classes. Profile subjects in the schools: Humanities, Sciences, Foreign Language and Technology. Profile subjects such as Music, Art and Sport are also available to choose.

From the approved state plan for the admission of pupils on completion of seventh grade in local schools, including 16 classes were implemented 16. After completing basic education are formed 5 classes.

In market conditions vocational education in municipality is held in 7 vocational schools located in different areas of the city. During the school year 2013/2014 1598 students are trained in 26 majors and professions in 73 classes. Each professional school has its own building and facilities for practical training. Private schools in the territory of Dobrich are 2 with a total of 95 students in 16 classes.

- Distance Learning Centre of Technical University - Varna

Programmes: Management, Industrial management, Business administration.

- University of Shumen ‘Ep. K. Preslavski'- College in Dobrich

Programmes: Pre-school pedagogics and foreign languages, Primary school pedagogics and foreign languages, Design and technology, Art, Information technology, Library operations, Farming (specialization in agricultural economics and rural tourism), Public administration, Public Relations, Tourism.

- Dobrich University of Management

Programmes: Marketing and management of the hospitality industry, Marketing and management, Agricultural economics, Hotel management, International business and management.

There are about 30 high schools, 19 kindergartens and 3 mangers in Dobrich.

== Sport ==
- FC Dobrudzha 1919
- Volleyball Club Dobrudzha 07
- Handball Club Dobrudzha
- Boxing Club Dobrotitsa
- Wrestling Club

== Notable people from Dobrich ==
- Ahmed III, Ottoman Sultan during the Tulip period, who was born in Dobrich at the year 1673.
- Dora Gabe, poet
- Dimitar Spisarevski, fighter pilot
- Adriana Budevska, actress
- Boncho Genchev, football player, 4th in the 1994 FIFA World Cup with the Bulgarian national team
- Boris Nikolov, boxer, the first Bulgarian ever to win a medal at the Olympics
- Preslava, pop-folk singer
- Miro, singer, under the real name of Miroslav Kostadinov
- Nikolay Kostov, football manager and former footballer
- Kadriye Nurmambet, tatar folk singer, lawyer

== Twin towns and sister cities ==
Dobrich is twinned with:

- Białystok, Poland
- Golmud, China
- Izmail, Ukraine
- Kavadarci, North Macedonia
- Kırklareli, Turkey
- Pinsk, Belarus
- Saratov, Russia
- Schaffhausen, Switzerland
- Zalaegerszeg, Hungary

== Gallery ==
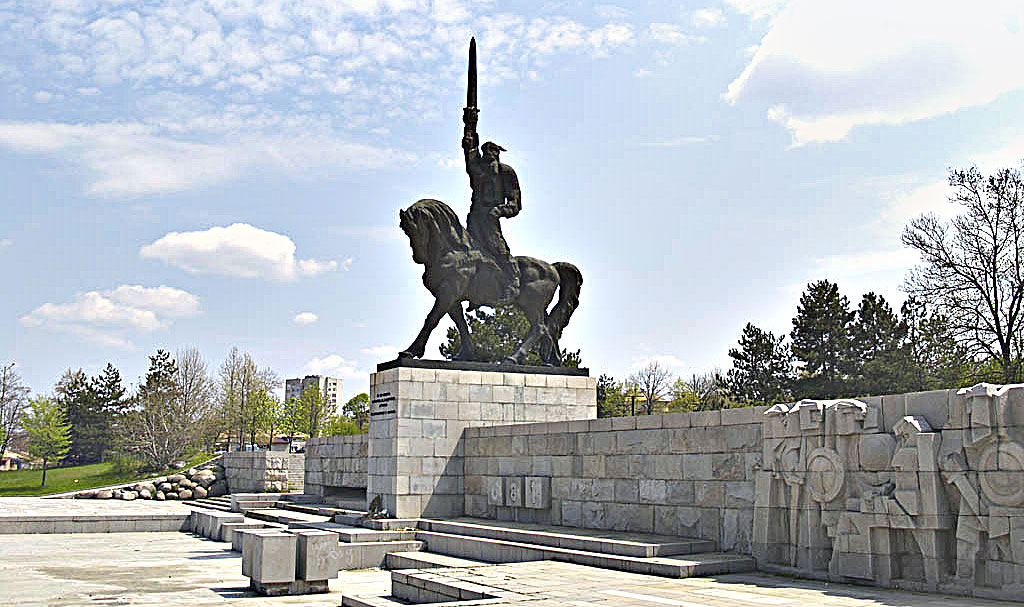
Khan Asparuh (reign 668–695) monument, credited for establishment of the First Bulgarian Empire in 681

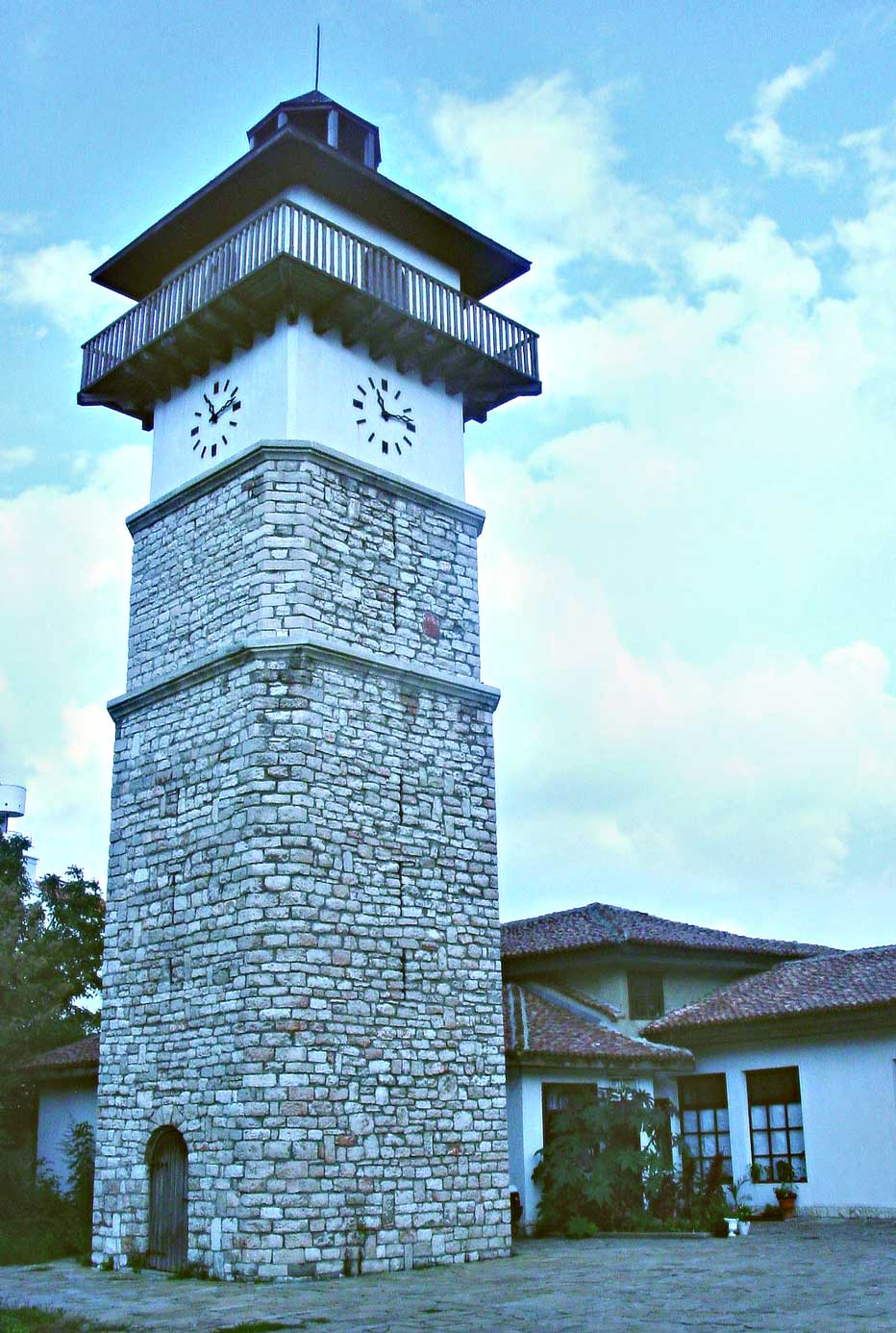
The clock tower in the "Old Dobrich"

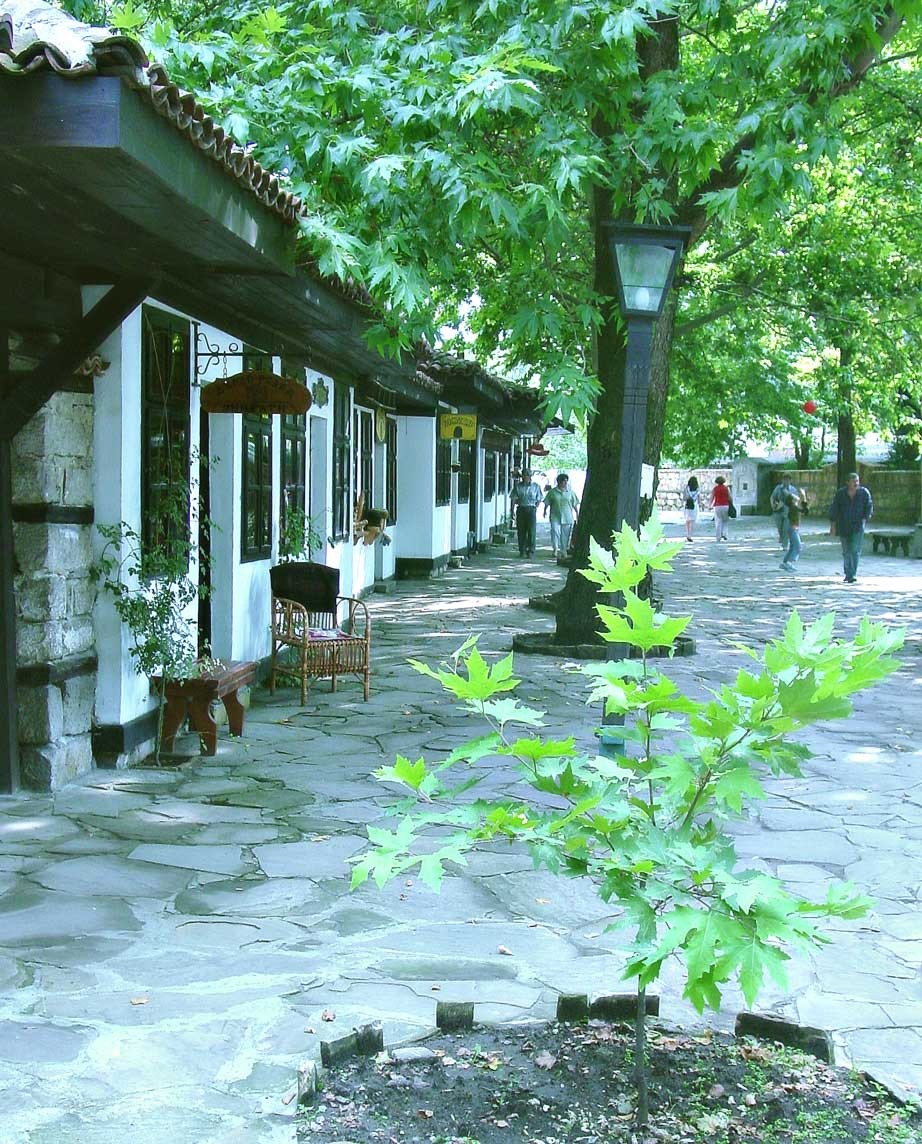
A street in the "Old Dobrich"

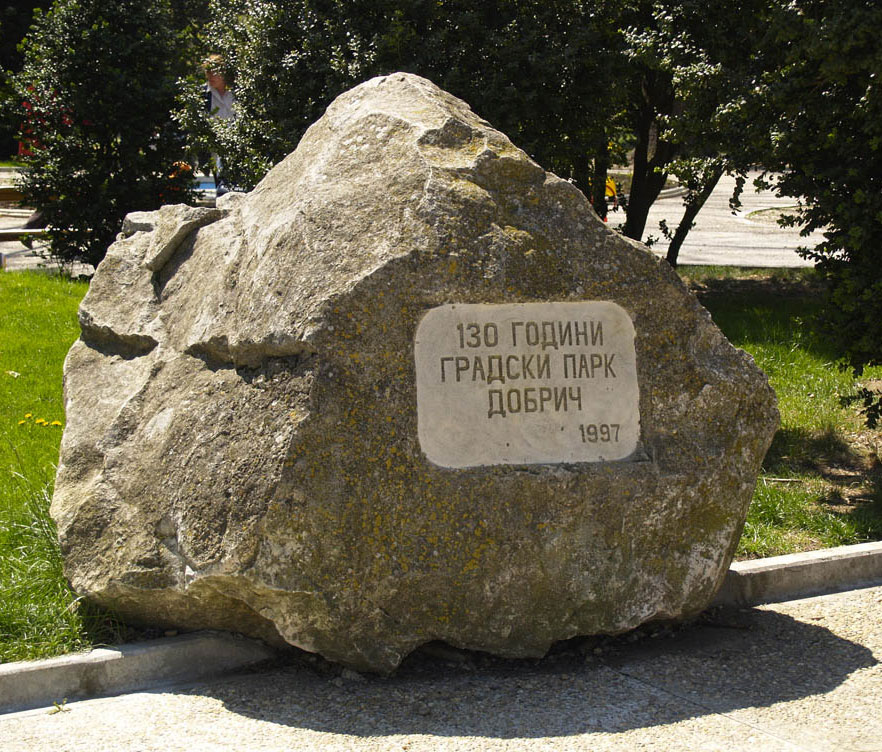
130 years city park Dobrich 1997

The park in Dobrich (TV tower at the distance on the right)

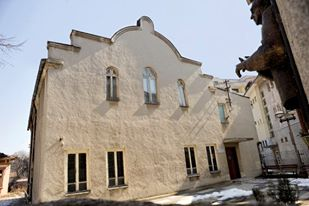
The Synagogue in Dobrich

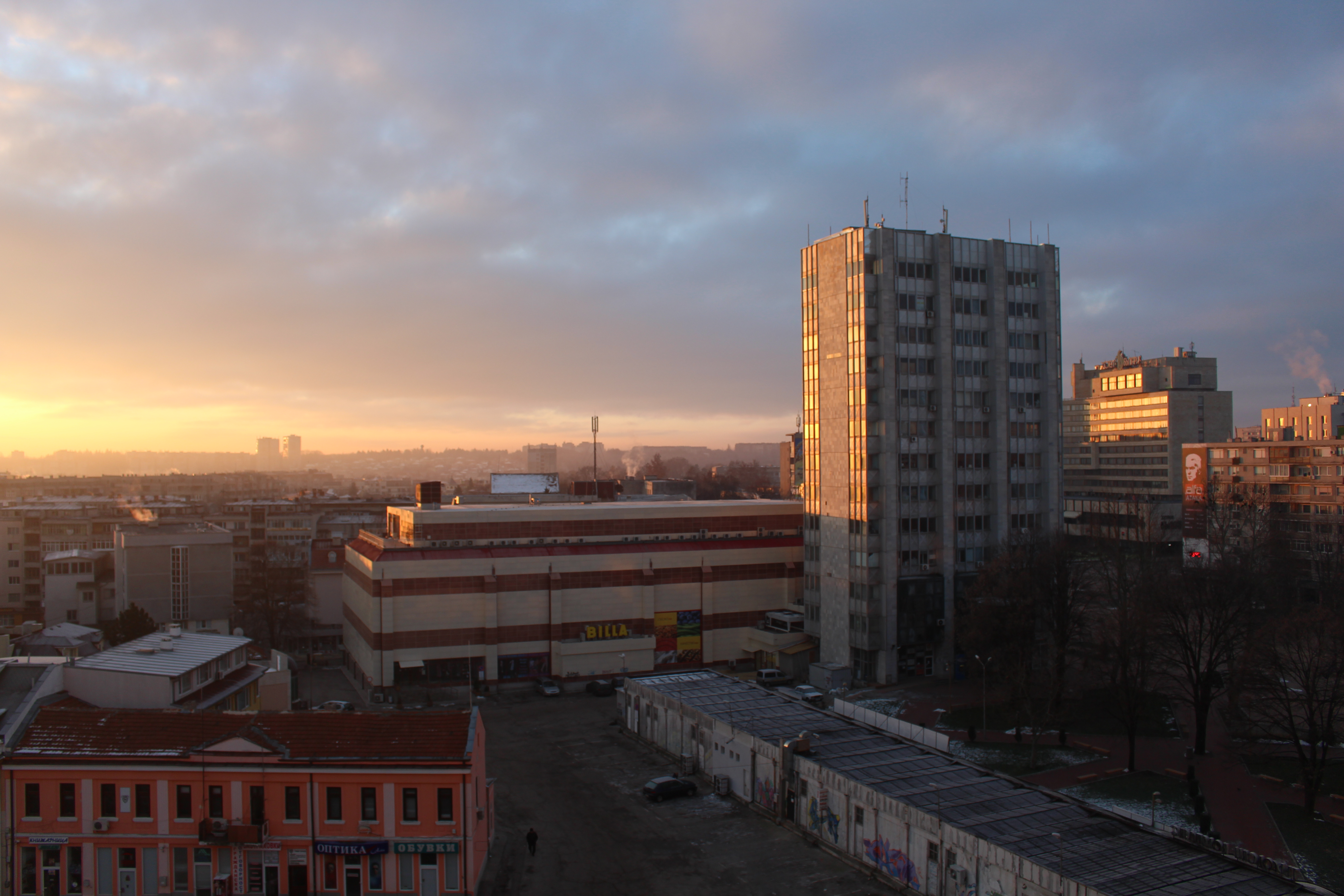
View of sunrise in Dobrich from apartment building.

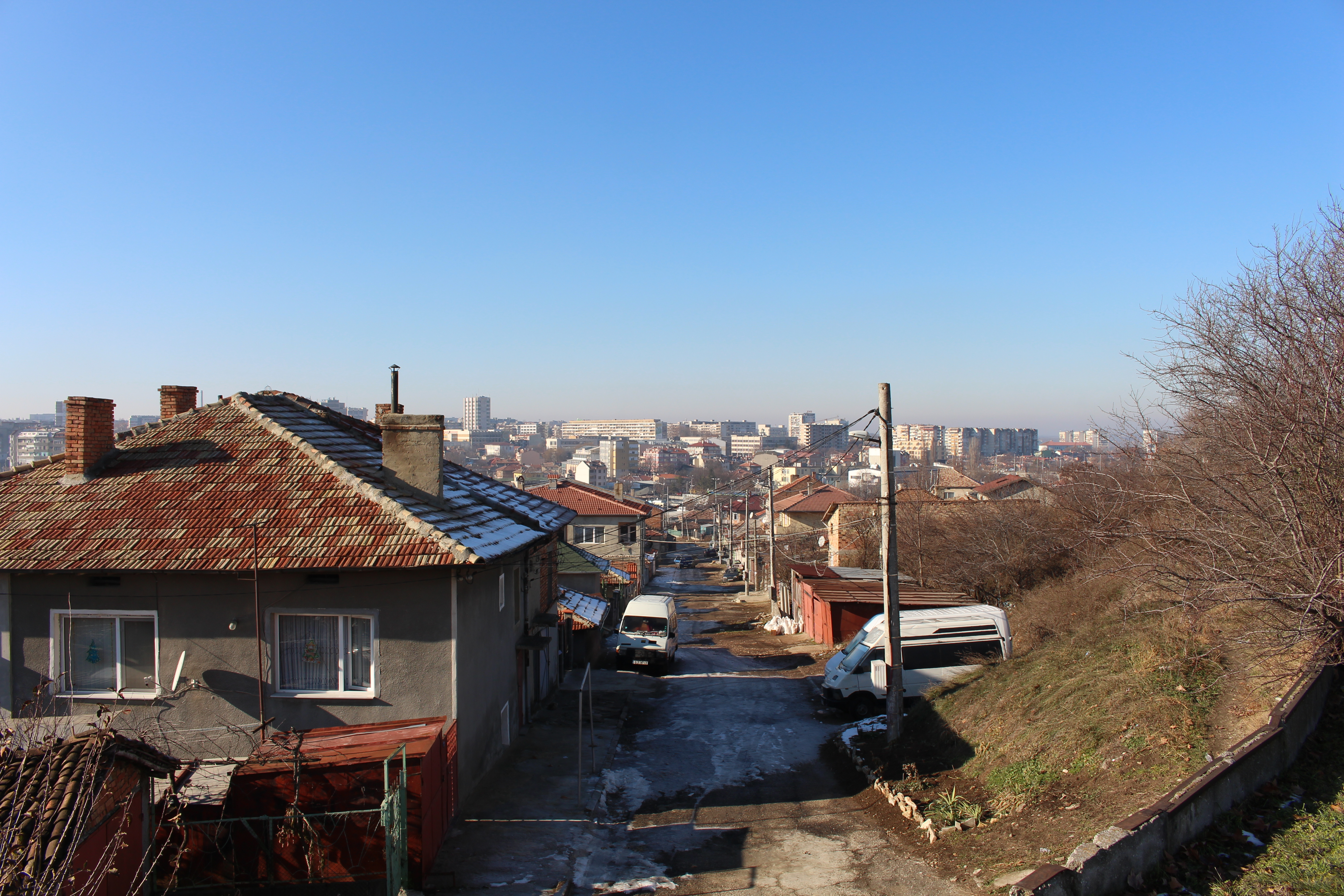
Dobrich, Bulgaria, view from Hristo Botev area toward city center.

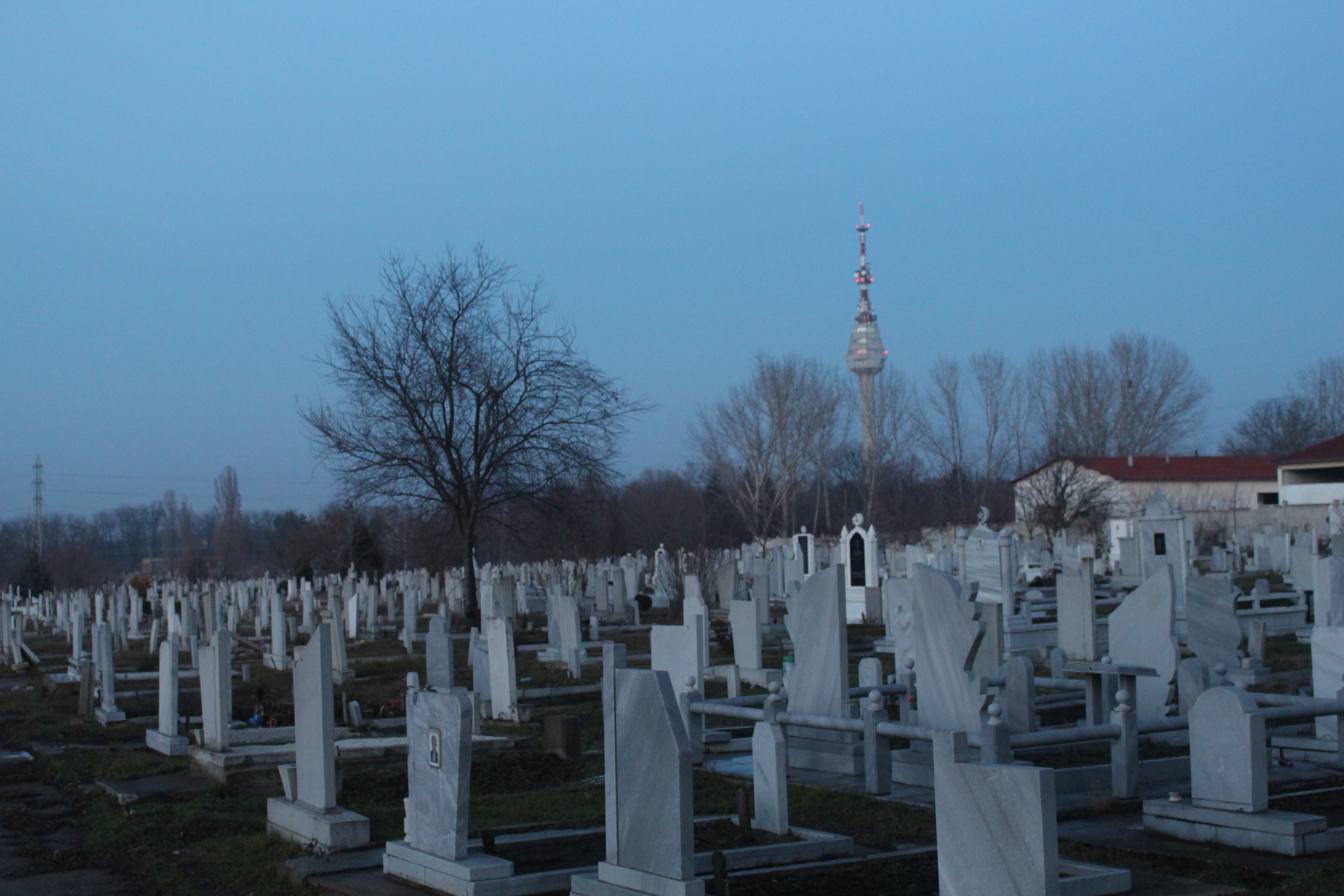
View from city cemetery in Dobrich, looking toward Dobrich TV tower.
