= Snezhanka Tower =

Television tower in Bulgaria

- кула Снежанка
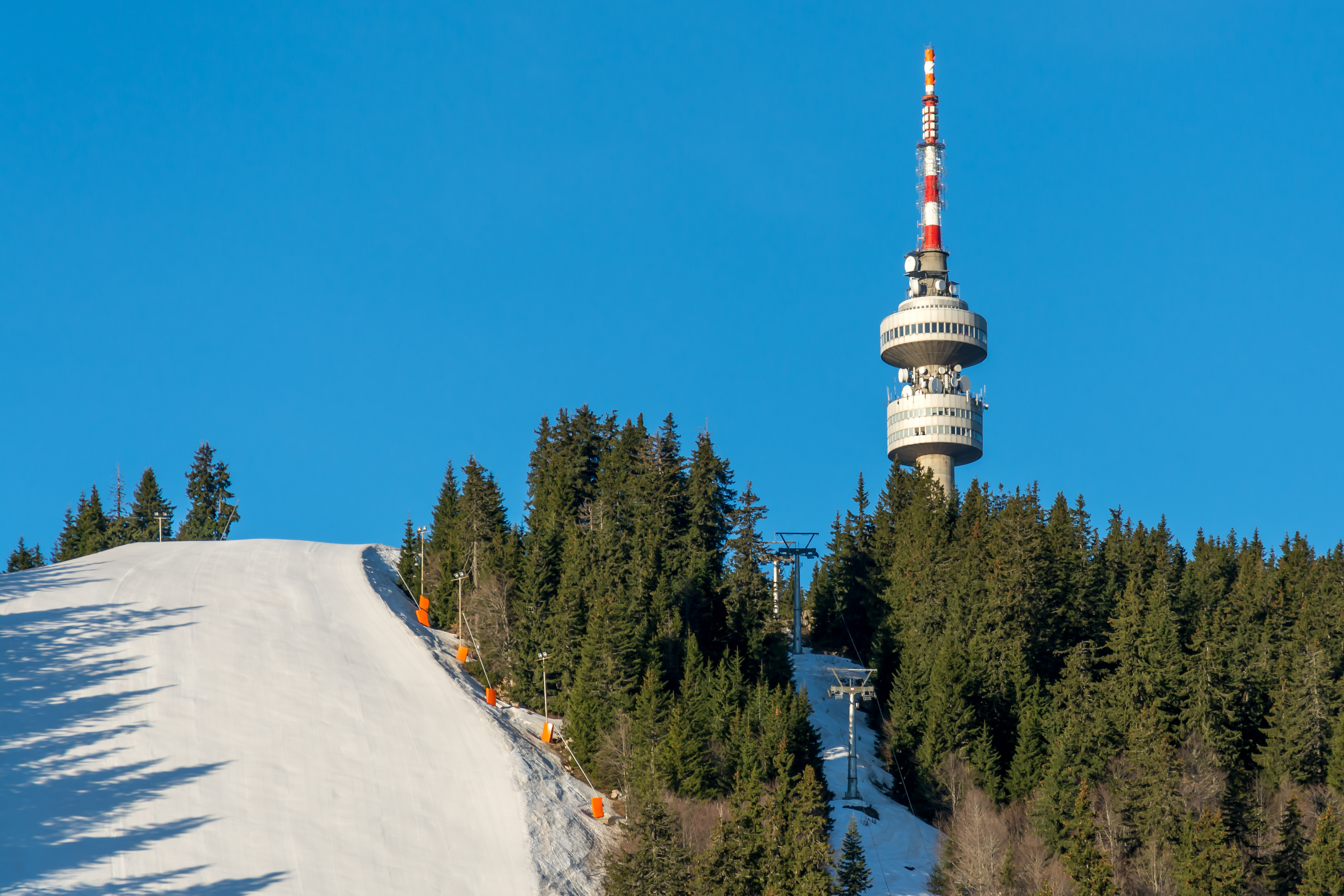
- The Snezhanka Tower

- Location within Bulgaria
- Interactive map of the Snezhanka Tower area

General information
- Status: Completed
- Type: Television tower, Radio tower, Restaurant, Observation tower
- Location: Snezhanka peak, Rhodopes
- Coordinates: 41°38′14″N 24°40′44″E
- Elevation: 1926 meters
- Construction started: 1973
- Completed: 1978; 48 years ago

Height
- Height: 156 m (511.81 ft)

Design and construction
- Architects: Metodi Zarkov, Flora Atkova, Boris Krastev
- Main contractor: People's Republic of Bulgaria

Snezhanka Tower (кула „Снежанка“) is a 156-metre-high television tower built of reinforced concrete with an observation deck near Pamporovo, Bulgaria. Snezhanka Tower is situated on Snezhanka Peak, at 1,926 metres (6,319 ft) above sea level.

The tower has a café with a panoramic view of the Rhodope, the Rila and the Pirin Mountains, even the Aegean Sea being visible on a clear day.

== History ==
Before the Snezhanka Tower, from 1971, the site was already being used by the Bulgarian National Television and Radio to transmit their respective broadcasts.

In 1973, construction on the Snezhanka Tower began, with the goal of replacing the older and much smaller broadcasting equipment in place at the time.

The tower was completed and opened to the public in 1978.

== Design ==
The building, even when planned, was intended to be a tourist destination. This goal was reflected in the design for the building, with the bigger, lower ring of the tower housing television and radio broadcasting equipment, and the thinner, top ring being a panoramic cafe and restaurant.

== See also ==
- List of towers
- List of tallest structures in Bulgaria
