= Vitosha Mountain TV Tower =

Television tower near Sofia, Bulgaria

Coordinates: 42°38′13″N 23°14′38″E

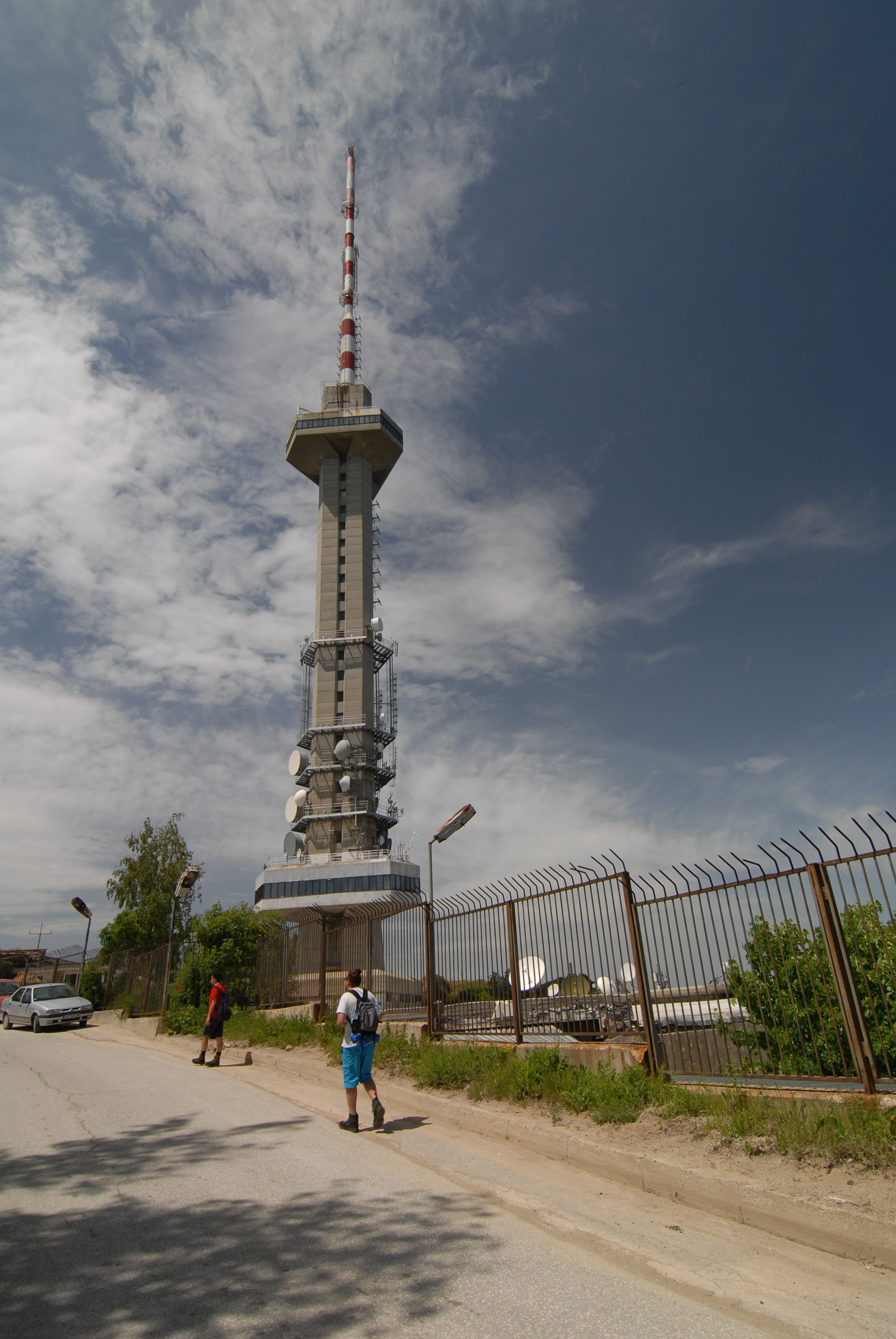
People passing by the Kopitoto TV transmission tower

Vitosha Mountain TV Tower, better known as Kopitoto (Bulgarian: Копитото, "The Hoof") after the rock outcrop (1,348 m or 4,423 ft) it stands on, is a 186-metre (610 ft) tall TV tower built of reinforced concrete on Vitosha Mountain near Sofia, Bulgaria. The footprint of the tower has the shape of a hexagon with three of the sides extended (i.e. almost triangular). From the tower there is a commanding view of Sofia, and the tower can be seen from everywhere in Sofia, making it a landmark of Sofia's skyline. It is the second tallest television tower in Bulgaria.

== See also ==
- List of towers
- List of tallest structures in Bulgaria
