= Stara Zagora Transmitter =

Broadcasting station in Bulgaria

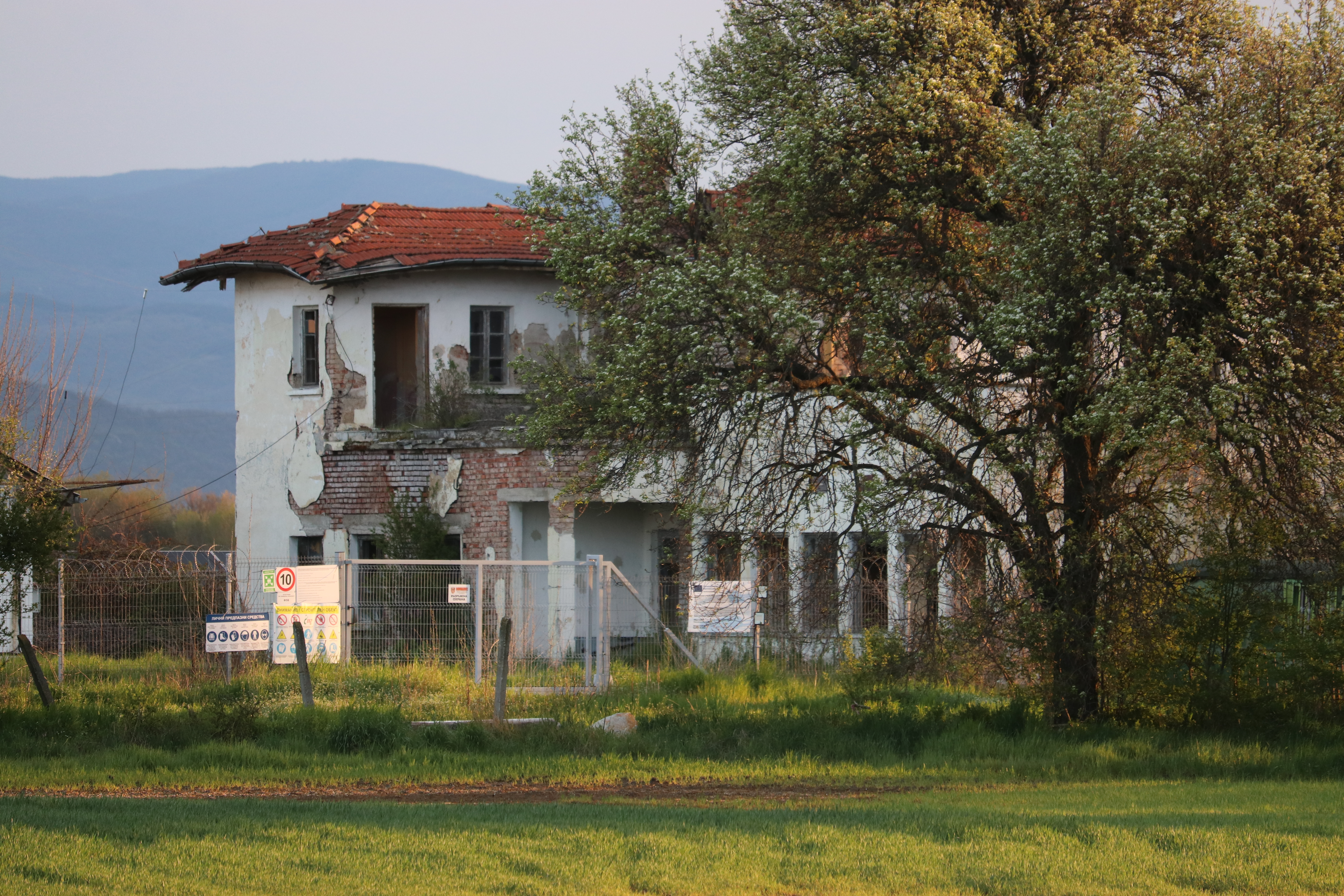
- One of the initial buildings on the site, from the 1930s
- Location: Bulgaria, Stara Zagora Municipality
- Coordinates: 42°23′25″N 25°42′6″E
- Commissioned: February 10, 1936
- Decommissioned: April 7, 2013
- Demolished: January 17, 2015
- Owner: Bulgarian National Radio

The Stara Zagora Transmitter was a high power mediumwave broadcasting station near Stara Zagora in Bulgaria.

It had at least 3 guyed masts. One of these masts was a Blaw-Knox Tower. It was one of the few Blaw-Knox towers in Europe, along with similar masts at Vakarel, Bulgaria, at Riga, Latvia, Lakihegy, Hungary and Lisnagarvey, Northern Ireland.

The transmitter was established on February 10, 1936, broadcasting BNR's Radio Stara Zagora. The transmitter at the time had a power of 2 kW and an antenna height of 60 meters.

In 1954, the station was upgraded with a Czechoslovak 20 kW Tesla SRV-20 transmitter. In 1975 a second antenna was erected along with the 500 kW "Stara Zagora-I" transmitter, for the purposes of broadcasting the "Horizont" program. During the communist regime in Bulgaria, the site had shortwave antennas for radio frequency jamming.

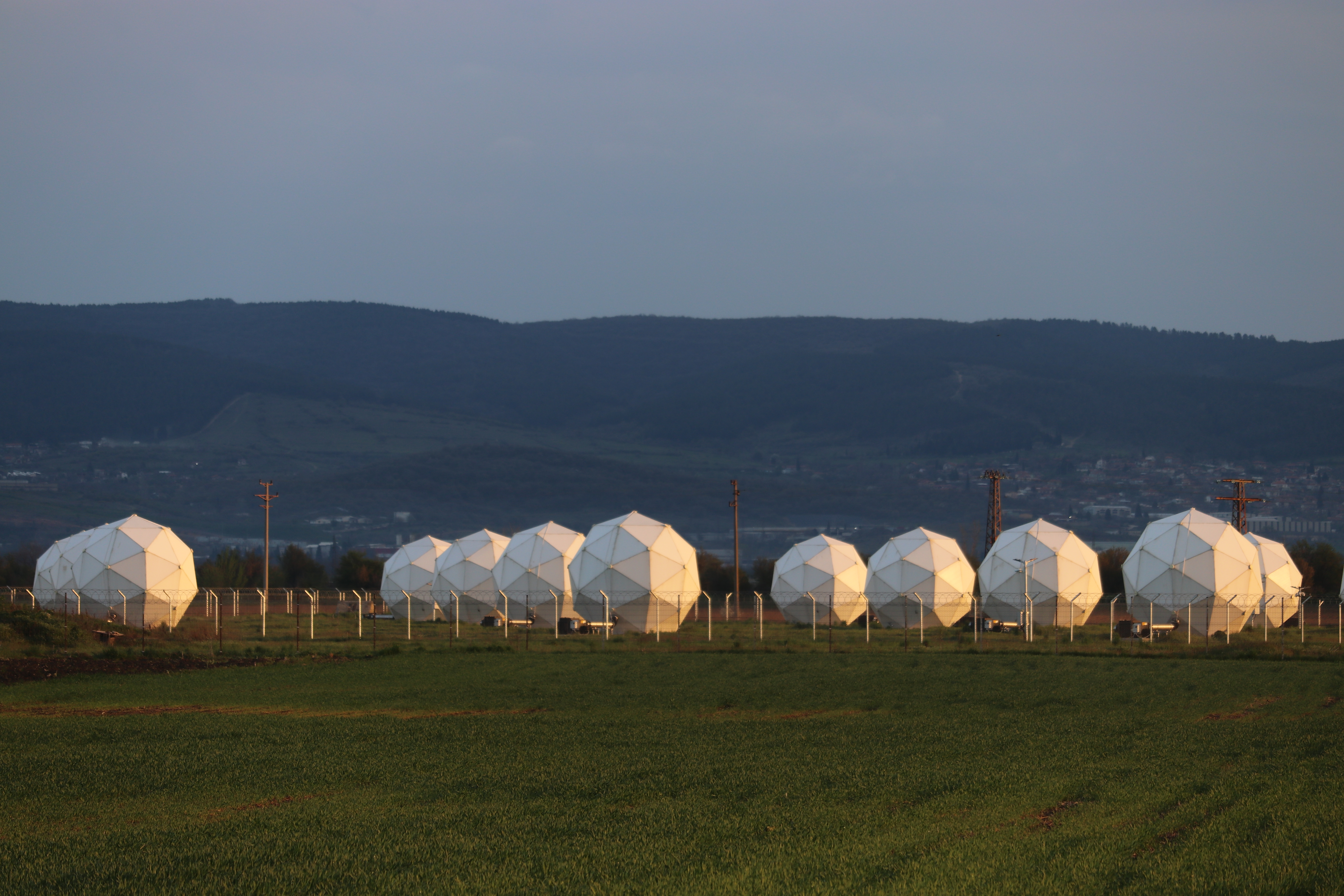
Radomes, installed by Vivacom on the site in 2023

On April 6, 2010, in an effort to save money, BNR disabled a large portion of their medium wave transmitters, including the Stara Zagora transmitters. However, later that year, from the 31st of July, up until April 7, 2013, the station was re-enabled and transmitted onto 873 kHz.

The transmitter was shut down on April 7, 2013. The masts were dismantled and scrapped in November 2014.

In 2023, a ground station for satellite communications was opened on the territory of the former radio transmitting station, a joint project of Vivacom and Eutelsat Group.

== See also ==
- List of tallest structures in Bulgaria
