= Venets Transmitter =

Coordinates: 43°31′N 26°50′E

Venets Transmitter (Bulgarian: РРТС Венец) is a facility for FM and TV-broadcasting near Venets and Samuil in Shumen Province, Bulgaria. Venets Transmitter uses as antenna tower a 302-metre-tall (991 ft) guyed lattice steel mast with rectangular cross section. This mast, which was built in 1975, is the tallest radio mast in Bulgaria. The TV transmitter, which used it as antenna, was the most powerful TV transmitter in Bulgaria with 50 kW. It broadcast the program of BNT 1 on channel 5 and could be received in Romania, Moldova and Ukraine.

In 2008, due to interference with foreign FM radio stations, the transmitter was shut down and broadcasting of BNT 1 was switched to channel 56 on a new NEC transmitter. The analogue transmitters were shut down on September 30, 2015, when simulcast period ended and Bulgaria switched to DVB-T.

Beside this, Venets is used for FM-broadcasting with three 10 kW NEC transmitters. Until 2007 the transmitter broadcast the Turkish language program of the Bulgarian National Radio in the OIRT-band on frequency 69,80 MHz.

The current transmission frequencies are:

Radio programme	FM frequency	ERP	Remarks
BNR Radio Shumen	87,6 MHz	10 kW	1975-2004: 69.80 MHz, 3 kW
BNR Hristo Botev	100,4 MHz	10 kW	1975-1994: 72.56 MHz, 3 kW
BNR Horizont	102 MHz	10 kW	1975-1994: 71.00 MHz, 3 kW

TV programme	UHF Channel	ERP	Remarks
Multiplex 2	40	5 kW	BNT 1; BNT 2; BNT HD; bTV; Nova TV; Bulgaria On Air
