= Euroclassic Notturno =

European overnight classical music programme

- Other names: Through the Night; Euroradio Notturno
- Genre: Classical music
- Running time: 360 minutes
- Country of origin: United Kingdom (as Through the Night)
- Language: Various
- Home station: BBC Radio 3 (1996–present); Euroradio (1998–present)
- Syndicates: EBU members via Euroradio network (see Broadcasters)
- Hosted by: Various (UK: Catriona Young, John Shea, Jonathan Swain, Danielle Jalowiecka, Penny Gore)
- Created by: BBC Radio, EBU
- Produced by: Ellie Mant; Brian Jackson; Bill Nicholls; Jenny Pitt; Deirdre O'Donovan
- Original release: 5 May 1996 (Note: First aired as Through the Night) – present
- Audio format: Stereo
- Opening theme: "Madrigal Nocturne" – La cheminée du roi René (Sweden and UK)
- Website: Official website; BBC Radio 3

Euroclassic Notturno is a six-hour radio sequence of classical music recordings assembled by BBC Radio from material supplied by members of the European Broadcasting Union (EBU) and distributed, via the EBU's Euroradio network, to a number of these broadcasters for use in their overnight classical music schedules. The recordings used are not taken from commercially available CDs but come instead from earlier (usually live) radio broadcasts.

Supplied by the BBC on a commercial basis, the service claims to provide broadcasters with a less expensive alternative to local origination of overnight classical-music programming.

== Format ==
The sequence is put together by a small BBC team in London and Salford, and gaps are provided in the schedule to allow for local origination of explanatory material in each broadcaster's national language (written programme notes in English are supplied by the BBC some weeks in advance), top-of-the-hour news summaries, etc. In the United Kingdom, the sequence is broadcast on BBC Radio 3 without news.

== Broadcast ==
The service is streamed from Broadcasting House in London between 00:00 and 06:00 Central European Time seven days a week, though actual transmission times may be shifted locally – the BBC itself, for instance, broadcasts its own version (which goes out under the title Through the Night) between 00:30 and 06:30 (UK time).

BBC Radio 3's Through the Night was first broadcast on 5 May 1996 when 24-hour broadcasting was introduced on the station. The first presenter was Donald Macleod.

As transmission is unattended the playout servers are duplicated to provide resilience, although the service has, in fact, run reliably since 1998.

=== Broadcasters ===
EBU member broadcasting organisations currently taking the service include (all indicated times are local):

Country	Station	Broadcaster	Local title	Time
Austria	Ö1	ORF	Ö1 Nachtmusik (Ö1 Night Music)	1.00–6.00 (Mon–Sat)
Bulgaria	Hristo Botev Radio	BNR	Еврокласик ноктюрно (Evroklasik noktyurno)	3.00–5.00
Croatia	HRT 3	HRT	Euroclassic Notturno	0.00–6.00
Greece	Third Programme	ERT	Trito	1.00–7.00
Hungary	Bartók Rádió	MR	Notturno	0.00–6.00
Poland	Dwójka	PR	Muzyczna Noc Euroradia (Euroradio’s Music Night)	2.00–6.00 (Mon–Fri)
Romania	Radio România Muzical	SRR	Notturno	1.00–7.00
Slovakia	Rádio Devín	RTVS	Euroclassic Nocturno	2.00–6.00
Slovenia	ARS	RTV	Evropski klasični nokturno	0.00–4.00
Sweden	Sveriges Radio P2	SR	Notturno	0.00–6.00
Turkey	Radyo 3	TRT	Notturno	1.00–7.00
United Kingdom	BBC Radio 3	BBC (originator)	Through the Night	0.30–6.30 (Note: Prior to September 2024, it was broadcast 0:30 and 6:30 on Mondays to Fridays, and from 1:00 till 7:00 on Saturdays and Sundays)

EBU members that previously carried the service include:

Country	Station	Broadcaster	Local title	Time
Czech Republic	ČRo Vltava (2004)	ČRo	Euroclassic Notturno	
Denmark	DR P2	DR	Klassisk Natradio	
Iceland	Rás 1	RÚV	Næturtónar	
Ireland	RTÉ lyric fm (1998 – early 2000s)	RTÉ	Euroclassic Notturno	0.00–6.00
Italy	Rai Radio Classica (2014–2017)	RAI	Euroclassic Notturno	0.00–2.00
Netherlands	NPO Radio 4 (1998–2007)	NPO	Euroclassic Notturno	1.00–7.00
Norway	NRK P2	NRK	Notturno	0.00–6.00
Ukraine	Radio Culture (2023)	Suspilne	Класична музика вночі на Радіо Культура	2.00–6.00
