= St Augustine's Catholic College =

Location
- Wingfield Road; Trowbridge, Wiltshire, BA14 9EN; England; 51°19′04″N 2°13′13″W

Information
- Type: Academy
- Motto: Together we're stronger
- Religious affiliation: Roman Catholic
- Established: 1967
- Founder: Canon Hudson
- Local authority: Wiltshire Council
- Department for Education URN: 137375 Tables
- Ofsted: Reports
- Chair of Governors: Jo Birkett-Wendes
- Head Teacher: Aidan Dowle
- Staff: ≈100
- Gender: Coeducational
- Age: 11 to 18
- Enrolment: 965 (January 2025)
- Houses: St Peter (purple); Catherine of Sienna (light blue); Josephone Bakhita (red); Maximilian Kolbe (green); Oscar Romero (dark blue); Irma Dulce (orange)
- Colours: Gold and Maroon
- Nickname: St A's
- Publication: School Gazette
- Website: www.st-augustines.wilts.sch.uk

St. Augustine's Catholic College is a Catholic academy secondary school in Trowbridge, Wiltshire, England, with a sixth form for years 12 and 13.

The school opened on its current site in the western suburbs of Trowbridge in 1967. Formerly a voluntary aided school, it became an academy in September 2011.

Following an inspection by Ofsted in November 2021, the school's assessment was 'requires improvement' in all categories. This was its first inspection after converting to an academy; the academy inherited an 'outstanding' rating from its predecessor and was therefore exempt from inspection for some time. The 2021 report stated that pupils "feel safe, attend punctually and behave well in lessons," but noted that "the curriculum is not planned or taught well enough for students to achieve as well as they should."

== Notable people ==
- Danielle Jalowiecka, radio presenter and musician
- Sam Otto, actor
- Danny Talbot, athlete
- Will Thorp, actor
- Joe Andrews, footballer
