= Lakihegy Tower =

Historical radio tower in Hungary

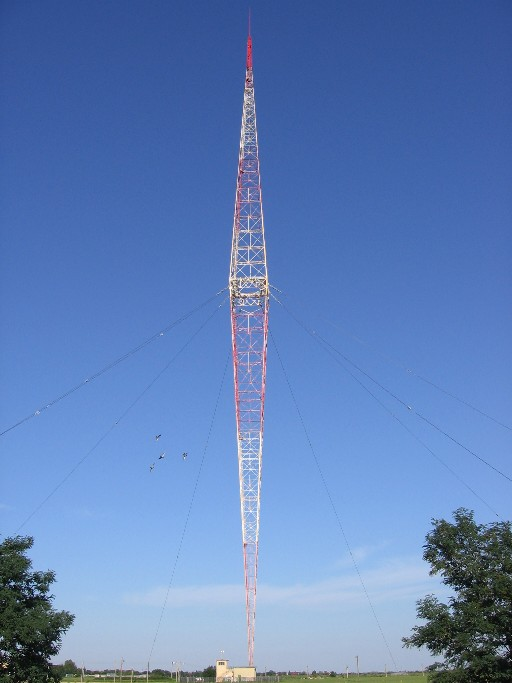
- Lakihegy Tower
- Interactive map of the Lakihegy Tower area

General information
- Type: Blaw-Knox tower
- Location: Szigetszentmiklós, Hungary
- Coordinates: 47°22′23″N 19°00′16″E
- Completed: 1933 (original); 1946 (rebuilt)

Height
- Height: 314 m (1,030.18 ft)

The Lakihegy Tower is a 314-meter-high (1,030-foot) radio mast at Szigetszentmiklós-Lakihegy in Hungary. The Blaw-Knox type tower was built in 1933 and was one of Europe's tallest structures at the time of construction. It was designed to provide broadcast coverage for Hungary with a 120 kW transmitter. It was built for the purpose of transmitting the radio station "Budapest I.", which it served until 1977.

Developed in the U.S., the diamond-shaped mast was specially designed to radiate radio waves in such a way that reduce fading. Thus it was able to serve the whole country.

The mast was destroyed by retreating German troops in World War II, but was later rebuilt in 1946. In 1968 the tower was upgraded to serve the new 300 kW transmitter (amongst others, the ceramic base insulator had to be replaced to withstand the higher voltages).

In 1977 the new 2 MW transmitter at Solt has replaced the Lakihegy Tower as the primary national transmitter. Subsequently, it was nearly torn down in 1981, but widespread objections saved the tower, and later it became a protected industrial monument.

This guyed mast, which is probably still the tallest structure in Hungary, is currently being used for power-distribution control data transmission at 135.6 kHz with a power of 100 kW; the data bursts are at 200 baud with +/- 170 Hz FSK (Frequency Shift Keying).

In Europe there are similar radio masts at Lisnagarvey, Northern Ireland, at Riga, Latvia, at Vakarel, Bulgaria and at Stara Zagora, Bulgaria.

There are two smaller guyed mast radiators for mediumwave at Lakihegy. They are, like the Lakihegy Tower, insulated against ground, but smaller and of conventional construction type.

A further antenna consisting of two free-standing towers is situated at 47°22′25.4″N 18°58′59.74″E. It is fed by a 2.1 km (1.3 mi) overhead radio frequency power line.

The medium wave frequency of 540 kHz with 150 kW was diplexed to the Lakihegy Tower in 2006 by Bernd Waniewski.

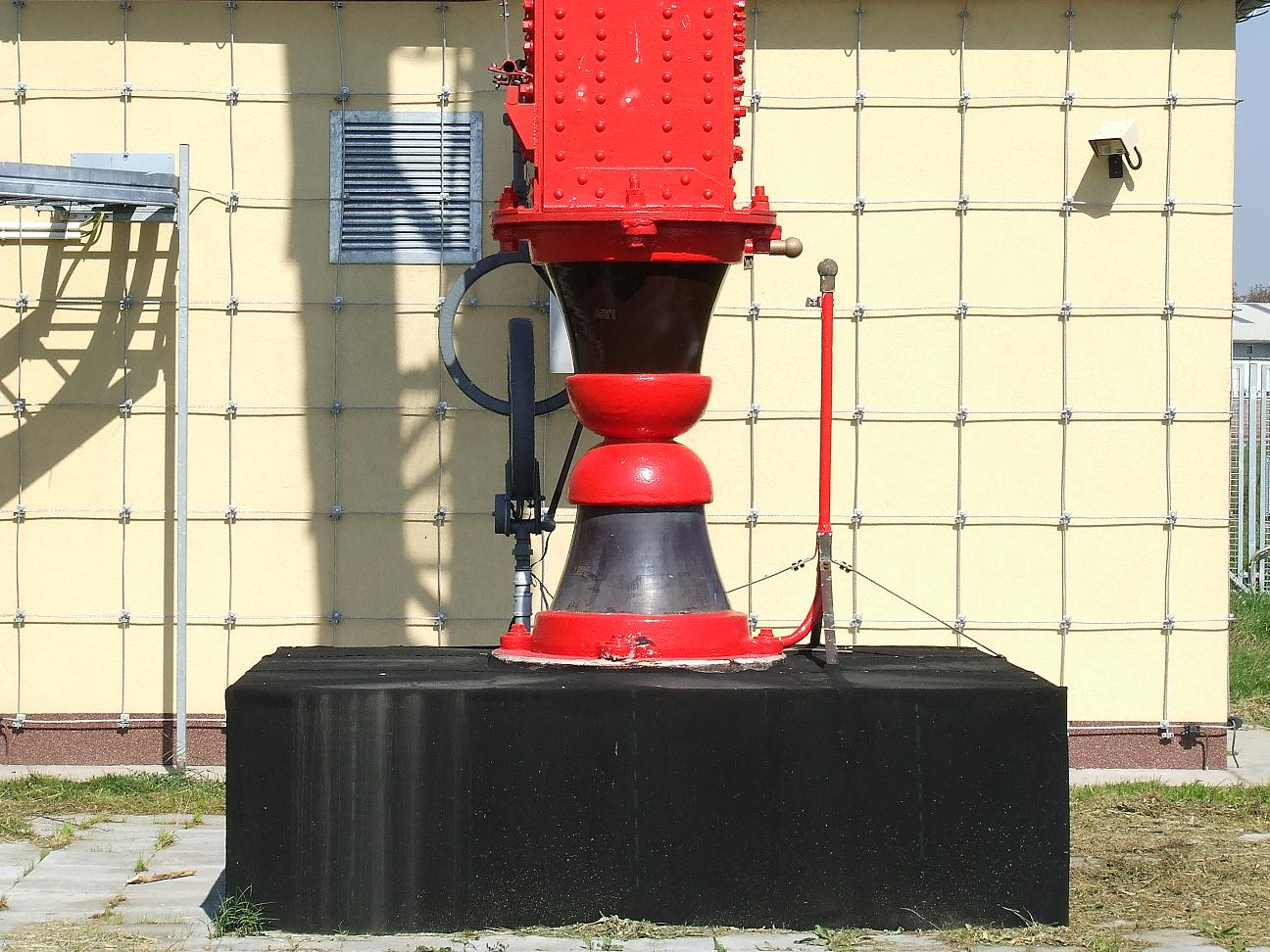
The base of Lakihegy Tower

== See also ==
- List of masts
- List of European medium wave transmitters
