= Danielle Jalowiecka =

British radio presenter, newsreader and musician

Danielle Jalowiecka (born 1986) is a British radio presenter, musician, newsreader and continuity announcer. She is a continuity announcer at BBC Radio 4 and BBC Radio 3, a newsreader at the BBC World Service and BFBS and BBC Radio 3, a presenter at BBC Radio 3 and a professional recorder player.

== Education ==
Jalowiecka was born in 1986 in Bath, Somerset. She began recorder lessons when she was eight years old. She attended St Augustine's Catholic College in Trowbridge, Wiltshire. While at secondary school, she won the Bath Young Musician of the Year award in 2003 for her recorder performance and played the recorder with the Bath Philharmonia Orchestra during the grand opening of the Bath International Music Festival. In 2007, Jalowiecka played the flute, piano and violin, and sang, in addition to playing the recorder. She obtained a first-class honours degree in recorder performance from the Royal College of Music in 2008. While at studying this degree, she spent a term studying at the Sydney Conservatorium of Music. She then studied a postgraduate diploma in Paris at the CNR Boulogne Billancourt.

== Career ==
In 2008 Jalowiecka obtained the runner-up place in the Performing Australian Music competition.

Also in 2008 Jalowiecka started playing as part of the iFlautisti quartet, a new self-formed quartet which featured Jalowiecka and three other women. As of 2011, a high level of originality was present in the group's performances. In 2011, they performed the world premiere of a work at the Czech Embassy in London.

Prior to being a continuity announcer at BBC Radio 3, a role which she started in 2018/2019, Jalowiecka toured Europe and the United Kingdom as part of a recorder quartet, with her quartet's work being broadcast on three BBC radio stations, and also commissioned musical works. Jalowiecka began presenting concerts for BBC Radio 3 in 2019 and began presenting the station's Through The Night programme in November 2022. She also reads the news and presents the weather on BBC Radio 3's Breakfast programme.

Jalowiecka moved to also working at BBC Radio 4 subsequent to beginning working at BBC Radio 3. Her role at BBC Radio 4 also involves presentation of the 12:48 am Shipping Forecast, and has in the past involved the presentation of a weather forecast and daytime Shipping Forecasts.

In the late 2010s Jalowiecka was an interviewer/reporter for the BBC World Service. As of January 2025, Jalowiecka had for several years read news bulletins on the BBC World Service's English-language service. As of January 2026, Jalowiecka also presents news bulletins on the British Forces Broadcasting Service.

== Personal life ==
As of 2020 Jalowiecka was married to the comedian, commentator and broadcaster Steve N Allen.

She is an avid fan of the music of David Bowie.
