= Blaw-Knox tower =

American radio towers

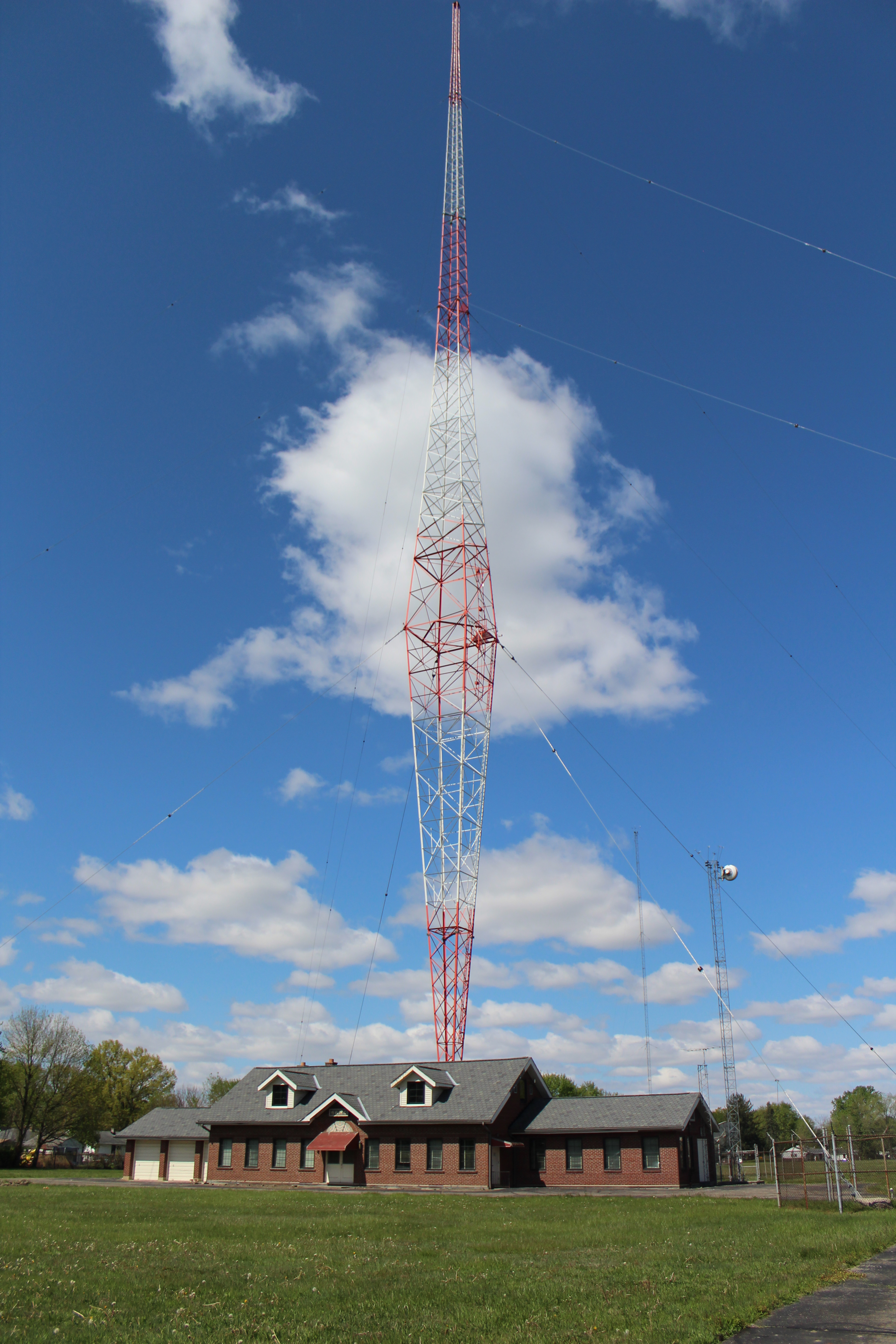
WBNS 380 ft (120 m) Blaw-Knox tower in Columbus, Ohio

The term Blaw-Knox tower (or radiator) usually refers to radio towers of a distinctive "diamond cantilever" design, stabilized by guy-wires attached only at the vertical center of the mast where its cross-section is widest. The Blaw-Knox company was an American manufacturer of steel structures and construction equipment based in Pittsburgh, Pennsylvania. During the 1930s AM radio broadcasting stations adopted single mast radiator antennas, and this Blaw-Knox design was the first type used. A 1942 advertisement claims that 70% of all radio towers in the United States at the time were built by Blaw-Knox.

The diamond-shaped towers became icons of early radio broadcasting in the US. Several are listed on the United States National Register of Historic Places, the distinctive diamond antenna design has been incorporated into logos of various organizations related to radio and a very large (scale) replica of the WSM (AM) Blaw-Knox tower has been built into the Country Music Hall of Fame and Museum.

== Design ==
The diamond-shaped tower was patented by Nicholas Gerten and Ralph Jenner for Blaw-Knox July 29, 1930. and was one of the first mast radiators. Previous antennas for medium and longwave broadcasting usually consisted of wires strung between masts, but in the Blaw-Knox antenna, as in modern AM broadcasting mast radiators, the metal mast structure functioned as the antenna. To prevent the high frequency potential on the mast from short-circuiting to ground, the narrow lower end of the tower rested on a ceramic insulator about three-foot wide, shaped like a ball and socket joint. Thus, the tower required guy-wires to hold it upright.

The distinguishing feature of the Blaw-Knox tower was its wide diamond (or rhomboidal, rhombohedron) shape, which served to make it rigid, to resist shear stresses. One advantage of this was to reduce the number of guys needed. Blaw-Knox masts required only one set of three or four guys, attached at the tower's wide "waist". In contrast, narrow masts require two to four sets of guys, attached at different heights, to prevent the tower from buckling. The advantage of fewer guys was to simplify the electrical design of the antenna, because conductive guys interfered with its radiation pattern. The guys acted as "parasitic" resonant elements, reradiating the radio waves in other directions and thus altering the antenna's radiation pattern. In some Blaw-Knox mast designs, the upper pyramidal section was made longer than the lower, to keep the attachment point of the guys as low as possible, to minimize their interference.

Another advantage mentioned in the patent was that the tower could be erected in two parts. Half of the mast could be built, then its wide central section could be used as a stable base on which to erect the other half.

A disadvantage of the diamond mast shape was that the current distribution on the tower caused less radio power to be radiated in horizontal directions and more at an angle into the sky, compared to a slender uniform width mast. Since AM radio stations covered their listening areas with ground waves, radio waves that traveled horizontally close to the ground surface, this meant the listening area was smaller. The realization of the nonideal radiation pattern of the design caused the diamond-shaped tower to fall out of favor in the 1940s in radio stations, replaced by the narrow uniform width lattice mast used today.

== Gallery ==
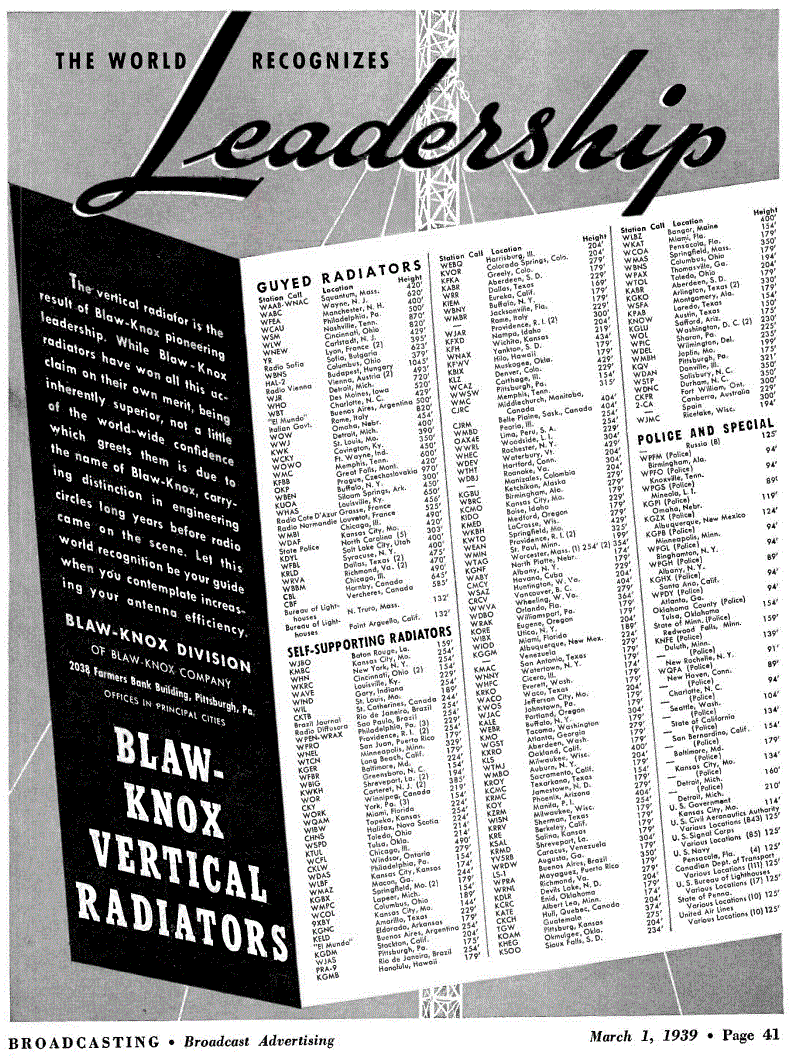
1939 company advertisement

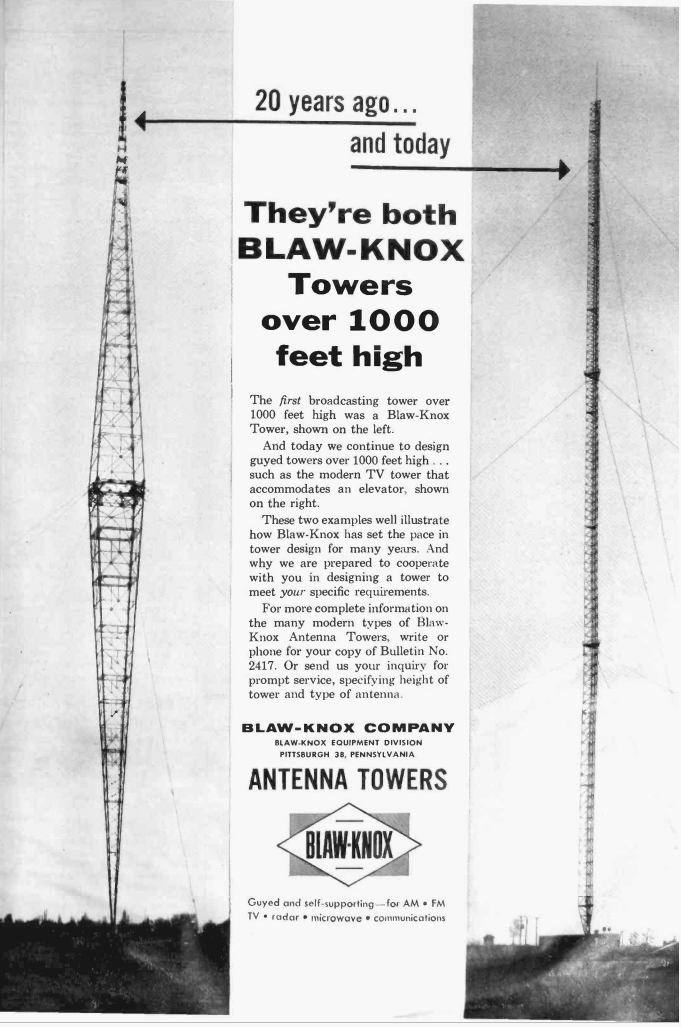
1955 company advertisement

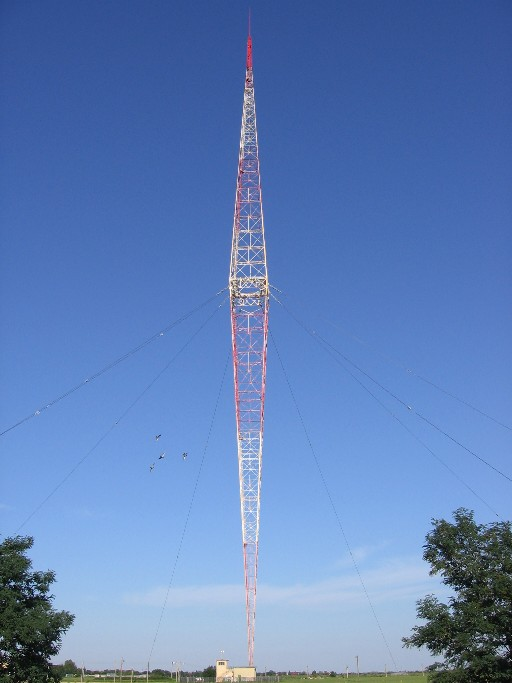
Lakihegy Tower, a 314-metre (1030 ft) Blaw-Knox mast at Szigetszentmiklós-Lakihegy, Hungary

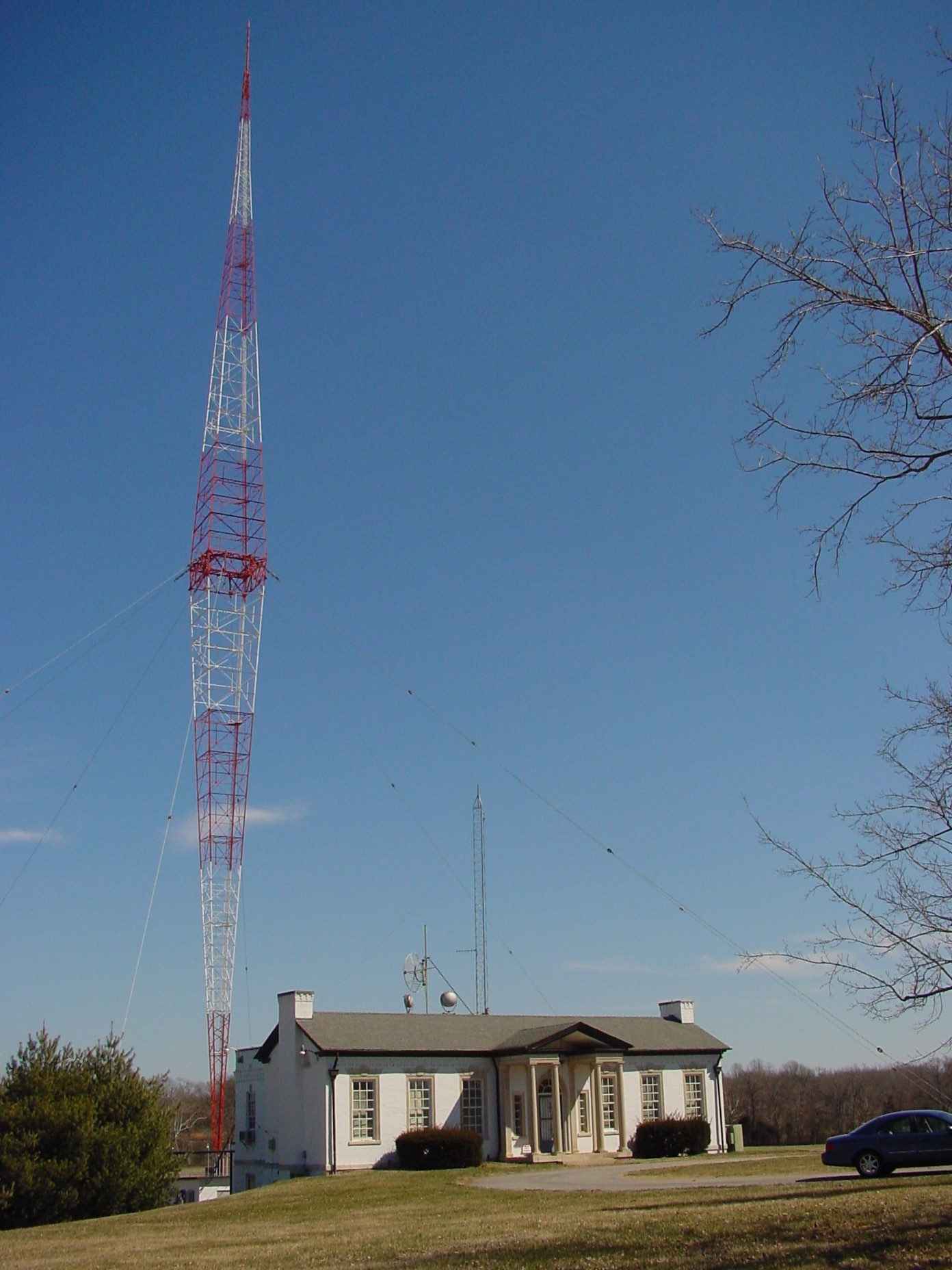
WSM 808-foot (246 m) tower, in the Nashville, Tennessee suburb of Brentwood, is the tallest in the United States.

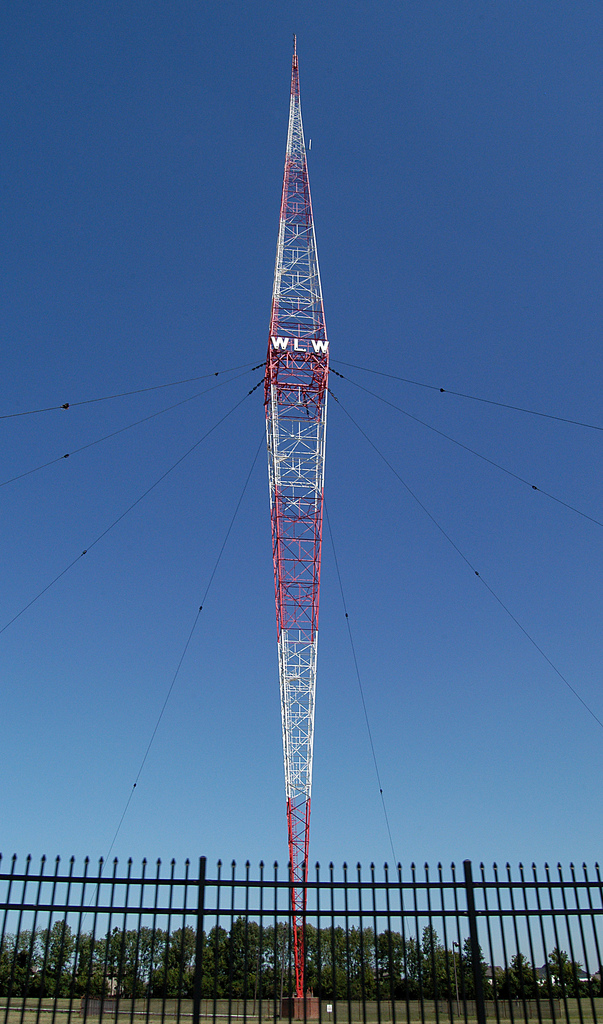
WLW's Blaw-Knox tower has been in use since 1934. (Note: WLW's antenna is featured on the official seal of the City of Mason. Designed and erected by the Blaw-Knox Tower company in 1934, it was the second of its type to be built, after WSM's, and is one of eight still operational in the United States.)

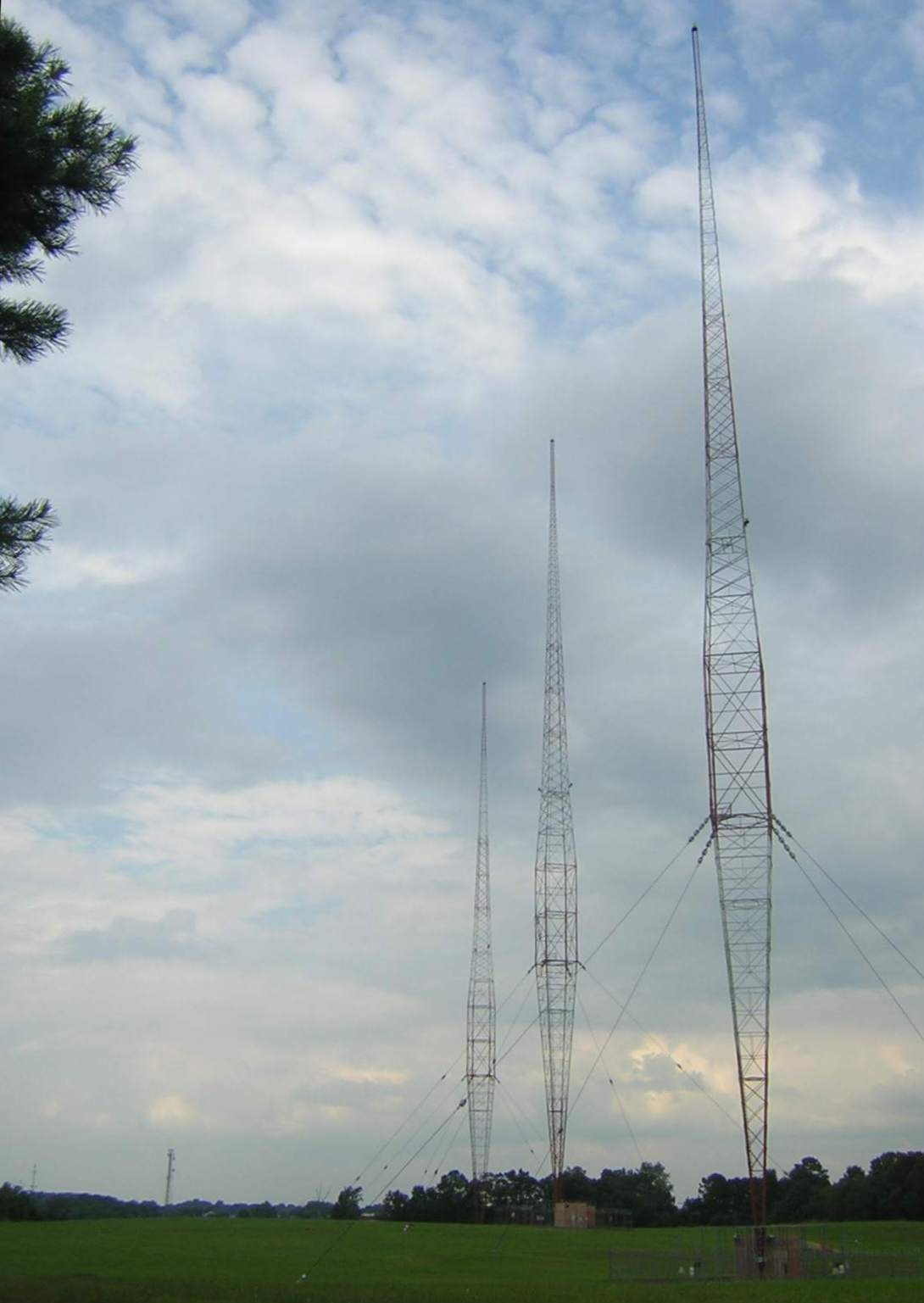
WBT 428–ft (130 m) towers, just south of uptown Charlotte, North Carolina.

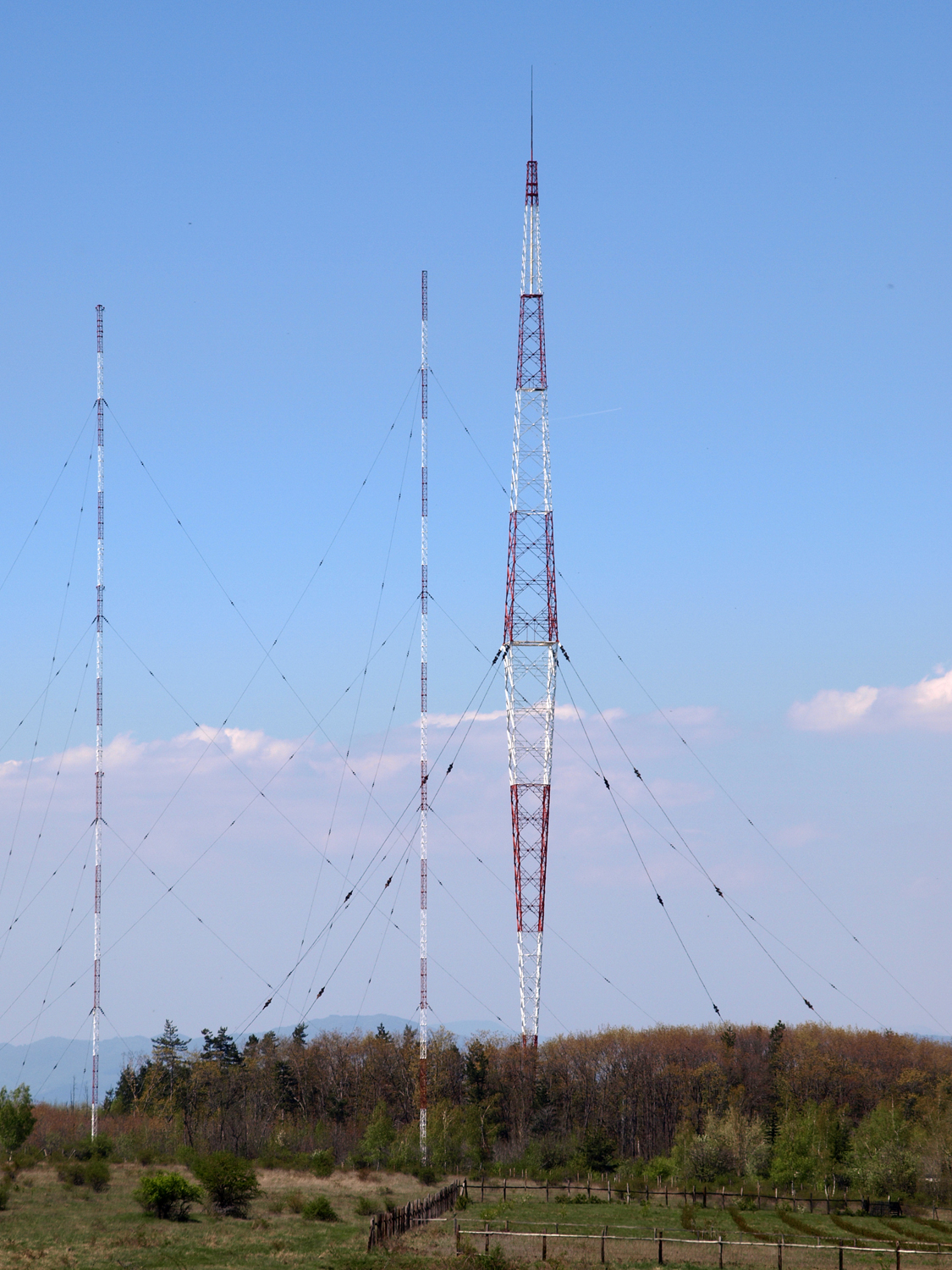
Vakarel radio transmitter

== List of Blaw-Knox towers ==
Many Blaw-Knox towers, of both conventional (uniform cross-section) and diamond design, remain in use in the United States. Few of the diamond towers were built, and several remain; all transmit AM radio signals. The most well-known example in Europe is the Lakihegy Tower, located in Szigetszentmiklós-Lakihegy, Hungary. Several additional diamond cantilever towers were built at stations in the Central Valley of California, but are less well known. These towers were much smaller in both height and cross-section than the towers listed elsewhere; only one — KSTN, Stockton — remains in use for broadcasting.

In the following chart: structure is no longer standing. structure has changed height. rebuilt structure.

| Tower | Year | Country | Town | Height m | Height ft | Remarks |
|---|---|---|---|---|---|---|
| Lakihegy Tower | 1946 | Hungary | Szigetszentmiklós-Lakihegy | 314 m | 1030 ft | Tallest Blaw-Knox ever built. The current tower is actually the second one to be built at the location. The original tower was built in 1933 but was destroyed at the end of World War II. |
| Liblice Blaw-Knox Radio Mast | 1936 | Czech Republic | Liblice | 280.40 m | 920 ft | demolished on October 17, 1972 |
| WSM Tower | 1932 | USA | Nashville, Tennessee | 246 m | 808 ft | The first Blaw-Knox tower ever built, originally 267 m (874 ft) in height |
| WLW Tower | 1934 | USA | Mason, Ohio | 227 m | 747 ft | The second of its type to be built, originally 253 m (831 ft) in height |
| Vakarel Blaw-Knox Radio Mast | 1937 | Bulgaria | Vakarel | 215 | 705 ft | Demolished 16 September 2020 |
| WBT Tower 1 | 1934 | USA | Charlotte, North Carolina | 130 m | 426 ft | Three towers in total, one original, two reproductions from the original plans after the originals were destroyed by Hurricane Hugo in 1989. |
| WBT Tower 2 | 1989 | USA | Charlotte, North Carolina | 130 m | 426 ft | The first Blaw-Knox towers to be built in over 40 years, as well as the last |
| WBT Tower 3 | 1989 | USA | Charlotte, North Carolina | 130 m | 426 ft | |
| WADO Tower | 1934 | USA | Carlstadt, New Jersey | 129 m | 424 ft | Demolished on October 17, 1999 |
| LVRTC Riga Blaw Knox Radiator | 1947 | Latvia | Riga | 125 m | 410 ft | Demolished in 2010 |
| WFEA Tower | 1931 | USA | Manchester, New Hampshire | 121 m | 396 ft | |
| WBNS Tower | | USA | Columbus, Ohio | 116 m | 380 ft | |
| Lisnagarvey Mast | 1936 | UK | Lisnagarvey | 99 m | 325 ft | Originally 144.8 meters (475 ft) in height |
| Stara Zagora Blaw-Knox Radio Mast | | Bulgaria | Stara Zagora | 88 m | 288 ft | Demolished 2014 |
| KSTN Tower | | USA | Stockton, California | 49 m | 162 ft | Variation of the typical Blaw-Knox tower as it is guyed both at the middle and top of the tower. |

Three other Blaw-Knox towers of unknown heights also used to exist but have since been removed for the following stations: WABC in Wayne, N.J.; WCAU in Newtown Square, Pennsylvania; and WHO in Des Moines, Iowa.

Blaw-Knox also constructed a 469-foot (143 m) tall tower in 1948 for WKQI (then known as WLDM) located on Ten Mile Road in the Detroit suburb of Oak Park, Michigan. However, unlike its namesake diamond cantilever form, this structure was built as a conventional four-sided self-supporting lattice tower.

== See also ==
- Blawnox, Pennsylvania
- Radio masts and towers
- Skylon (Festival of Britain)
