= La Cheminée du roi René =

Suite for wind quintet by Darius Milhaud

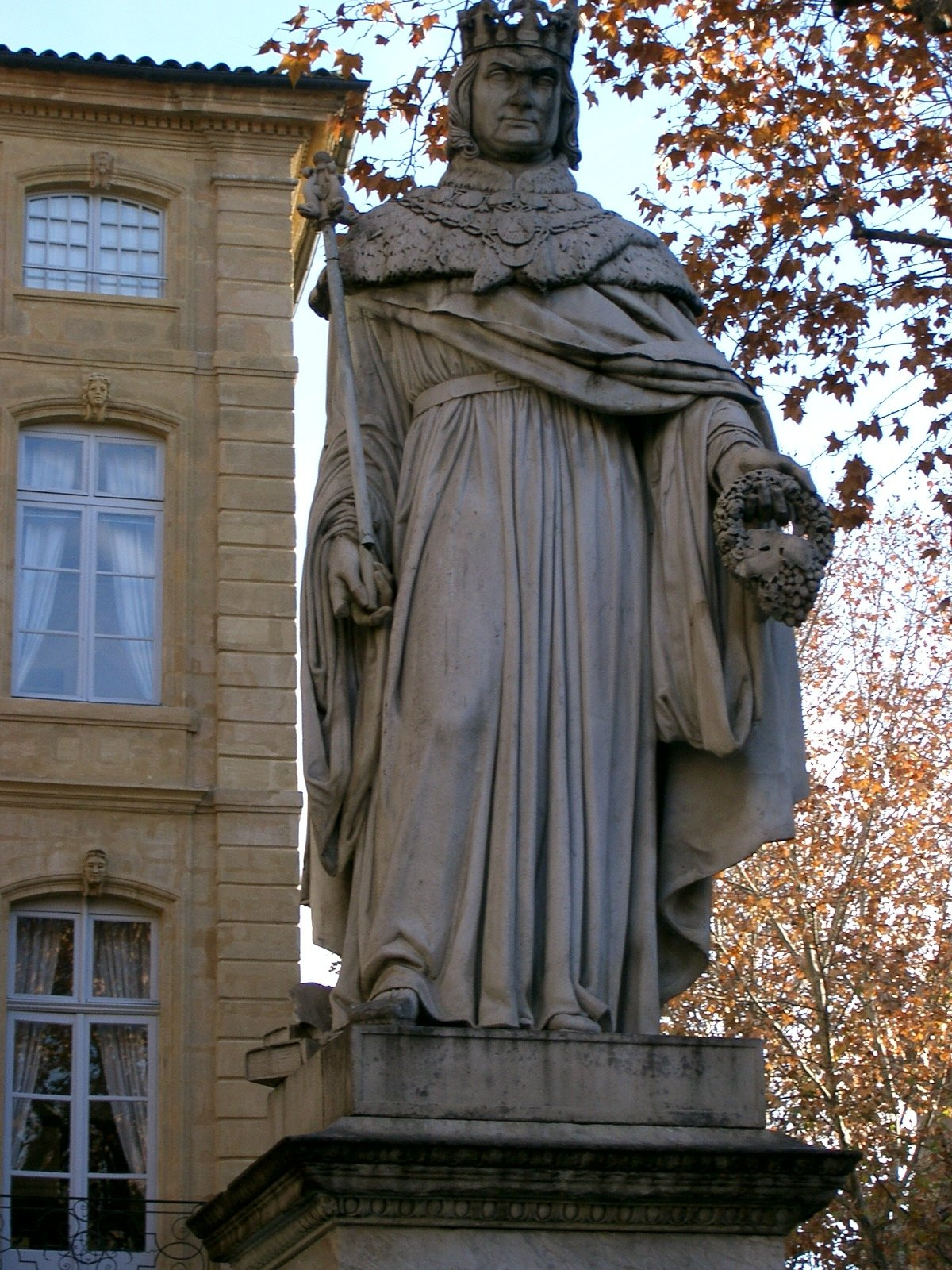
Statue of the Good King René in Aix-en-Provence

La Cheminée du roi René (The Chimney of King René), Op. 205, is a suite in seven movements for wind quintet, composed in 1939 by the French composer Darius Milhaud. The title alludes to a Provençal proverb playing on words for 'fireplace', 'chimney' and 'promenade': the 15th-century King of Sicily René d'Anjou is said to have enjoyed walks in the winter sun of Provence.

== Background ==
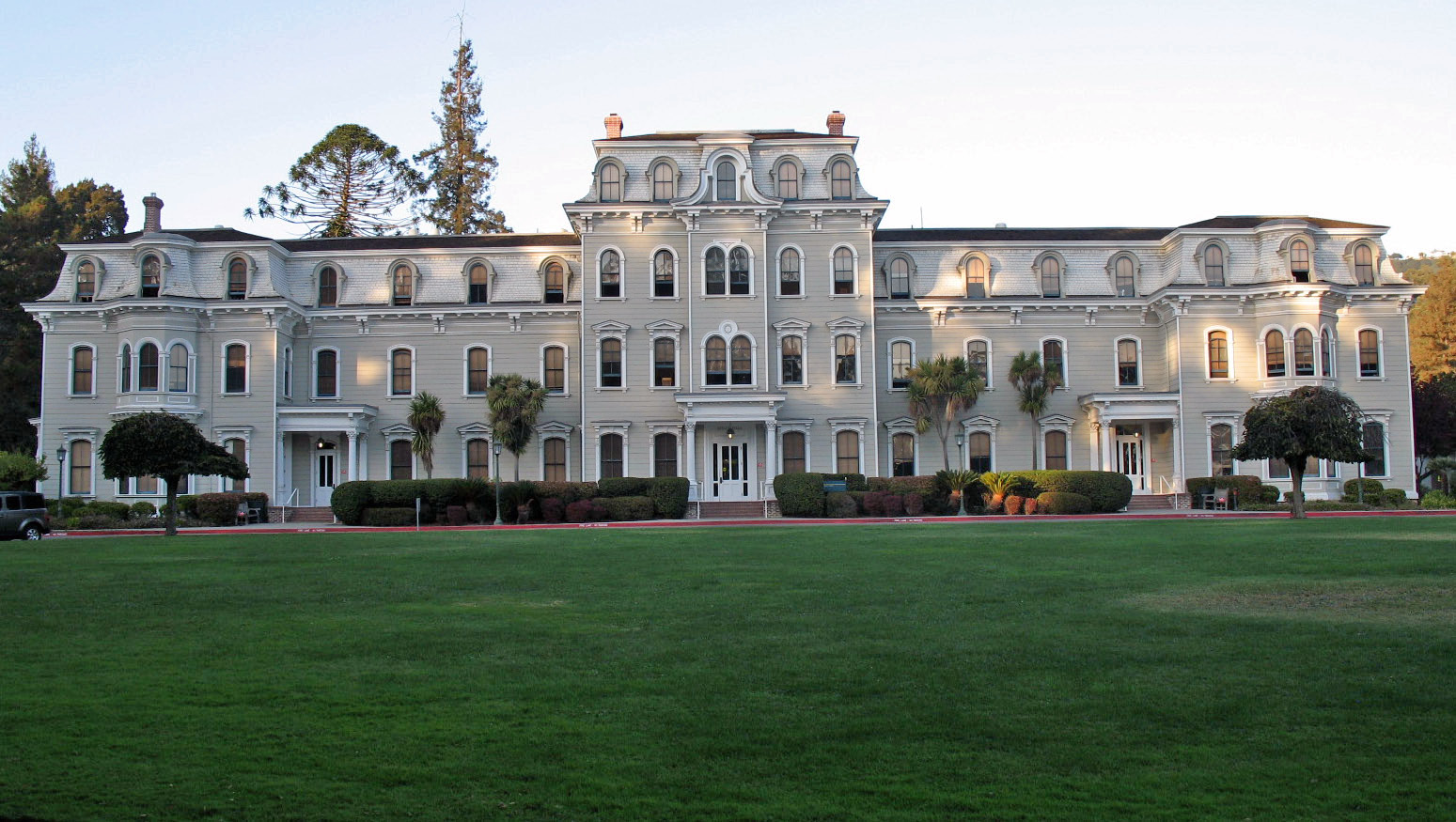
Mills Hall at Mills College, Oakland, California. Milhaud taught in the music department when the first performance of the suite was given by the South Wind Quintet in 1941.

The suite is an adaptation of the music that the composer wrote for Raymond Bernard's 1939 film Cavalcade d'amour. It was first performed in 1941 at Mills College in Oakland, California. The screenplay by Jean Anouilh and Jean Aurenche portrays three love stories set in three different centuries (medieval, 1830, 1930), with incidental music by the composers Darius Milhaud and Arthur Honegger, orchestrated by the conductor Roger Désormière. Milhaud chose the medieval court of René I in the fifteenth century.

The castle and the court of René I, count of Provence, were situated in Aix-en-Provence, where Milhaud grew up and who was always fascinated by the history of the king, his code of chivalry and the legendary tournaments that took place at his court. Although the composer studied several musical manuscripts of the period, the writing of La Cheminée du roi René shows very little evidence of this; the piece bears the characteristic hallmarks of the rest of Milhaud's music.

The title of the piece can be found in a nineteenth-century short story on "Le Bon Roi René" and courtly love, "Le premier bouquet de fleurs d'oranger" by Louis Lurine for the literary journal L'Écho des feuilletons, published in 1853; the journal is a collection of anecdotes and legends, of which the Provençal saying se chauffer à la cheminée du roi René is one. Prior occurrences of the expression can be found in French dictionaries of proverbs from the late eighteenth and early nineteenth century. In Sir Walter Scott's historical novel Anne of Geierstein, translated almost immediately into French, René of Anjou appears as one of the characters; Scott used the phrase "King René's chimney" to describe his favourite pleasure of promenading outdoors in the sun.

== Structure ==
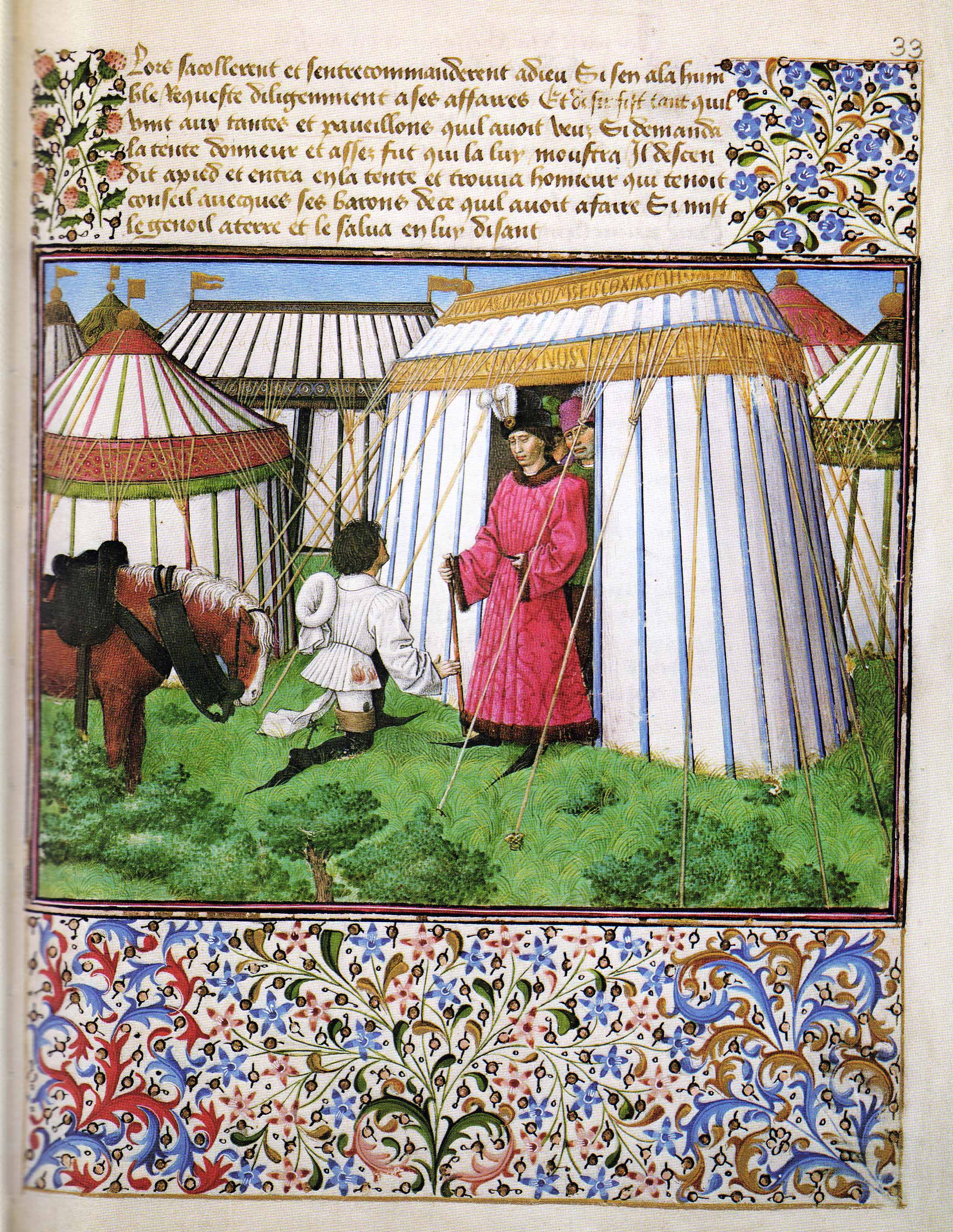
The Livre de cœur d'amour épris of René I, illuminated manuscript by Barthélemy d'Eyck, c. 1460

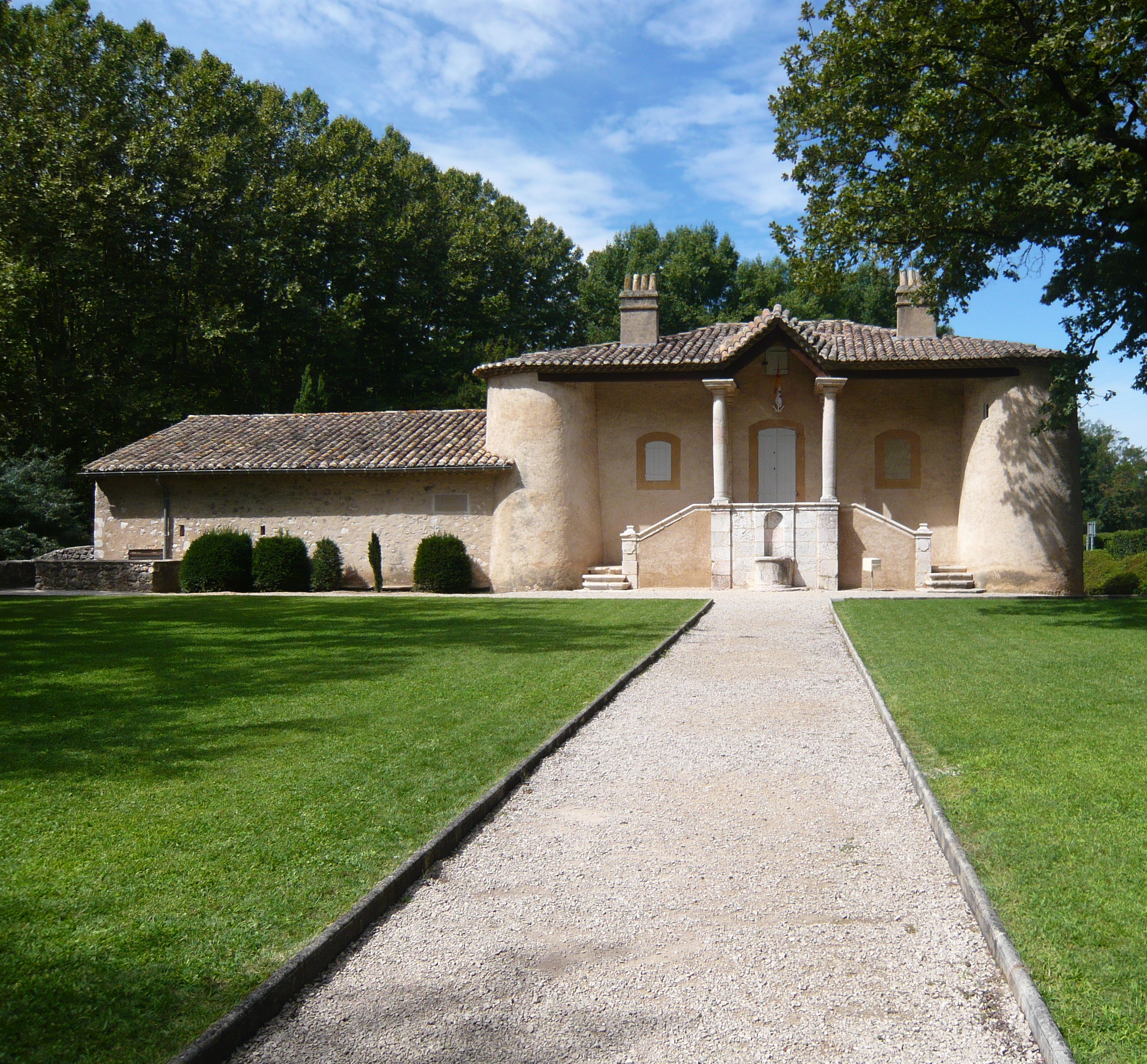
16th-century lodge in Valabre called the hunting pavilion of Roi René

The seven movements of the suite, written for flute, oboe, clarinet, horn and bassoon, have the following titles:

1. Cortège (procession)
2. Aubade (dawnsong)
3. Jongleurs (jugglers)
4. La maousinglade (sarabande)
5. Joutes sur l'Arc (jousting on the River Arc)
6. Chasse à Valabre (hunting at Valabre) (Note: The hunting pavilion of Roi René is a sixteenth-century building in the Domaine de Valabre, Gardanne, a site dating back to the thirteenth century. The Seigneurie of Gardanne was acquired in 1454 by René, who administered it until his death in 1480; apart from establishing the domain as an agricultural centre for viticulture, sheep-rearing and olive-growing, he used it as a base for hunting and fishing.)
7. Madrigal nocturne (nocturnal madrigal)

All the movements are very short, with an alternation between "nonchalant" and very rapid tempi: a collection of medieval miniatures. The shortest movement is less than a minute in length, while the longest is only three minutes long. This gives the impression of a single piece, in just one breath, even more so because the musical atmosphere changes so little between different movements. In all the suite lasts around thirteen minutes.

La maousinglade, a discrete sarabande with the theme taken up by the oboe, is particularly striking. The Joutes sur l'Arc is replete with renaissance ornamentation, while the hunting horn is evoked in the Chasse à Valabre. The final Madrigal, calm, restful and very neoclassical, brings the work to a melancholy close.

La Cheminée du roi René is one of Milhaud's best-known works and is one of the most popular pieces of chamber music in the twentieth-century repertoire for wind quintet. Belgian musicologist and biographer of Milhaud Paul Collaer writes that "among the wind quintets, the amusing La Cheminée du roi René (1939) is especially worthy of note. Its folkish, Provençal character has made it almost as famous as Le bœuf sur le toit and La création du monde." The opening motif of Madrigal nocturne, performed by the BBC Concert Orchestra, is used as the signature melody by Sveriges Radio P2 and BBC Radio 3 in their six-hour Through the Night programme.

== Notes and references ==
=== Sources ===
- Collaer, Paul (1988). Darius Milhaud. Translated by Jane Highfeld Galante. Macmillan. ISBN 978-1-349-10653-0.
