= Riga LVRTC Transmitter =

Communication tower near Riga, Latvia

Coordinates: 56°56′16.8″N 24°16′56.7″E

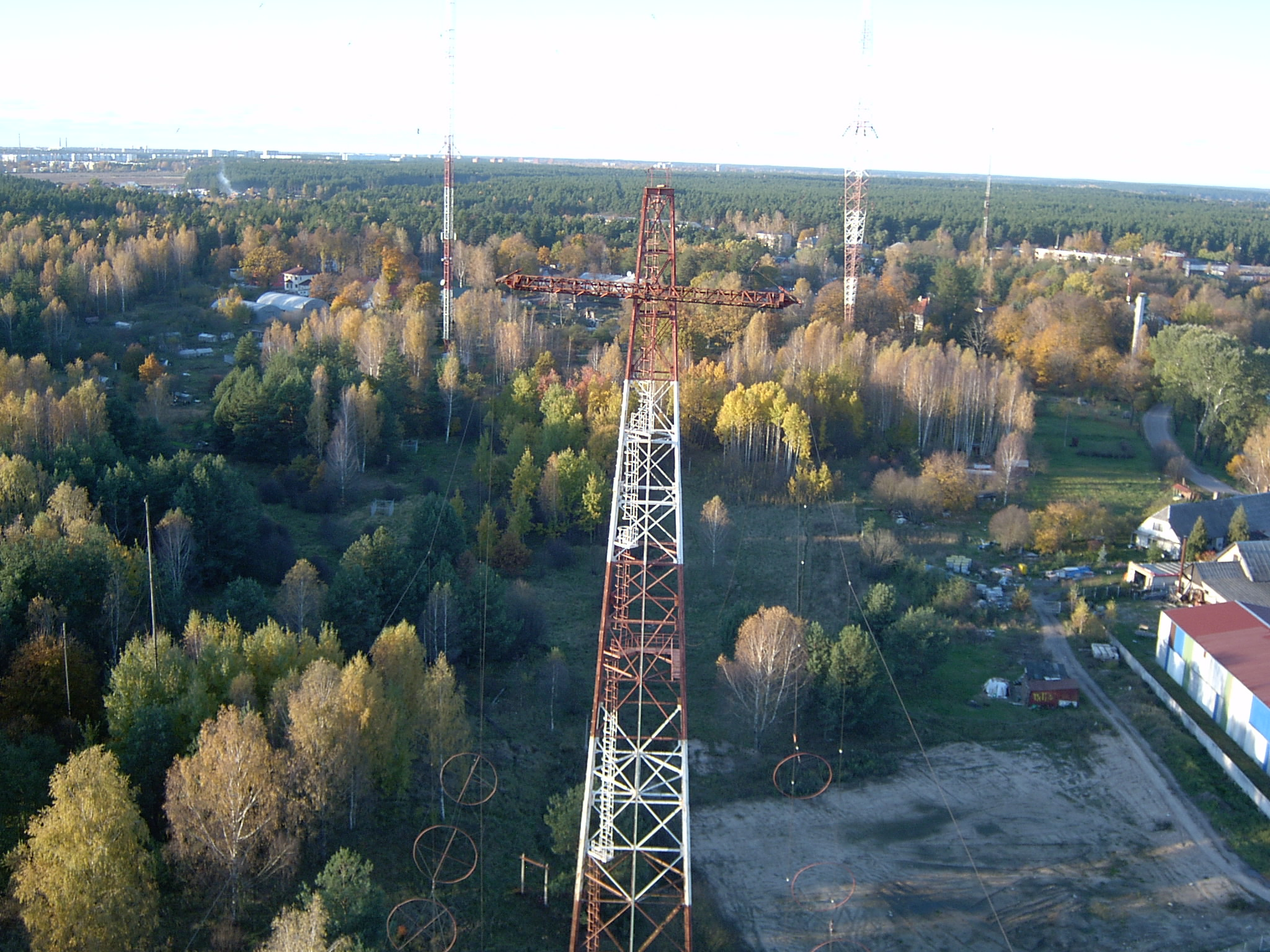
Riga LVRTC Transmitter in 2006

The Riga LVRTC Transmitter was a mediumwave transmitter in Ulbroka near Riga, Latvia, which broadcast on 945 kHz a music program in DRM-simulcast mode, which was receivable at night time in wide parts of Europe. It used as an antenna two guyed mast radiators. One of them was a 125 m-tall (410 ft) guyed lattice mast. The other smaller tower stays a Blaw-Knox Radiator. It is one of the few existing Blaw-Knox Radiators in Europe. Other towers of this type exist at Lisnagarvey, Northern Ireland, Lakihegy, Hungary, Vakarel, Bulgaria and Stara Zagora, Bulgaria.

Several masts were razed on 16 May 2010.

The tallest mast of the station, which has a height of 205 metres, is still standing and used for FM-broadcasting .

== Transmitted programmes ==
Station	Frequency	Power (ERP)
LR 5	93.1 MHz	8.9 kW
Radio Marija Latvija	97.3 MHz	2.6 kW
EHR Latviešu Hiti	101 MHz	2.2kW
