= Horizont (radio station) =

Bulgarian radio station

Horizont Radio
- Bulgaria
- Frequency: See list

Programming
- Language: Bulgarian
- Format: News and music

Ownership
- Owner: Bulgarian National Radio

History
- First air date: June 1930; 96 years ago
- Former frequencies: See the second list below

Links
- Website: www.bnr.bg

Horizont Radio or Horizont (Bulgarian: Хоризонт) is a state-owned Bulgarian radio station specializing in news coverage from Bulgaria. It is one of the country's most popular radio stations and is operated by Bulgarian National Radio.

Horizont Radio provides news and commentary from across Bulgaria and maintains a network of correspondents in major cities throughout the country. Its programming includes music from a range of genres, with a focus on contemporary pop music. The station's motto is "Quick and in-depth".

== History ==
Horizon Radio is part of the Bulgarian National Radio. The Bulgarian National Radio (Българско национално радио, Balgarsko natsionalno radio; abbreviated БНР, BNR) is the state-owned national radio network of Bulgaria. It was founded on 30 March 1930 as Rodno radio ("Native radio") by a group of intellectuals. Broadcasting began in June the same year. Rodno Radio was renamed Radio Sofija (Radio Sofia) in 1934.

== News coverage ==
Horizon Radio broadcasts news bulletins on top of the hour with extensive news programmes at 12 pm, 6 pm and midnight. The bulk of the interviews and comments come in mornings and evenings, so that almost everyone in country tunes in first thing in the morning for the latest news. The programme also offers sports news and has a weather forecast every three hours live from the meteorological office.

== Music ==
Horizon Radio is notable for the wide range of music it plays. While most commercial stations concentrate on a particular theme, such as 1980s music or "classic rock", Horizon plays a diverse mix of current songs, including independent/alternative, rock, house/electronica, drum 'n' bass, world, pop and rap. In recent years the radio has attracted many teenage listeners because of the quality music the radio plays.

== Notable shows ==
- "12+3" kicks off at 12 o'clock and ends at 3 o'clock in the afternoon, hence the name. It's the most popular radio programme in Bulgaria. The show offers pop music, live interviews and comments. The presenters are often young and witty giving the programme a youthful sound.
- "A Jump Ahead" kicks off at 7 am and finishes at 10 am concentrating on live interviews and debates.
- "Horizon For You" airs listeners' announcements about weddings, birthday parties etc.
- "Sunday 150" is broadcast Sundays from 10 am to 12 and is dedicated exclusively to politics.

== Broadcast frequencies ==
Coverage in Bulgaria on FM sorted by frequency.

Transmitter	Frequency (MHz)	Power (kW)
Sliven	87.8	1.00
Aytos	88.0	0.10
Kaliyakra	88.1	1.00
Borovets	88.2	0.10
Pustrets	88.8	0.50
Jablanica	89.2	0.10
Ivailovgrad	91.6	0.10
Nikopol	96.4	0.10
Svilengrad	99.7	3.00
Gotse Delchev	100.3	10.00
Varna	100.9	5.00
Petrohan	101.4	10.00
Smolyan	101.6	5.00
Shumen	102.0	10.00
Kuystendil	102.1	10.00
Belogradchik	102.3	10.00
Pravets	102.4	0.25
Burgas	102.5	10.00
Pleven	102.7	1.00
Provadia	102.9	0.10
Sofia	103.0	10.00
Rousse	103.0	10.00
Silistra	103.3	0.25
Dobrich	104.3	3.00
Kardzhali	105.0	10.00
Vidin/Gramada (MW/AM)	576 kHz	270.00

Horizont Radio is also available on as a web stream. See link below.

Horizont Radio was formerly available on longwave via Vakarel transmitter and on some mediumwave transmitters before between 2010-2014. From 2015 the only active mediumwave transmitter is from Vidin.

Full list of former frequencies:

Transmitter	LW Frequency (kHz)	Power (kW)
Vakarel	261 (+ Parliamentary channel)	75.00

Transmitter	MW Frequency (kHz)	Power (kW)
Pleven	594	250.00
Petrich	747 (+ R. Bulgaria for the Balkans)	500.00
Shumen	747 (+ R. Bulgaria in Turkish)	10.00
Razgrad	864 (+ R. Bulgaria in Turkish)	10.00
Kresna	963	40.00
Kardzhali	963 (+ R. Bulgaria in Turkish)	50.00
Malko Tarnovo	963	5.00
Sofia	963	40.00
Varna	1143	40.00
Dulovo	1161 (+ R. Bulgaria in Turkish)	10.00
Stara Zagora	1161	500.00
Targovishte	1161 (+ R. Bulgaria in Turkish)	10.00
Vidin/Gramada	1224 (+ R. Bulgaria for the Balkans)	500.00
Suvorovo	1485	5.00
Dobrich	1584	10.00

== See also ==
- Eastern Bloc information dissemination
