= Hristo Botev Radio =

Bulgarian radio station

Hristo Botev Radio Програма Христо Ботев
- Bulgaria
- Frequency: See list

Programming
- Language: Bulgarian
- Format: Culture and education

Ownership
- Owner: Bulgarian National Radio

History
- First air date: 23 July 1941; 85 years ago

Links
- Website: Official website

Hristo Botev Radio (Bulgarian: Програма Христо Ботев) is a state-owned Bulgarian radio station, part of the Bulgarian National Radio Network. Hristo Botev Radio broadcasts around the clock and is dedicated to culture and education.

== Music ==
Classical music, opera, and concerts are broadcast in high-quality sound, often live and in front of an audience. Journalistic commentaries as well as interviews with the artists feature throughout. The station's website has also a section for streaming live concerts so they can be heard online.

== Programmes ==
Hristo Botev is the only Bulgarian radio station to broadcast radio drama, foreign-language courses, and educational programmes based on contemporary international issues. On Monday to Friday mornings there is the talk show "Our Day" ("Нашият ден") with specialised content for each day of the week - economics, law, social, domestic, and foreign politics. From 3:00 to 5:00 o'clock there is the classical music programme "Euroclassic Notturno" ("Еврокласик ноктюрно"). On Saturday mornings six hours of programming under the overall title of "Family Radio" ("Семейно радио") presents a wide range of information and entertainment for all, together with audience participation. Other programmes include the humorous "Comic Academy" ("Академия комика") and "Cabaret" ("Кабаре"); items for children; and several programmes dedicated to folk traditions, religion, European integration, and (uniquely among Bulgarian radio stations) the country's different ethnic groups.

== Broadcast frequencies ==
Transmitter	Frequency in MHz	Power (kW)
Aytos	88.00	0.10
Belogradchik	88.20	10.00
Burgas	95.30	1.00
Varna	104.80	1.00
Vratsa	97.80	0.45
Botev Peak	92.20	10.00
Gotse Delchev	98.50	1.00
Dobrich	102.30	1.00
Kavarna	90.10	10.00
Kresna	89.70	0.50
Kardzhali	99.20	1.00
Kyustendil	99.30	10.00
Pleven	100.20	0.93
Plovdiv	91.70	1.00
Popovo	98.40	0.50
Pravets	98.40	0.25
Razgrad	99.40	0.50
Targovishte	95.40	0.50
Tsarevo	90.80	5.00
Ruse	95.70	1.00
Svilengrad	94.90	3.00
Silistra	107.20	1.00
Sliven	98.70	1.00
Smolyan	96.00	1.00
Sofia	92.90	10.00
Stara Zagora	98.30	1.00
Shumen	100.40	1.00
Yablanitsa	95.00	1.00
Yakoruda	105.60	0.235

Program Hristo Botev was also available on mediumwave via 7 transmitters, but on 6th of April 2010 due to high costs of the transmissions, six of the transmitters were shut down, and on 29th of February 2012, the last transmitter was shut down.

Transmitter	Frequency in kHz	Power (kW)
Vidin	576	500.00
Kresna	702	40.00
Sofia (via Stolnik)	828	50.00
Shumen	828	500.00
Pleven	1296	30.00
Kardzhali	1296	150.00
Haskovo	1485	3.00
