= Lisnagarvey transmitting station =

Transmitter tower near Lisburn, Northern Ireland

Lisnagarvey
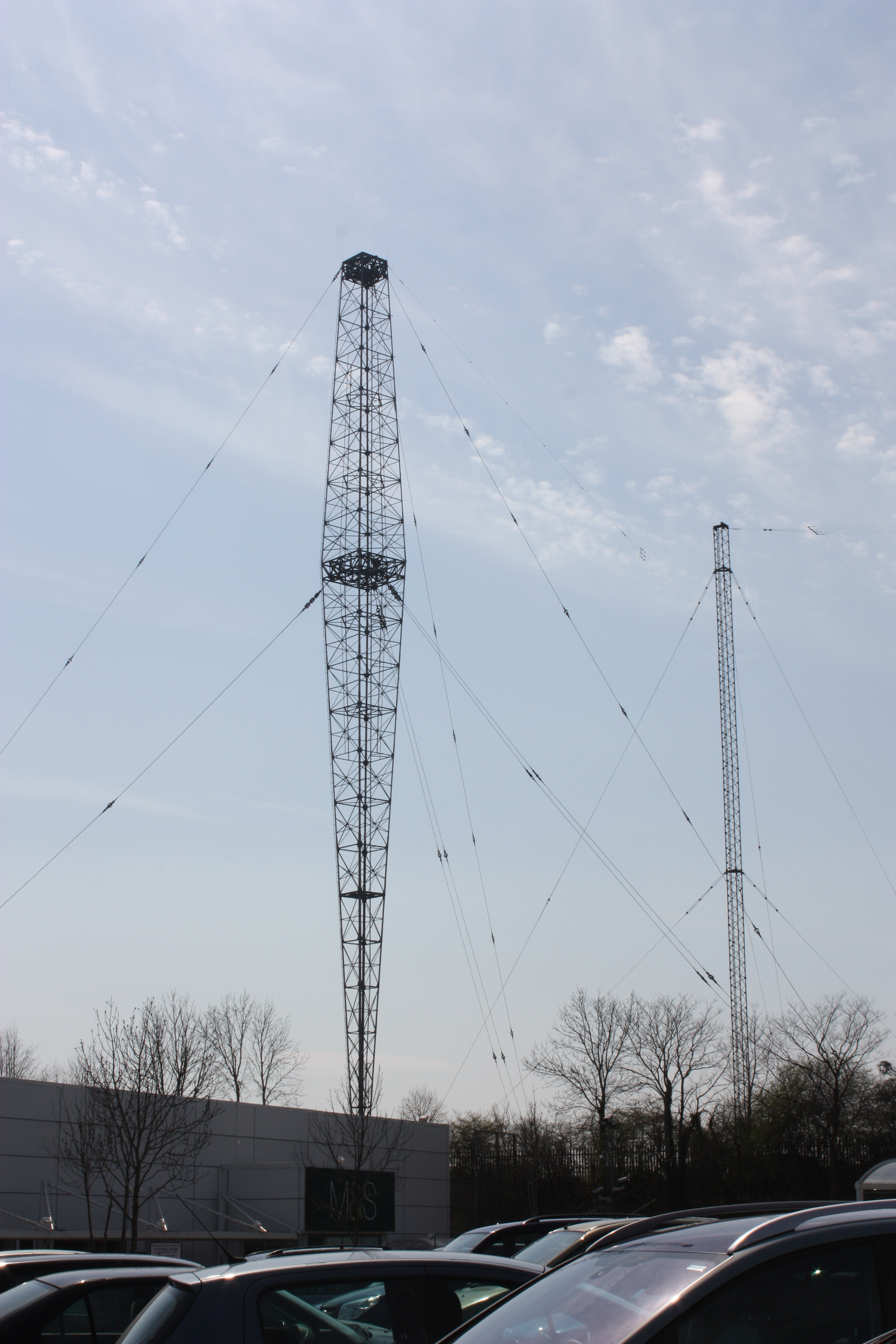
- Lisnagarvey mast viewed from Sprucefield

- Location within Northern Ireland
- Mast height: 99 metres (325 ft)
- Coordinates: 54.489722°N 6.060278°W
- Grid reference: J257619
- Built: 1936

The Lisnagarvey transmitting station is a facility for mediumwave broadcasting located in the townland of Magherageery, on the southern edge of Lisburn, Northern Ireland (grid reference J257619). It is close to Sprucefield shopping centre and about one mile from the middle of Lisburn.

The station was built by the BBC for the Regional Programme to be transmitted to Northern Ireland and it went into service in 1936. It is now owned by Arqiva.

During World War II, a 100 kW shortwave transmitter (Marconi model SWB18) was installed at the station as an alternative to the well-known one at Daventry in England, in case that one should suffer from an enemy attack. It transmitted on 6140 or 6145 kHz, and used the call sign GRW. The shortwave transmitter was taken out of service on 26 May 1946 and was later redeployed at the BBC Far Eastern Relay station at Tebrau, Malaya in January 1951.

The station includes three radio masts, including two standard lattice masts and one Blaw-Knox diamond cantilever vertical radiator. The two standard lattice masts have a wire slung T-antenna suspended between them. The Blaw-Knox radiator is the only one of its kind in Western Europe. The height of a vertical radiator is related to the frequency (or wavelength) of the service transmitted, and for maximum efficiency should be one half of the station's wavelength. Its height was originally 144.8 metres (475 ft), but it was shortened when the station's broadcast frequency was changed.

Similar masts in Europe can be found nowadays only at Lakihegy, Hungary, at Riga, Latvia, and at Vakarel, Bulgaria.

BBC Radio Ulster's service from the transmitter on 1341 kHz ended on Thursday 6 May 2021 at 0930 UTC, as part of the BBC's programme of switching off their medium wave services around the UK.

BBC Radio 4's medium wave service from this transmitter along with all of the other BBC Radio 4 medium wave transmitters ended on 15 April 2024, following by a retune loop informing listeners to retune to other methods of reception.

== Transmitted services ==
=== Analogue radio (AM medium wave) ===
Frequency	kW	Service
909 kHz	5	BBC Radio 5 Live

==== Former ====
Frequency	kW	Service	Switch-off date
720 kHz	10	BBC Radio 4	15 April 2024
1089 kHz	12.5	Talksport	8 April 2025
1215 kHz	16	Absolute Radio	20 January 2023
1341 kHz	162	BBC Radio Ulster	6 May 2021

== See also ==
- List of masts
- List of towers
- List of radio stations in the United Kingdom
