= Vakarel radio transmitter =

Coordinates: 42°33′N 23°43′E

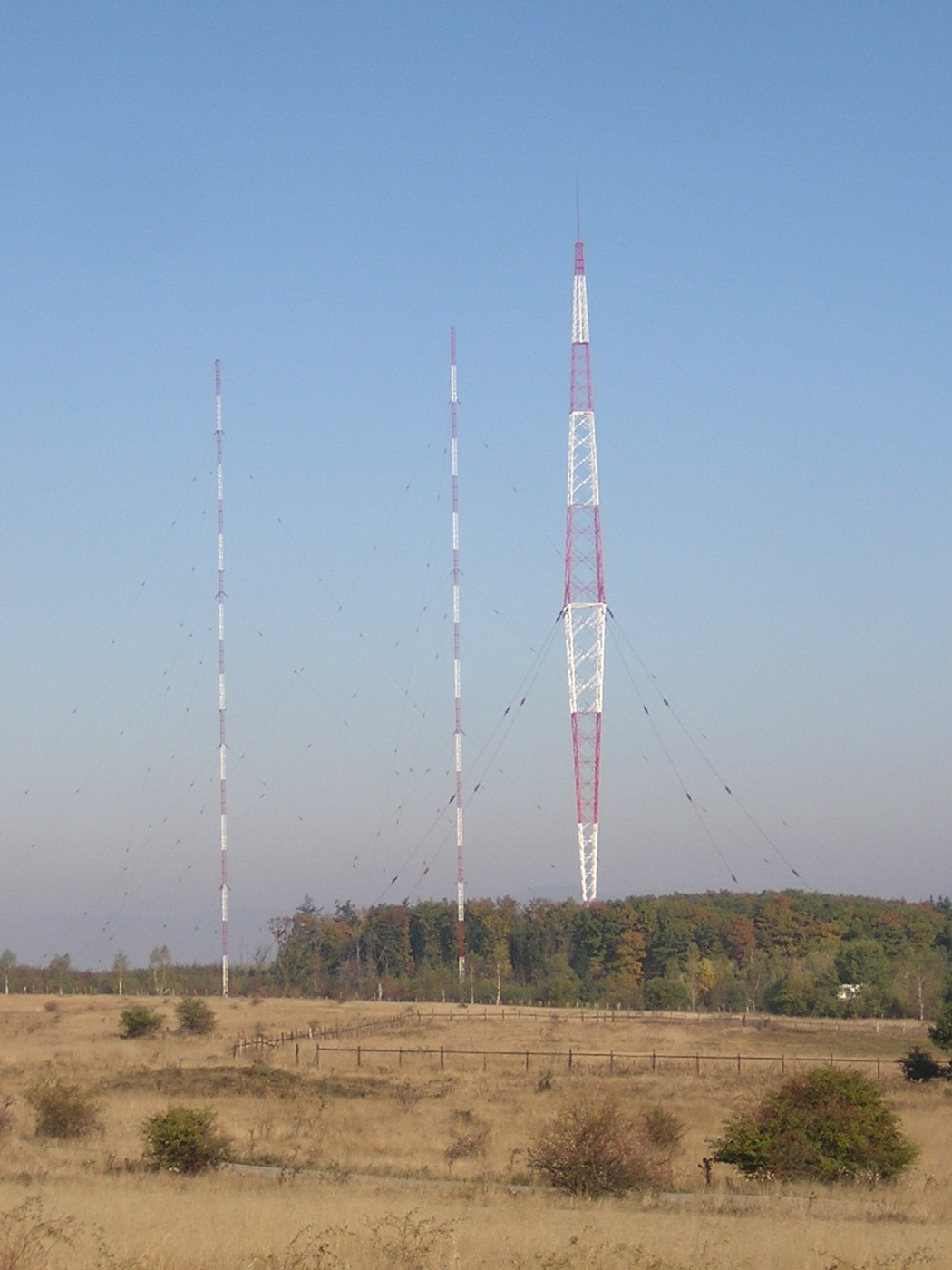
The Vakarel Blaw-Knox tower and two of the other masts

The Vakarel Transmitter was a large broadcasting facility for long- and medium wave near Vakarel, Bulgaria. The Vakarel Transmitter was inaugurated in 1937. It had one directional antenna consisting of three guyed masts and another consisting of two masts.

The most remarkable mast of the Vakarel Transmitter was the 215 m-tall (705 ft) Blaw-Knox tower, built in 1937 by the company Telefunken. Along with Lakihegy Tower, Hungary, Riga LVRTC Transmitter, Latvia and Lisnagarvey Radio Mast, Northern Ireland it was one of the few Blaw-Knox towers in Europe until its demolition on 16 September 2020.

The transmitter was shut down at 22:00 UTC on 31 December 2014.

== Transmitter internal structure ==
The modulation method used by the transmitter in Vakarel is called a tube voltage modulation and was successfully used in all powerful AM transmitters at that time. The Vakarel transmitter is supplied with electricity from a substation in Samokov via a medium voltage transmission line. The transmitter uses six stages of amplification. The first stage contains a single radio tube, which generates alternating current at a carrier frequency of 850 kHz. The electrical oscillations of the anode circuit in the tube are coupled in series to the second and third stage. The signals in these three stages are only amplified, without any other changes.

In the special fourth modulation stage, the form of signals is modulated with speech or music. The audio recordings are sent to the transmitter with an underground communication cable from the main radio studio in Sofia. Due to the large distance of almost 36 km (22 mi), the audio signal is amplified at both ends by separate blocks of amplifiers.

The fifth stage consists of six transmitting tubes, two of which are in reserve, and four others can be switched on, if necessary. All of them are water-cooled.

The final sixth stage consists of four high-power transmitting tubes amplifying the final output up to 100 kW. The energy is filtered by a high-power tuned circuit and sent to the feeder of the antenna, which is mounted on a large insulator on the ground and suspended with four guy lines with strain insulators.

== See also ==
- List of tallest towers
- List of tallest structures in Bulgaria
