= Bulgarian National Radio =

National radio broadcaster

Bǎlgarsko Nacionalno Radio Bulgarian National Radio

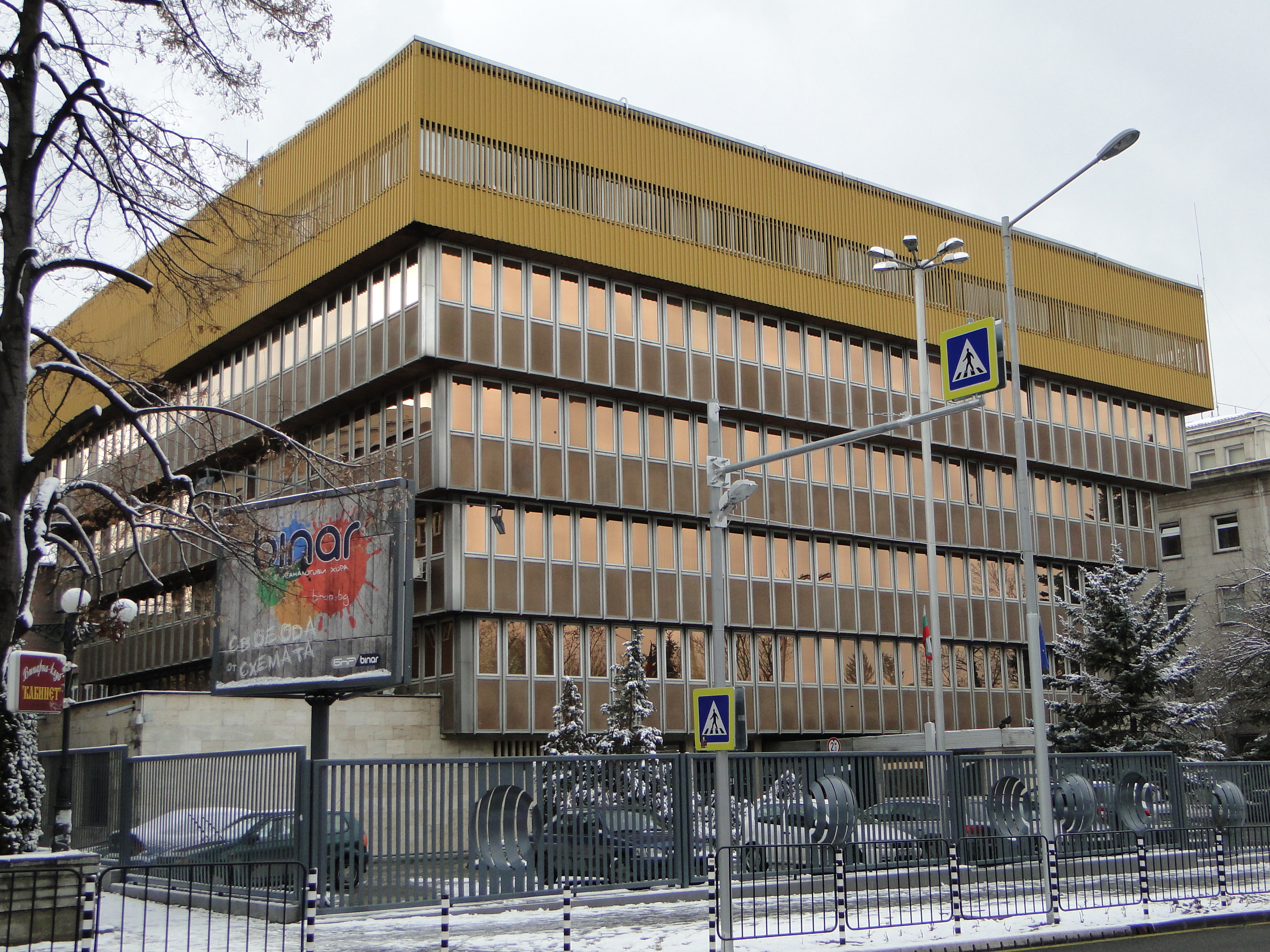
- Bulgarian National Radio headquarters in Sofia (2013)
- Type: Public-service sound broadcasting
- Country: Bulgaria
- Broadcast area: National
- Headquarters: Sofia

Ownership
- Owner: Government of Bulgaria

History
- Launch date: 25 January 1935; 91 years ago

Coverage
- Stations: Horizont; Hristo Botev; Radio Bulgaria

Links
- Webcast: List of streams
- Website: Official website

Bulgarian National Radio (Bulgarian: Българско национално радио, Bǎlgarsko nacionalno radio; abbreviated to БНР, BNR) is Bulgaria's national radio broadcasting organisation. It operates two national channels (Horizont and Hristo Botev) and nine regional channels, as well as an international service (Radio Bulgaria) which broadcasts in 11 languages.

== History ==
=== Until World War II ===
Listening to radio broadcasts from other countries having become popular in Bulgaria by the late 1920s, a group of engineers and intellectuals founded Rodno Radio ("Native, or Homeland, Radio") on 30 March 1930 with the aim of providing Sofia with its own radio station. Broadcasting began in June of the same year. Rodno Radio was renamed Radio Sofija in 1934.

On 25 January 1935, Boris III of Bulgaria signed a Decree nationalising Rodno Radio and making all broadcasting in Bulgaria a state-organised activity. In early 1936, a new and more powerful medium-wave transmitter sited near Sofia was joined by additional transmitting stations at Stara Zagora and Varna, giving Bulgarian National Radio countrywide coverage, and on 21 May of that year Radio Sofija began broadcasting internationally.

=== Socialism ===
With the help of Soviet spare parts in 1946/1947, the first experimental transmissions of the so-called "Sofia II transmitter" were constructed by a technical brigade under the leadership of Eng. Georgi Nestorov.

On 18 January 1960, by order of the Minister of Education and Culture Nacho Papazov, instructions were given that all the activities of radio and television should be in the spirit of the decisions of the congresses and plenums of the Communist Party. This marked the beginning of Bulgarian Radio in its modern form, including a common system of national, regional and foreign programmes.

Since 4 January 1971, the first station of Bulgarian Radio has been called "Horizont". The new programme was information and music and borrowed from the format of Radio France Inter. The second national station was "Hristo Botev" (named after the Bulgarian revolutionary and poet) and the third station was "Orpheus". The new literary and musical programme sought to introduce its listeners to the more complex aesthetic expressions and concerns in art. On 28 May 1971, the Orpheus programme was broadcast stereophonically for the first time in Bulgaria. In 1972, the new building of the Bulgarian Radio in Sofia, at 4 Dragan Tsankov Boulevard, was opened.

In the 1980s, for the first time the programmes "Before Everyone", "Good Day", "Sunday 150", "People, Roads, Cars", "Sport and Music", which became emblematic of the Bulgarian National Radio, went on air.

=== Development after 1989 ===
For the first time on 11 November 1989, Petko Georgiev gave the national address "Ladies and gentlemen, good day". In December 1992, due to budget cuts, the Orpheus station (which, since 1977, was broadcasting knowledge programmes daily from 10:00 to 12:00 and from 14:00 to 16:00) was closed down and some of their programmes were transferred to Hristo Botev Radio.

With the merger of EBU and OIRT on 1 January 1993, BNR was admitted to full active membership of the European Broadcasting Union. In 1998, the regional programme "Efir Sofia", broadcasting from 13:05 to 14:00 on 68.05 MHz and 774 kHz in Sofia, was closed down.

On 6 February 2001, the regulatory body NSRT elected poet and translator Ivan Borislavov as the new Director General of BNR. The majority of the employees of the National Radio strongly opposed his election. Borislavov, interviewed by telephone, suffered a heart attack and was admitted to hospital. On 4 April, the Supreme Administrative Court (SAC) deemed the NSRT's decision of the election of Ivan Borislavov as illegal, and on 28 May, the NSRT elected Polya Stancheva by consensus as the new Director General of BNR. In 2004, a new election was held. In 2004, Polya Stancheva was elected for a second term as Director General of the broadcaster.

On 1 March 2009, after a long prepared start, the next regional program of BNR – Radio Vidin started broadcasting. The license of the radio, issued by the CEM, is for a program serving the population of the districts of Vidin, Vratsa and Montana.

From 2013 to 2015, Radoslav Yankulov was the Director General of BNR. From 2016 to 2019, the Director General of BNR was Alexander Velev.

== Domestic channels ==
Radio Bulgaria provides news in Bulgarian and also in Albanian, Romanian, English, French, German, Greek, Russian, Spanish, Serbian and Turkish.

BNR operates the following stations:

=== National ===
- Horizont: BNR's most listened-to channel, with round-the-clock news, comment, and music (with the emphasis on modern popular music genres).
- Hristo Botev Radio: covering science and the arts, documentaries and discussions on cultural and social questions, drama, classical music, jazz, and programming for children.

=== Regional ===
- Radio Blagoevgrad (1973–)
- Radio Burgas (2012–)
- Radio Kardzhali (2016–)
- Radio Plovdiv (1955–)
- Radio Shumen (1973–)
- Radio Sofia (1962–1998, 2007–)
- Radio Stara Zagora (1936–)
- Radio Varna (1934–)
- Radio Vidin (2009–)

== Organization ==
=== Transmission ===
The domestic channels are broadcast on FM and AM frequencies. Radio Bulgaria broadcasts principally on shortwave plus one medium-wave frequency. All stations are also available online.

On 26 May 2008, RPTS of Kostinbrod in Bulgaria started the country's first regular broadcasts in digital format, using Digital Radio Mondiale (DRM). This signal is also used as the audio channel accompanying BNT's testcard.

=== Funding ===
Public service broadcasting in Bulgaria, including BNR, is financed mainly through a state subsidy. The subsidy has to be spent on the preparation, creation and the transmission of the national and regional programmes. Its volume is determined annually on the basis of the average programme production costs per hour approved by the Council of Ministers, regardless of the programme type.

== See also ==
- Bulgarian National Radio Symphony Orchestra
- Bulgarian National Television

== Sources ==
- Todorov, Aleksandar B. (2010). "The Broadcasting System in Bulgaria at the End of the Analogue Age: An Economic Perspective" (PDF). Working Papers of the Institute for Broadcasting Economics at the University of Cologne (261). Germany.
