= Dryanovo (river) =

River in Bulgaria

Dryanovska reka
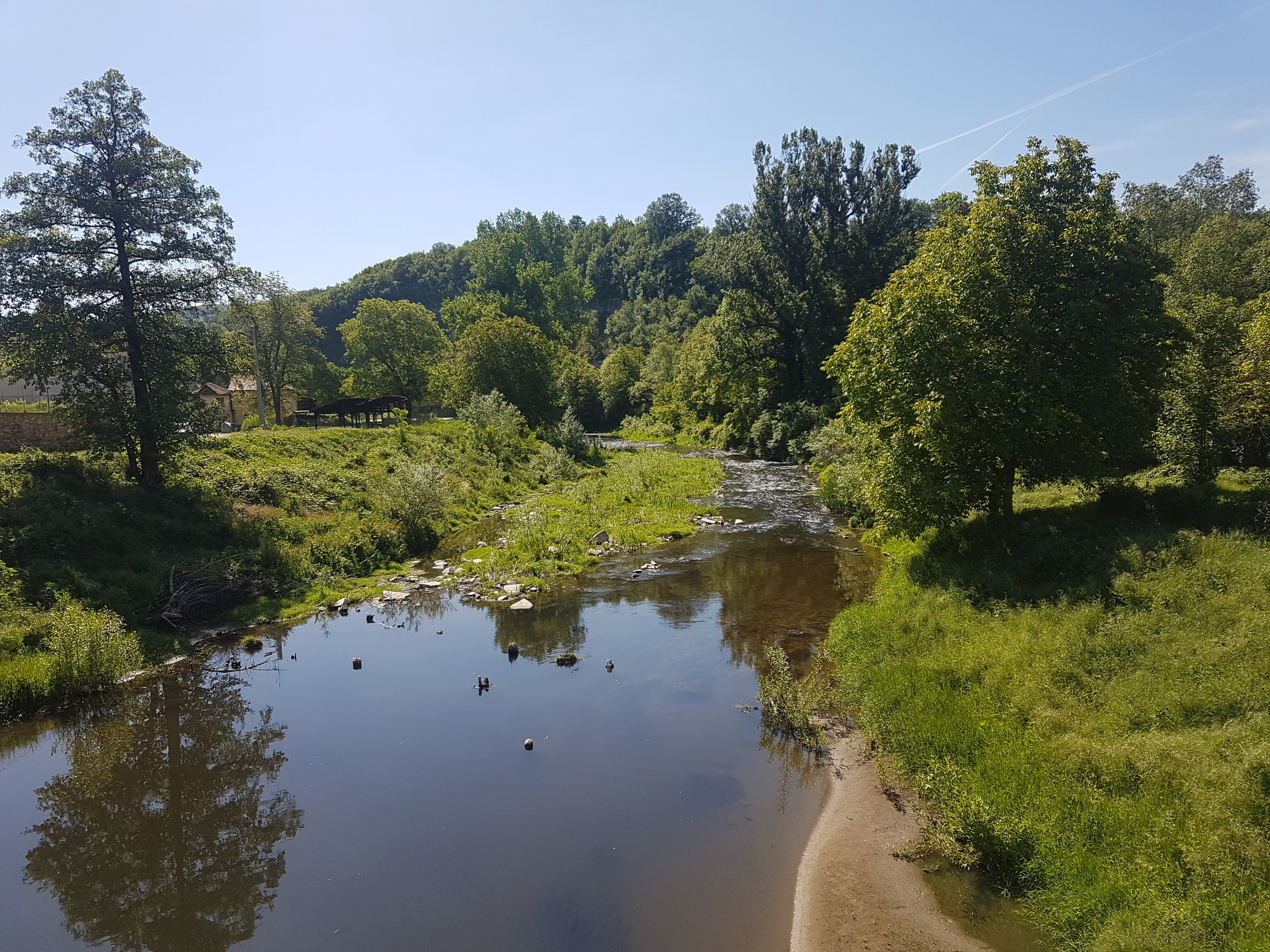

Location
- Country: Bulgaria

Physical characteristics
- Source
  - location: SW of Kamenarkata, Balkan Mountains
  - coordinates: 42°46′5.16″N 25°31′49.08″E
  - elevation: 980 m (3,220 ft)
- Mouth
  - location: Belitsa
  - coordinates: 43°2′53.88″N 25°36′32.04″E
  - elevation: 144 m (472 ft)
- Length: 59 km (37 mi)
- Basin size: 554 km^{2} (214 sq mi)

Basin features
- Progression: Belitsa→ Yantra→ Danube→ Black Sea

The Dryanovo or Dryanovska reka (Bulgarian: Дряновска река) is a 59 km-long river in northern Bulgaria, a left tributary of the Belitsa, itself a right tributary of the river Yantra of the Danube basin. It is the largest tributary of the Belitsa.

== Geography ==
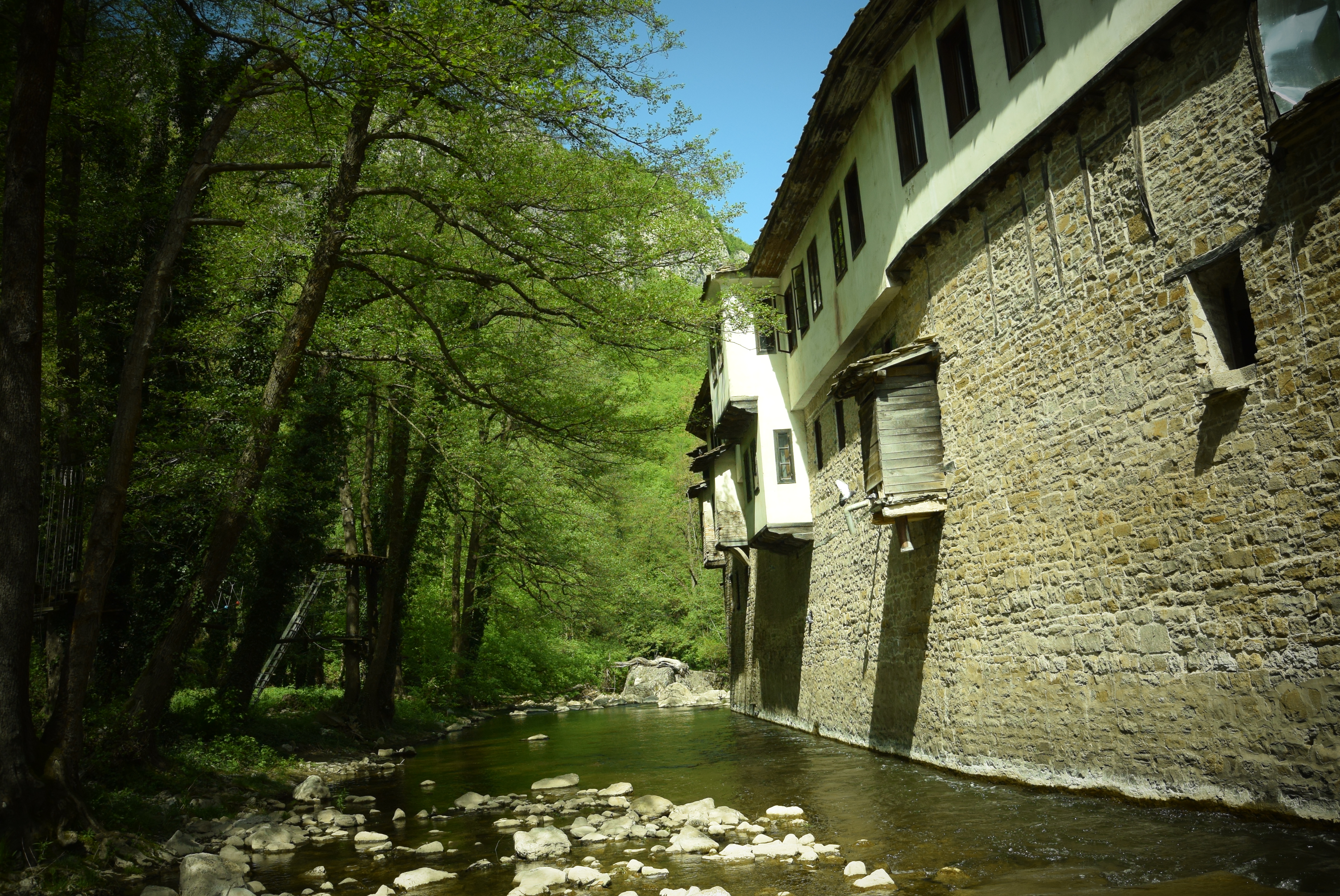
The river at Dryanovo Monastery

The Dryanovska reka takes its source under the name Plachkovska reka at an altitude of 980 m on the southwestern foothills of the summit of Kamenakata (1,072 m) in the Dryanovska Planina division of the Balkan Mountains, within the boundaries of the Bulgarka Nature Park. It flows north–northwest in a deep forested valley until the town of Plachkovtsi, where it receives two small tributaries. Its valley widens between Plachkovtsi in the town of Tryavna, and then narrows again with steep forested slopes.

The valley widens between the villages of Durcha and Tsareva Livada, and then enters a deep gorge in the eastern part of the Strazhata Plateau, where the Dryanovo Monastery is situated. After exiting the gorge the river turns northeast. Downstream of the town of Dryanovo its valley widens again and the Dryanovska reka flows into the Belitsa at an altitude of 144 m west of the town of Debelets.

Its drainage basin covers a territory of 336 km^{2} or 45.4% of the Belitsa's total.

The Dryanovska has rain–snow feed with high water in March–June and low water in July–October. The average annual discharge at the village of Tsareva Livada is 2.06 m^{3}/s.

== Settlements and transportation ==
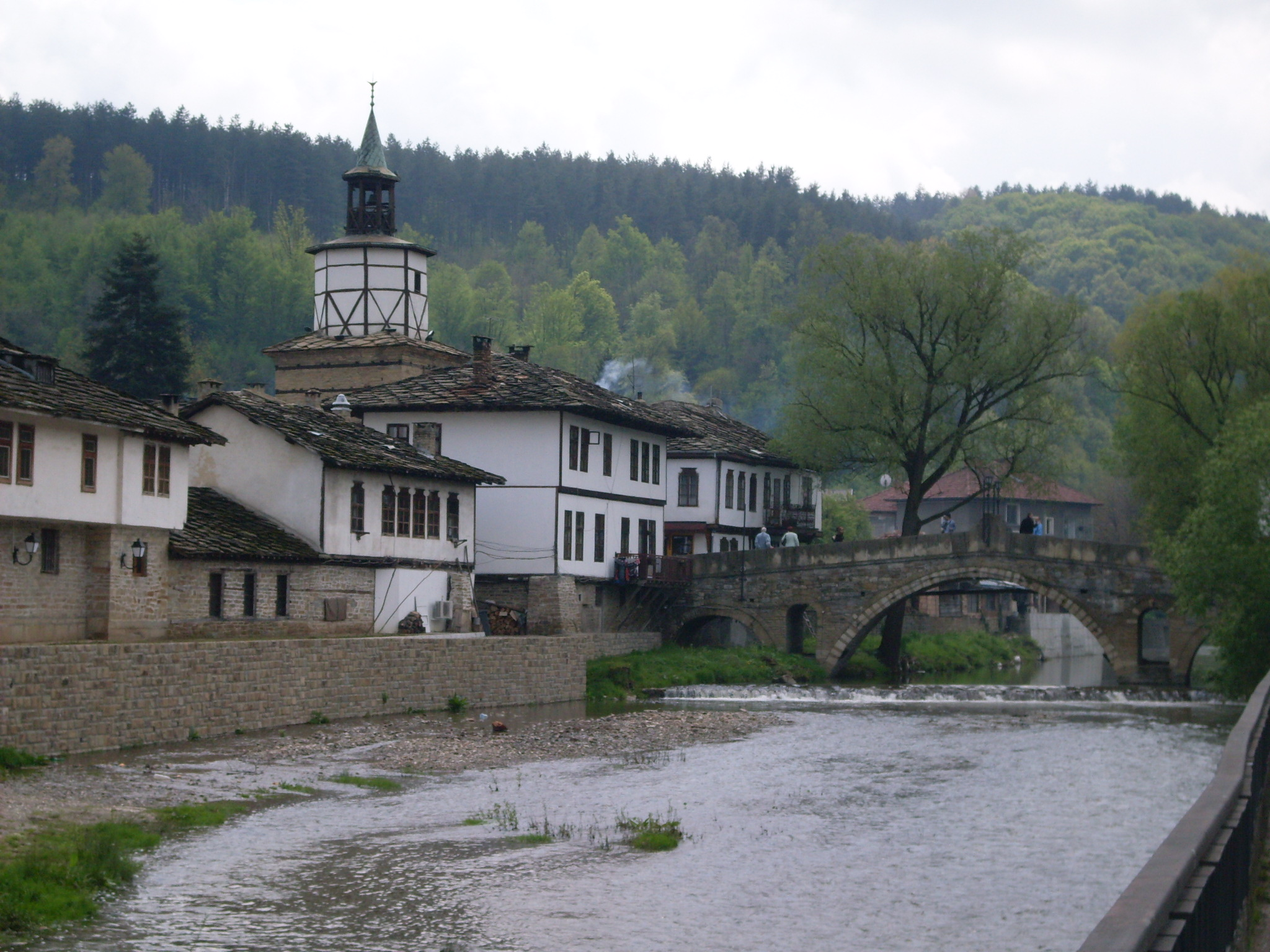
The river at Tryavna

The river flows in Gabrovo and Veliko Tarnovo Provinces. There are four towns and eight villages along its course: Radevtsi, Plachkovtsi (town), Azmanite, Tryavna (town) and Staynovtsi in Tryavna Municipality, Durcha, Tsavera Livada, Dryanovo (town), Ganchovets, Salasuka and Sokolovo in Dryanovo Municipality, all of them in Gabrovo Province, as well as the town of Debelets in Veliko Tarnovo Municipality of Veliko Tarnovo Province. Its waters are utilized for irrigation.

In the picturesque gorge between Tsareva Livada and Dryanovo is located the Dryanovo Monastery of St. Archangel Michael, founded in the 12th century during the Second Bulgarian Empire, which was one the centers of preparation of the April Uprising of 1876. On the vertical limestone slopes of the gorge is the entrance of the Bacho Kiro cave, known for its numerous speleological formations, as well as for containing some of the earliest human remains in Bulgaria. The towns of Dryanovo and Tryavna have well-preserved Bulgarian National Revival architecture. All these landmarks are included in the 100 Tourist Sites of Bulgaria.

There are two roads along its course: an 18.4 km stretch of the first class I-5 road Ruse–Stara Zagora–Makaza follows the river between Debelets and Dryanovo and a 20.8 km section of the third class III-609 road Dabovo–Tryavna–Dryanovo follows its valley between Radevtsi and Tsareva Livada. Through most of its valley runs a section of railway line No. 4 Ruse–Stara Zagora–Podkova of the Bulgarian State Railways.

== Gallery ==
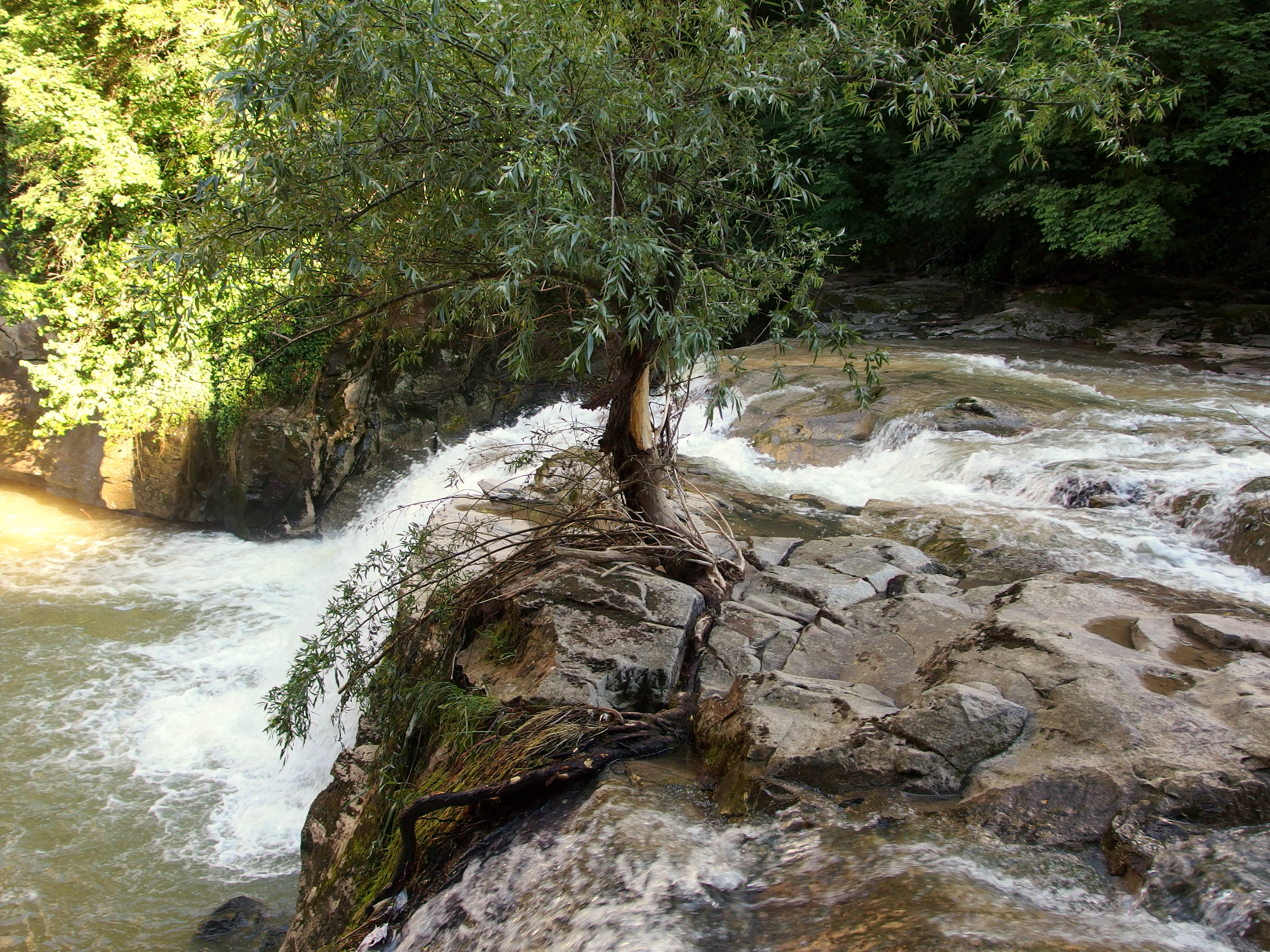
The river in the gorge near Dryanovo Monastery

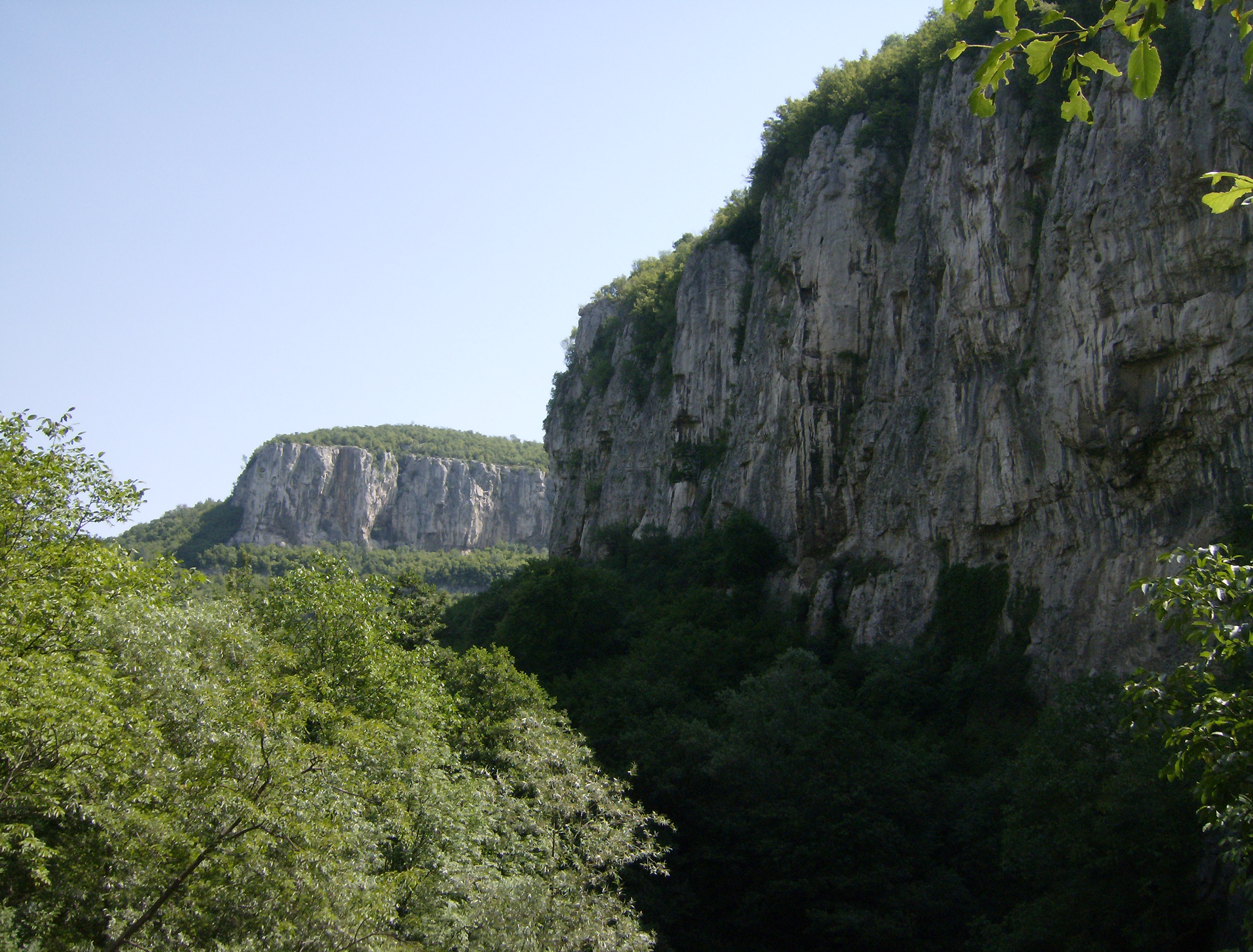
The river gorge near Bacho Kiro Cave

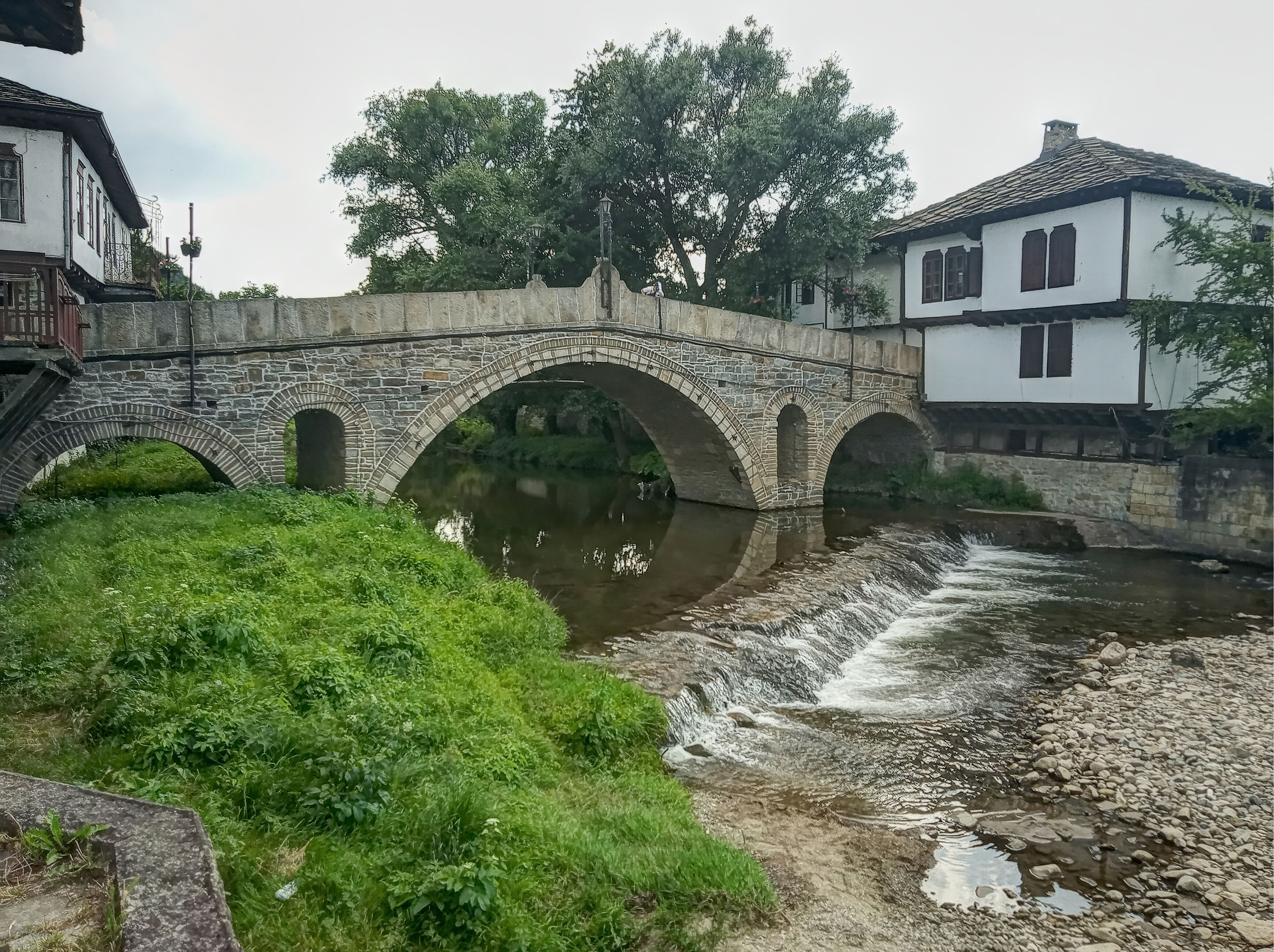
A stone bridge over the river in Tryavna

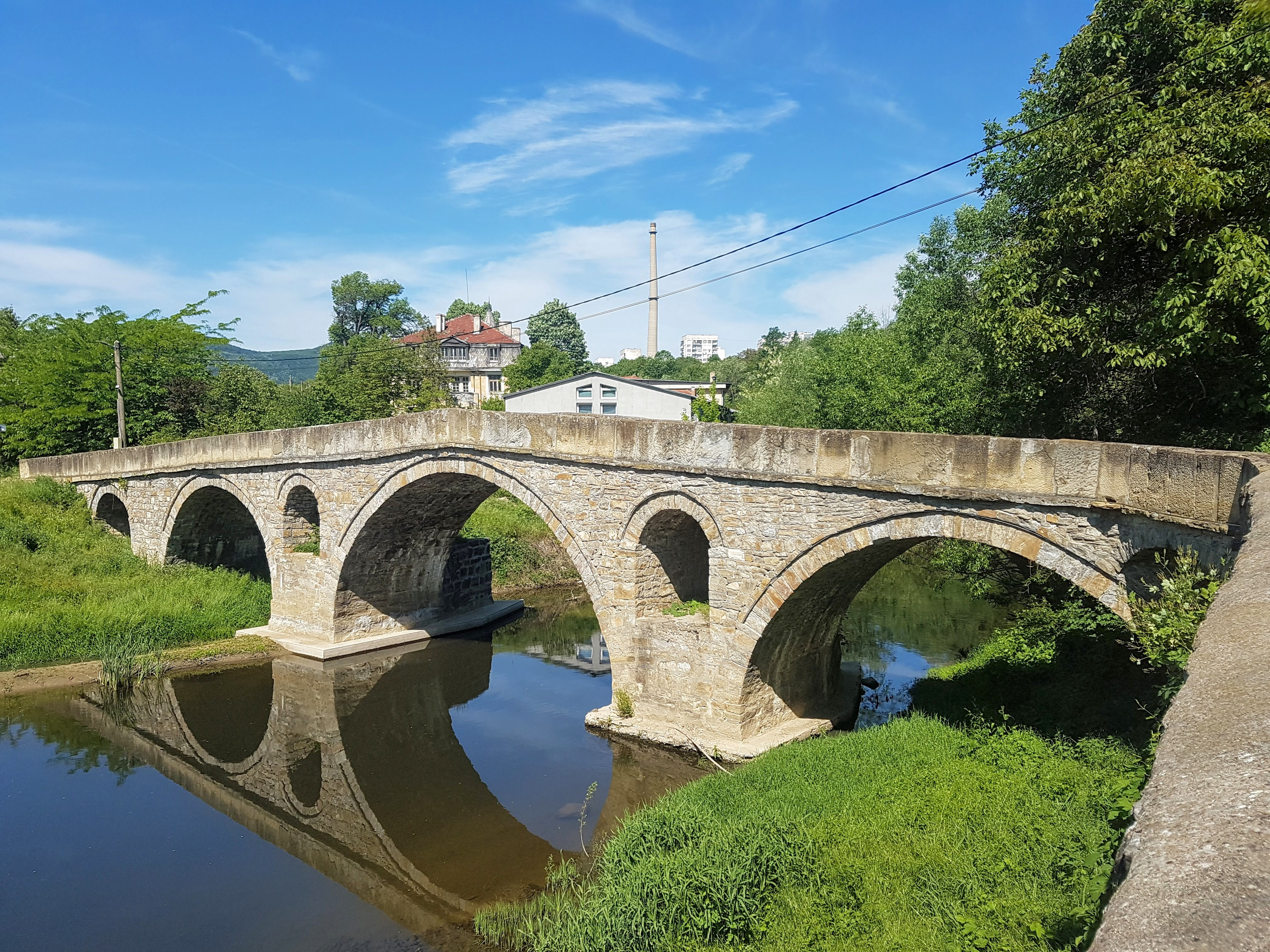
A stone bridge over the river in Dryanovo
