= Belitsa (Yantra) =

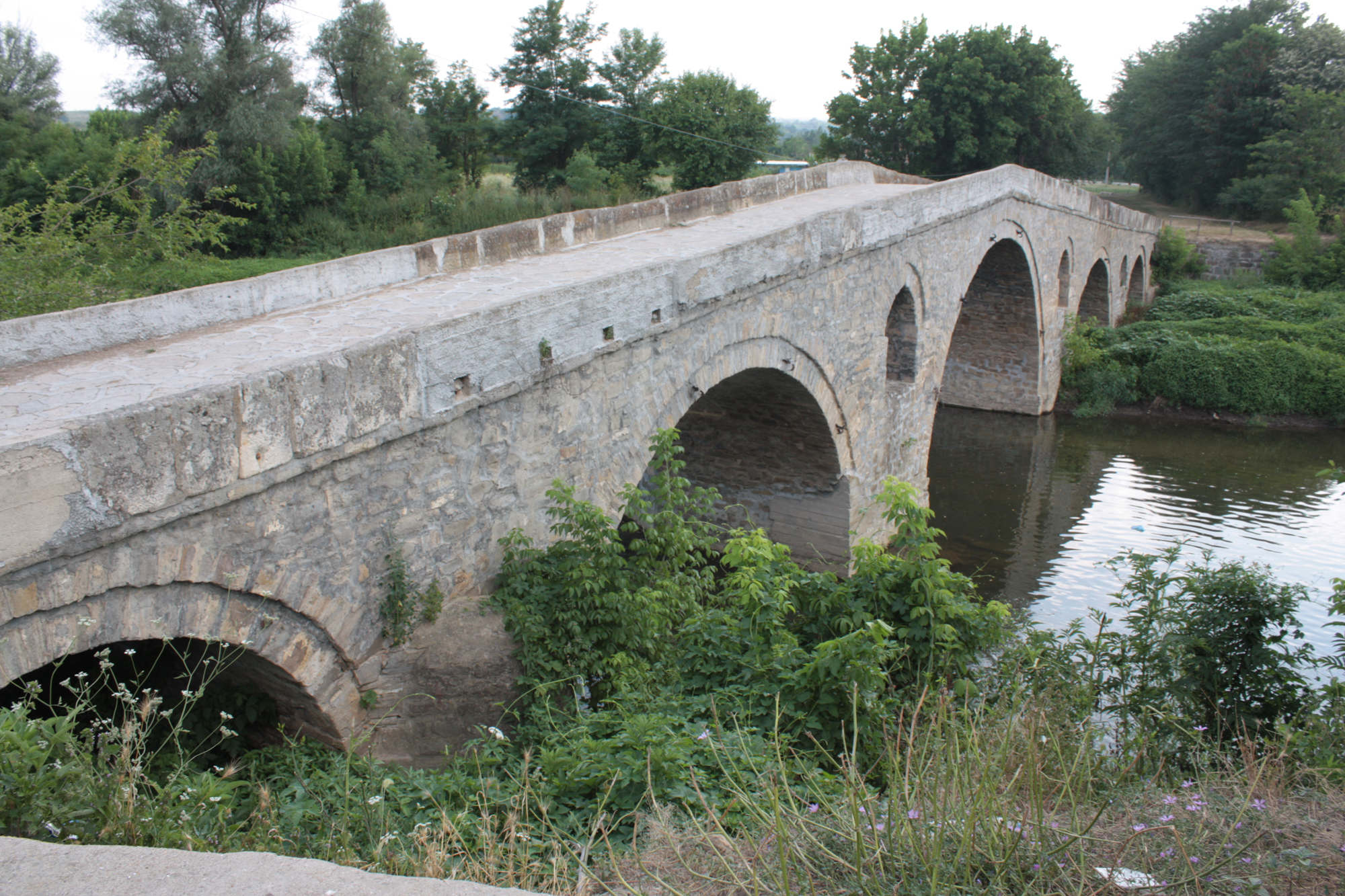
- A bridge over the Belitsa at Debelets

Location
- Country: Bulgaria

Physical characteristics
- Source
  - location: SW of Varbanov Chukar, Balkan Mountains
  - coordinates: 42°47′17.16″N 25°36′16.92″E
  - elevation: 718 m (2,356 ft)
- Mouth
  - location: Yantra
  - coordinates: 43°3′33.84″N 25°35′57.12″E
  - elevation: 142 m (466 ft)
- Length: 57 km (35 mi)
- Basin size: 740 km^{2} (290 sq mi)

Basin features
- Progression: Yantra→ Danube→ Black Sea

The Belitsa (Bulgarian: Белица) is a 57 km-long river in northern Bulgaria, a right tributary of the river Yantra, itself a right tributary of the Danube.

The Belitsa takes its source under the name Stanchovhanska reka at an altitude of 718 m, on the southwestern foothills of the summit of Varbanov Chukar (829 m) in the Tryavna division of the Balkan Mountains. It flows northwest in a narrow forested valley until the village of Stanchov Han. The river then gradually turns north, northeast and east, and its valley widens. Downstream of the village of Kisyovtsi the Belitsa flows northwards. Downstream of Voneshta Voda it forms a gorge between the Gabrovo Heights to the west and the Elena Heights to the east. At the town of Debelets the river receives its largest tributary the Dryanovska reka and in 2 km flows into the Yantra at an altitude of 142 m in the Cholakovtsi neighbourhood of the city of Veliko Tarnovo.

Its drainage basin covers a territory of 740 km^{2} or 9.4% of the Yantra's total. Its largest tributary is the Dryanovska reka.

High water is in April–June and low water is in August–October. The average annual discharge at the village of Vaglevtsi is 2.2 m^{3}/s.

The river flows in Gabrovo Province and Veliko Tarnovo Provinces. There are 11 settlements along its course, three towns and eight villages: Gaydari, Stanchov Han and Belitsa in Tryavna Municipality of Gabrovo Province, and Kisyovtsi, Voneshta Voda, Vaglevtsi, Samsiite, Natsovtsi, Kilifarevo (town), Debelets (town) and Veliko Tarnovo (city) in Veliko Tarnovo Municipality of Veliko Tarnovo Province. Its waters are utilized for irrigation. There are two main roads along its valley, a 22 km stretch of the second class II-55 road Debelets–Nova Zagora–Svilengrad follows the Belitsa between Debelets and Voneshta Voda, and a 10 km section of the third class III-552 road Belitsa–Tryavna–Gabrovo follows the river between Voneshta Voda and Belitsa.
