= Geography of Veliko Tarnovo =

Veliko Tarnovo is located in Central Northern Bulgaria, in the central pre-Balkan and in the catchment area of the Yantra River.

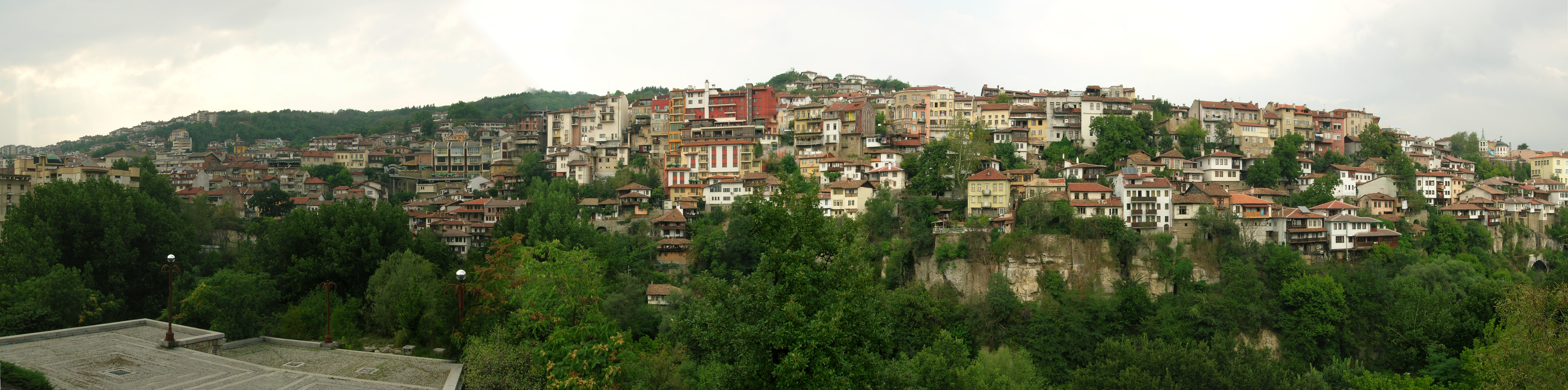
The town near the meanders of the Yantra River

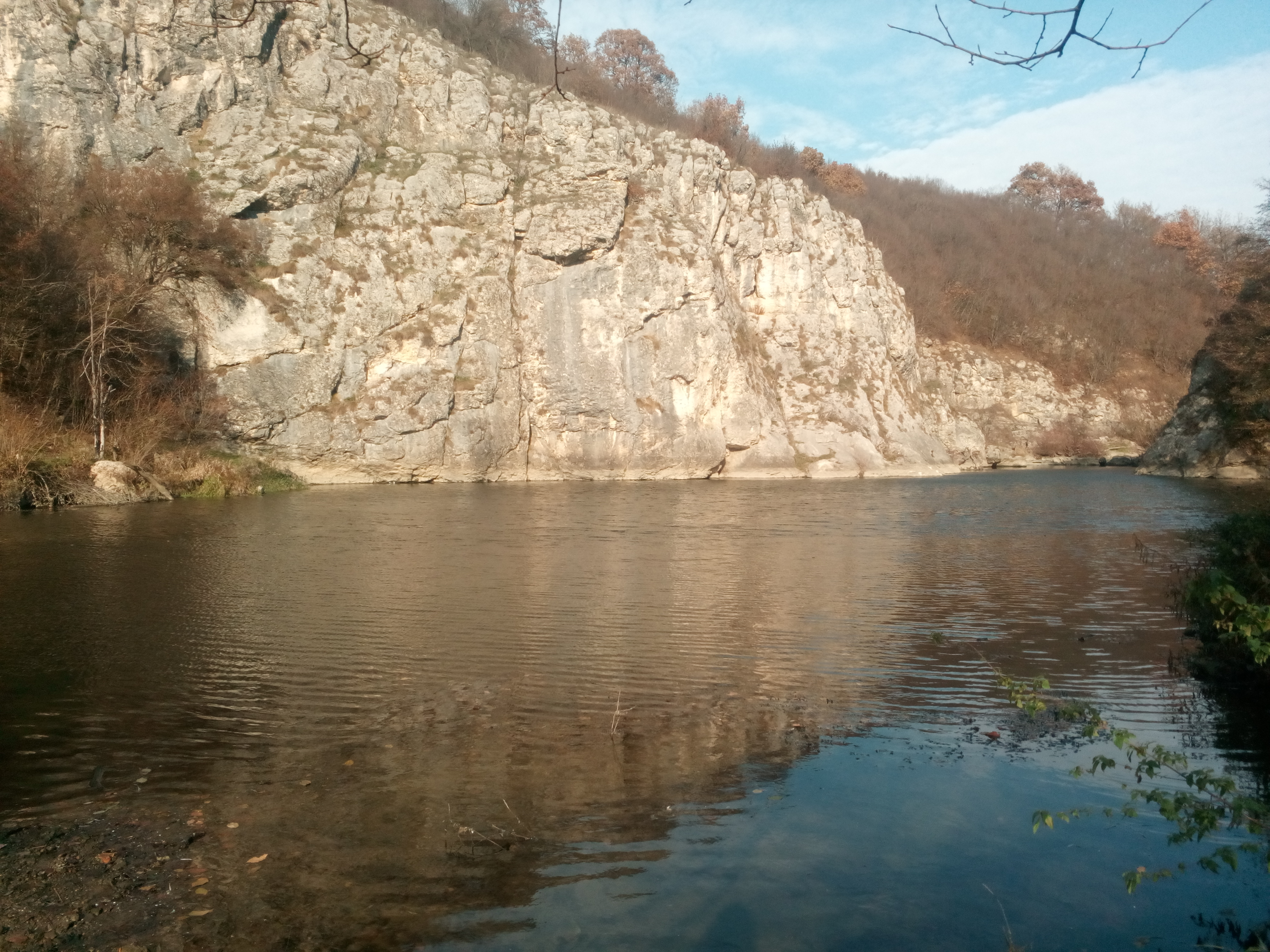
Sini Vir reservoir, west-southwest of Veliko Tarnovo

== Location ==
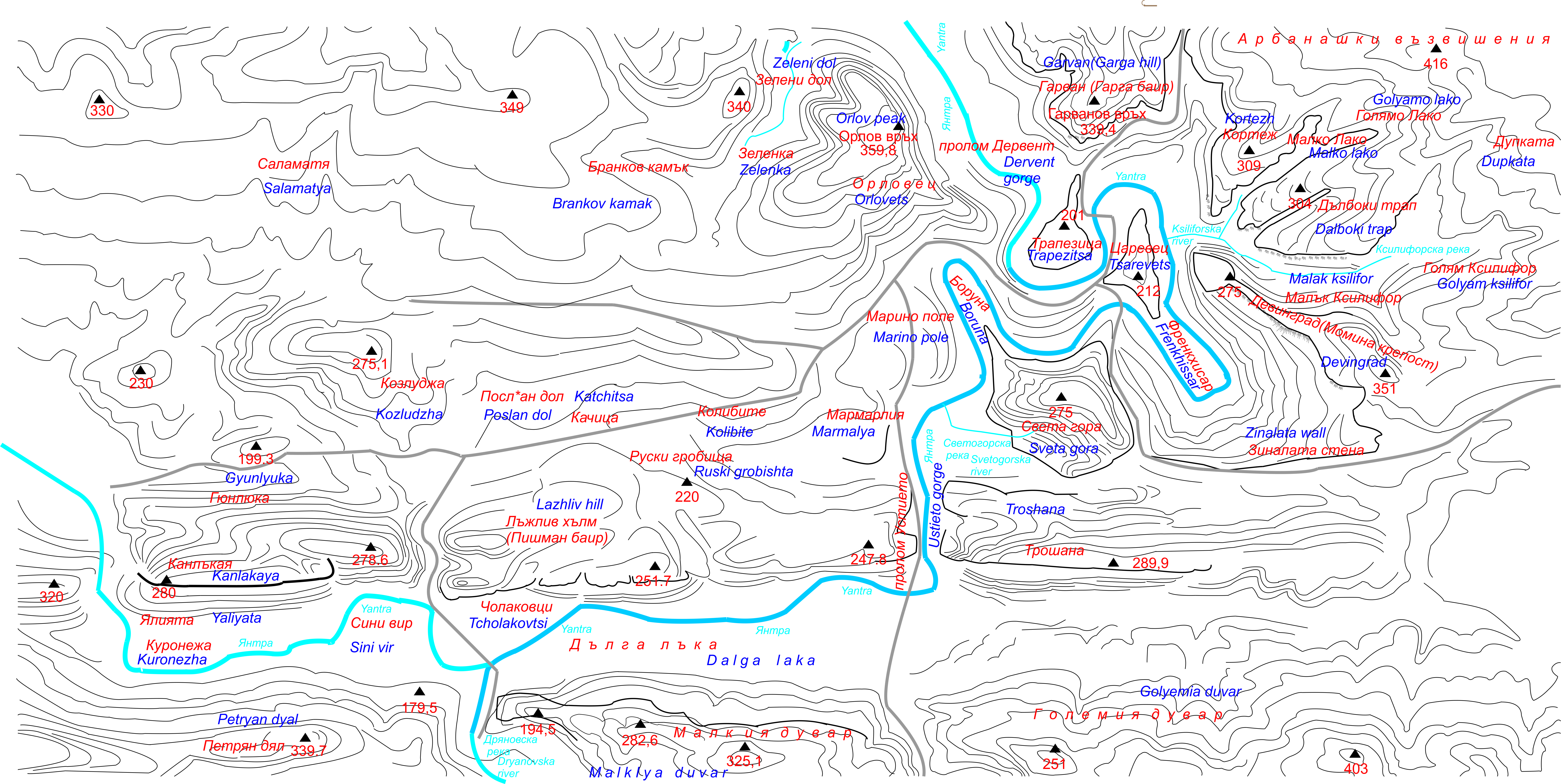
Veliko Tarnovo`s localities

The main roads pass through the town, connecting the Western Balkans with the Black Sea and Central Europe with the Middle East.

== Urban area ==
The town is an urban center and forms a metropolitan area with the sedentary town of Debelets, the villages of Ledenik, Belyakovets, Shemshevo, Prisovo and the suburban areas of Kozlodzha, Dervent.

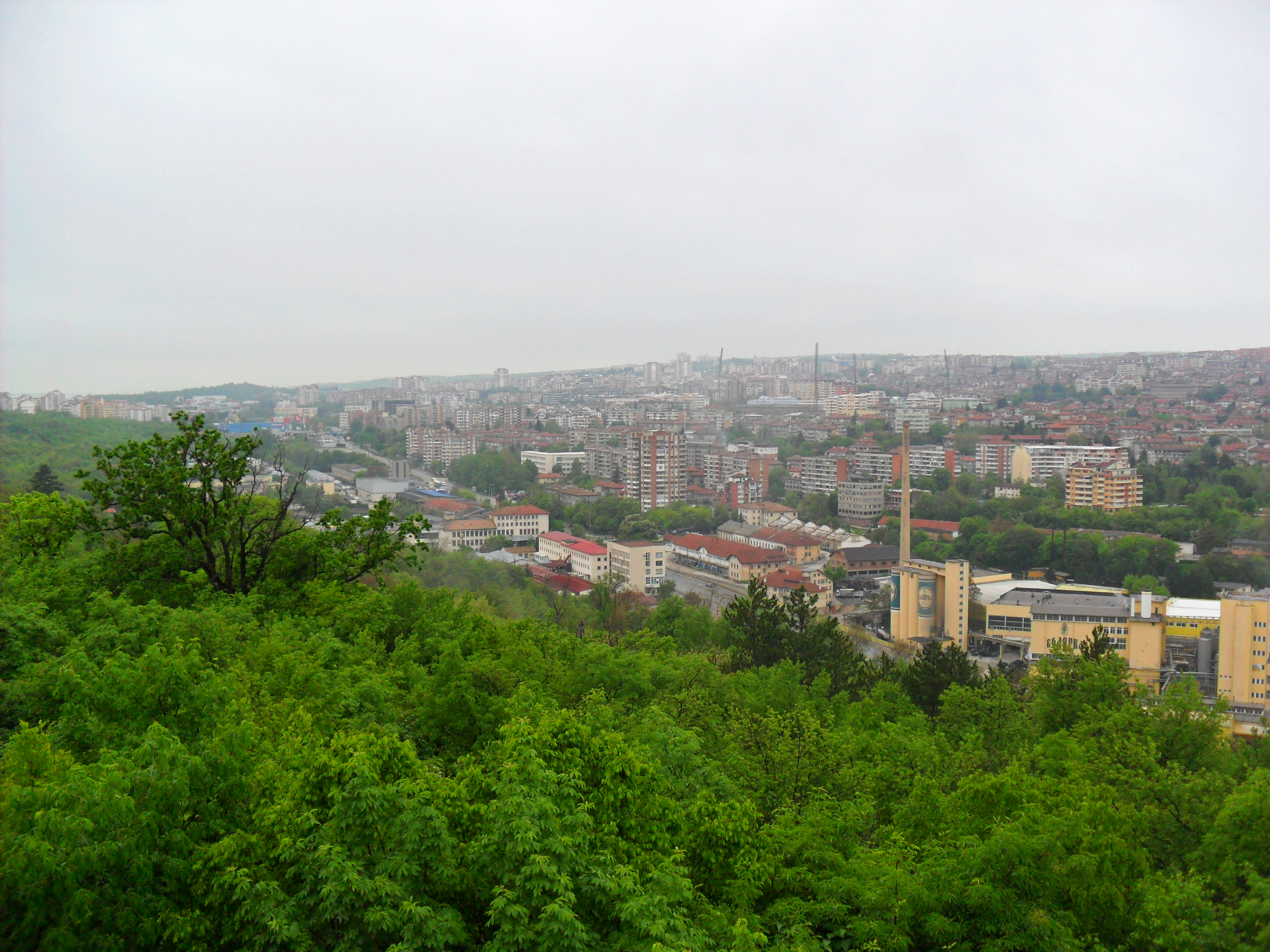

== Relief ==
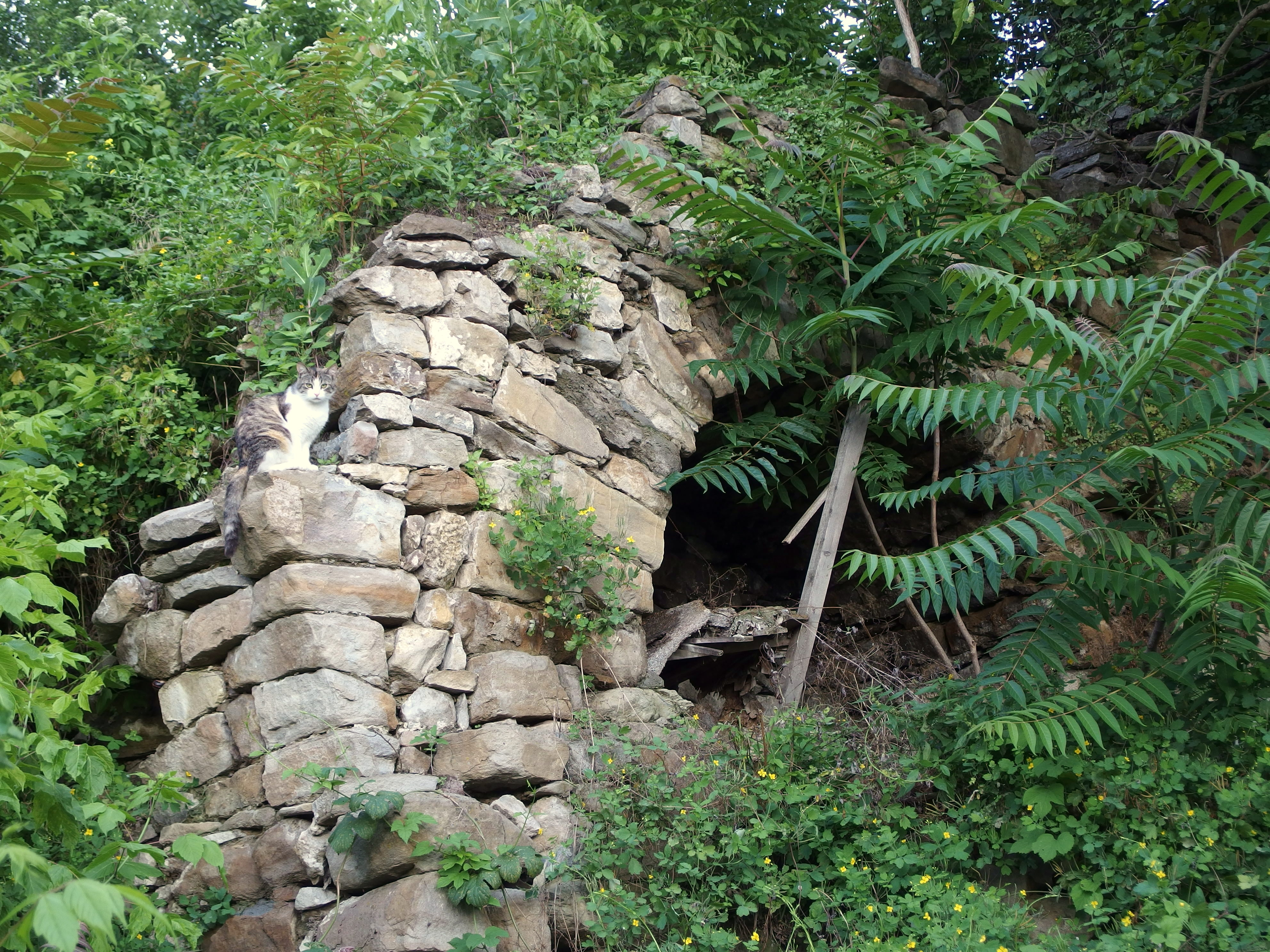

The relief of the city is highly have a medium degree of roughness (RR from 5 to 40‰). To the east, the town is surrounded by the Tarnovo Heights, to the west by Kalakaya and Salamatya, to the south by the Debeli Bair, the Big and Small Duvar, Patryal Dyal, to the north by Orlovets and Kartala. The average altitude is 220 meters. Highest points: Garga Bair (373 m.), Kartala (359 m.), The Small Duvar (351 m.), Patryl share (350 m.). There are three caves over 5 meters deep around the city – two in the Tarnovo Heights and some of the Kartala.

== Geology ==
The geological structure is made up of: To the south, Coneyas – mastite (terrigenous-carbonate rocks), santon – mastrite (terrigeno-carbonate rocks), zenoman Middle Turon, Upper-Aryah Formation (marls and clay marls with interbeds of sandstones, sandstones), sand marbles, Krivnen Formation in places sandstone, Seshev Formation – siltstones and often glauconites.

== Rocks ==
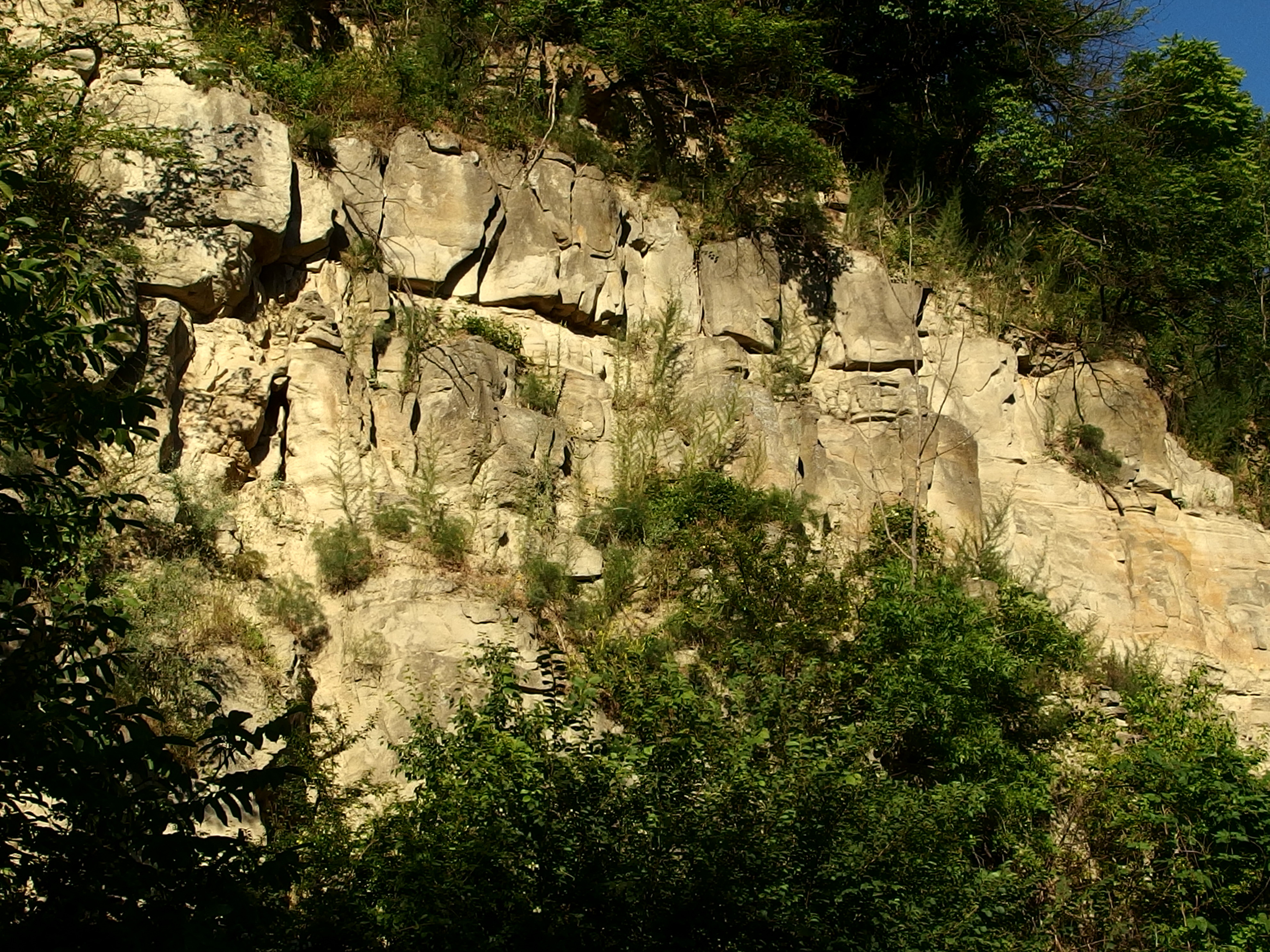

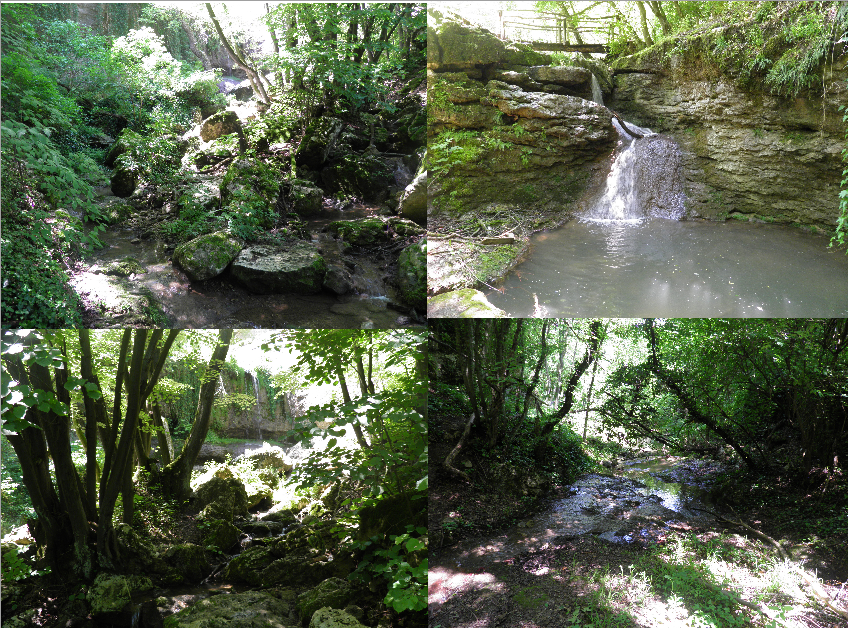
Waterfalls in Veliko Tarnovo area

The most rock formations in the city are in the Monsonsites: Garga Bair, Kartala, and other parts of the Tarnovo Hills. The rocks most often are: granite, limestone, montmorillonite (bentonite) clay rocks.

== Climate ==
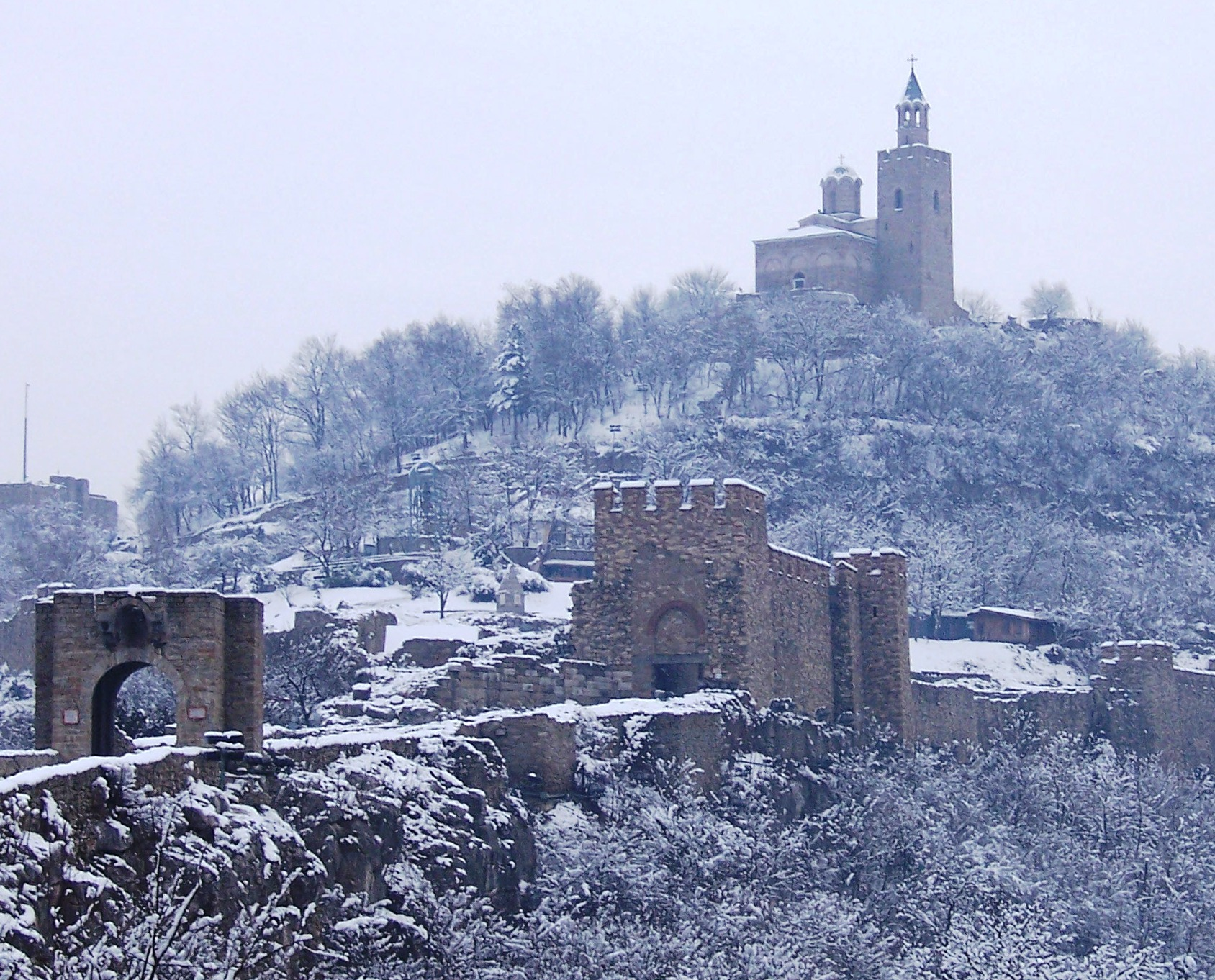

The climate is temperate continental – summer temperatures average – 21.8 °C and absolute maximum 41.1 °C / and average January temperature −0.6 °C and absolute minimum – 28.1 °C /. The western, northwest and northeast winds oriented along river valleys predominate. The average wind speed is about 1.3 m / s. The average annual rainfall is 680 mm. Snow cover is an average of 60 days a year. The average humidity is 49%. The lowest average annual temperature is in 1991 – 9.34 degrees Celsius, and the highest in 2002 is 11.73 degrees Celsius. Most precipitation is 2005. – 1,056.0 mm. and at least 1985 – 531.6 mm.

== Water ==
The large Yantra River passes through the city. A kilometer south to the city, at the town of Debelets, the Dryanovo River flows into the Belitsa River (from the basin of the Yantra).

There are also several small rivers: the Orlova River (in Kartala area), the Svetogorska River and the Ksiliforska River. Near the city are Lake Sveta Gora and Lake Xilifore. There are over 50 reservoirs in the city and around it. The main drinking source is the Yovkovtsi hydroelectric unit.

== Soils ==
The chernozem is located in the historical and flat part of the city (Asenov, Varusha, Marino pole, Cholakovtsi, Acacia). Gray forests prevail in the Tarnovo Heights, Kartala and Buzludzha. Alluvial-meadow soils are remembered at the mouths of the Yantra and Dryanovsk rivers.
