= Darvari =

Darvari may refer to:

- Dârvari, Romania
- Darvari, Bulgaria
