= Velentsi =

- Village
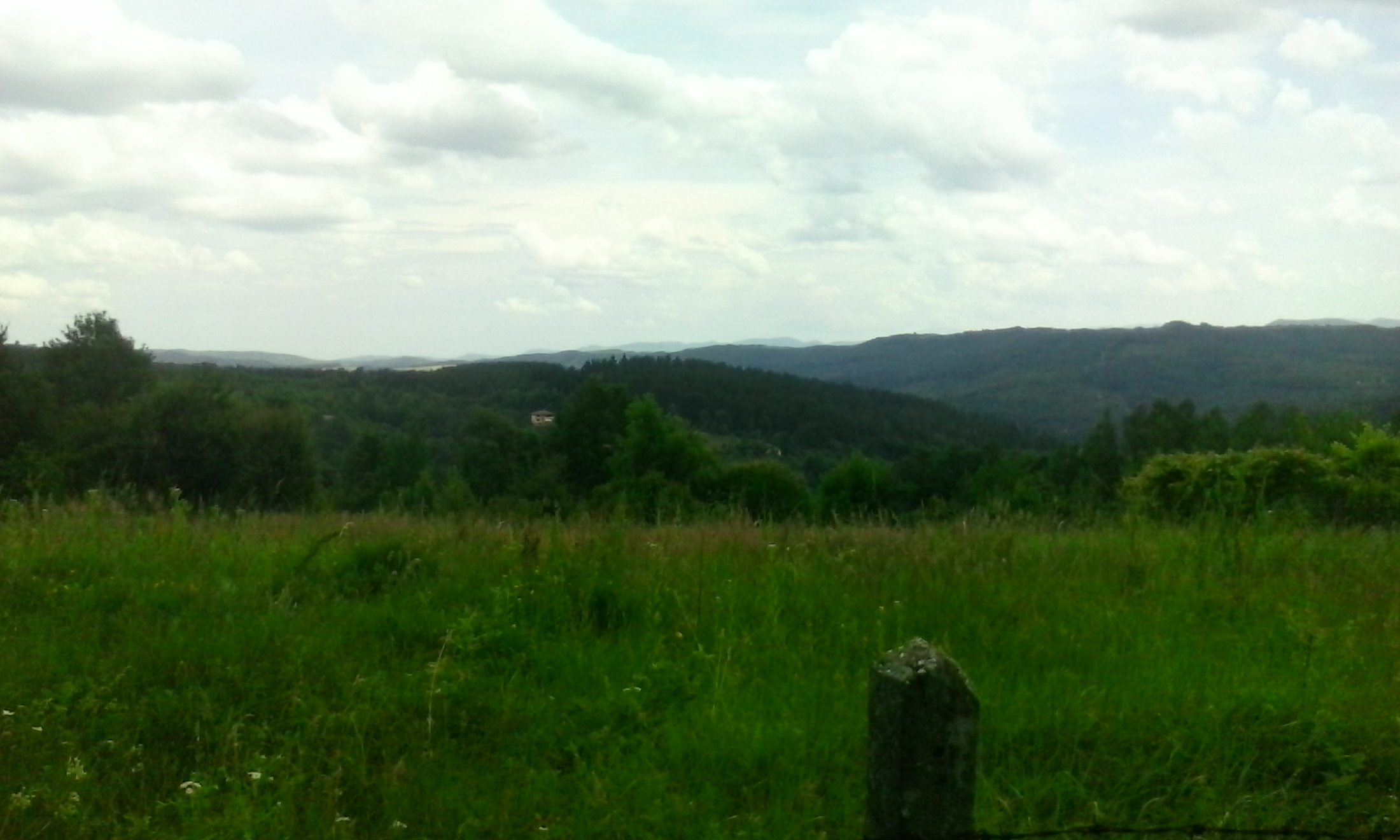
- Velentsi - panorama of the mountain

- Location within Bulgaria
- Coordinates: 42°53′N 25°28′E
- Country: Bulgaria
- Province: Gabrovo Province
- Municipality: Tryavna
- Time zone: UTC+2 (EET)
  - Summer (DST): UTC+3 (EEST)

Velentsi is a village in Tryavna Municipality, in Gabrovo Province, in northern central Bulgaria.
