= Dobrevtsi =

Dobrevtsi may refer to the following places in Bulgaria:

- Dobrevtsi, Gabrovo Province
- Dobrevtsi, Lovech Province
- Dobrevtsi, Veliko Tarnovo Province
