= Nikolaevo (disambiguation) =

Nikolaevo may refer to the following places in Bulgaria:

- Nikolaevo, town in Stara Zagora Province
- Nikolaevo, Gabrovo Province
- Nikolaevo, Pernik Province, see Radomir Municipality
- Nikolaevo, Sliven Province, see Gradsko, Bulgaria
- Nikolaevo, Veliko Tarnovo Province, see Strazhitsa Municipality
