= Milevtsi =

- Village
- Location within Bulgaria
- Coordinates: 42°51′N 25°31′E
- Country: Bulgaria
- Province: Gabrovo Province
- Municipality: Tryavna
- Time zone: UTC+2 (EET)
  - Summer (DST): UTC+3 (EEST)

Milevtsi is a village in Tryavna Municipality, in Gabrovo Province, in northern central Bulgaria. It is roughly 112 miles (180 kilometers) from the city of Sofia.
