= Hristovtsi, Gabrovo Province =

Hristovtsi
- Village
- Location in Bulgaria
- Coordinates: 42.882°N 25.525°E
- Country: Bulgaria
- Province: Gabrovo Province
- Municipality: Tryavna
- Time zone: UTC+2 (EET)
  - Summer (DST): UTC+3 (EEST)

Hristovtsi is a village in Tryavna Municipality, in Gabrovo Province, in northern central Bulgaria.
