= Sechen kamak =

- Village
- Location in Bulgaria
- Coordinates: 42°49′10″N 25°27′25″E
- Country: Bulgaria
- Province: Gabrovo Province
- Municipality: Tryavna
- Time zone: UTC+2 (EET)
  - Summer (DST): UTC+3 (EEST)

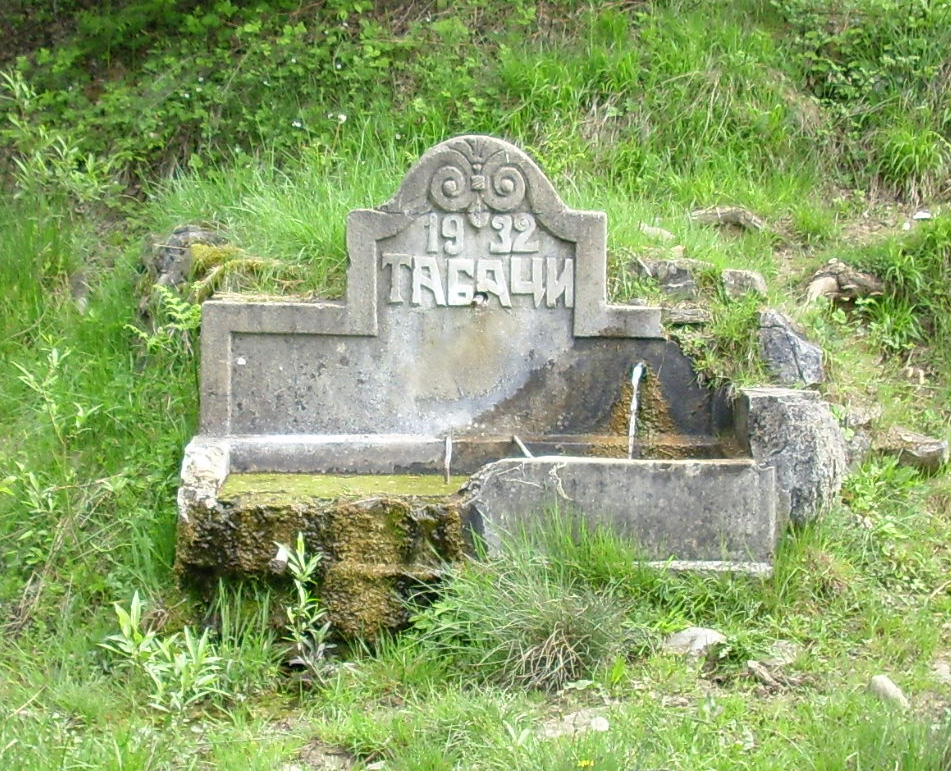
The fountain in Sechen Kamak, built in 1932. It bears an inscription with the village's old name – Tabatsi.

Sechen Kamak is a village in Tryavna Municipality, in Gabrovo Province, in northern central Bulgaria.
