= Yabulkovtsi =

- Village
- Location within Bulgaria
- Coordinates: 42°52′N 25°30′E
- Country: Bulgaria
- Province: Gabrovo Province
- Municipality: Tryavna
- Elevation: 633 m (2,077 ft)

Population (2018)
  - Total: 1
- Time zone: UTC+2 (EET)
  - Summer (DST): UTC+3 (EEST)

Yabulkovtsi is a mountain village in Tryavna Municipality, in Gabrovo Province, in northern central Bulgaria.
