= Kreslyuvtsi =

- Village
- Location within Bulgaria
- Coordinates: 42°48′N 25°32′E
- Country: Bulgaria
- Province: Gabrovo Province
- Municipality: Tryavna

Population (2022)
  - Total: 2
- Time zone: UTC+2 (EET)
  - Summer (DST): UTC+3 (EEST)
- Vehicle registration: EB

Kreslyuvtsi is a village in Tryavna Municipality, in Gabrovo Province, in northern central Bulgaria. Its population was 2 as of 2022.
