= Darvari, Bulgaria =

Darvari
- Village
- Location in Bulgaria
- Coordinates: 42.856°N 25.547°E
- Country: Bulgaria
- Province: Gabrovo Province
- Municipality: Tryavna
- Time zone: UTC+2 (EET)
  - Summer (DST): UTC+3 (EEST)

Darvari is a village in Tryavna Municipality, in Gabrovo Province, in northern central Bulgaria.
