= Podkova (village) =

Podkova Подкова
- Village
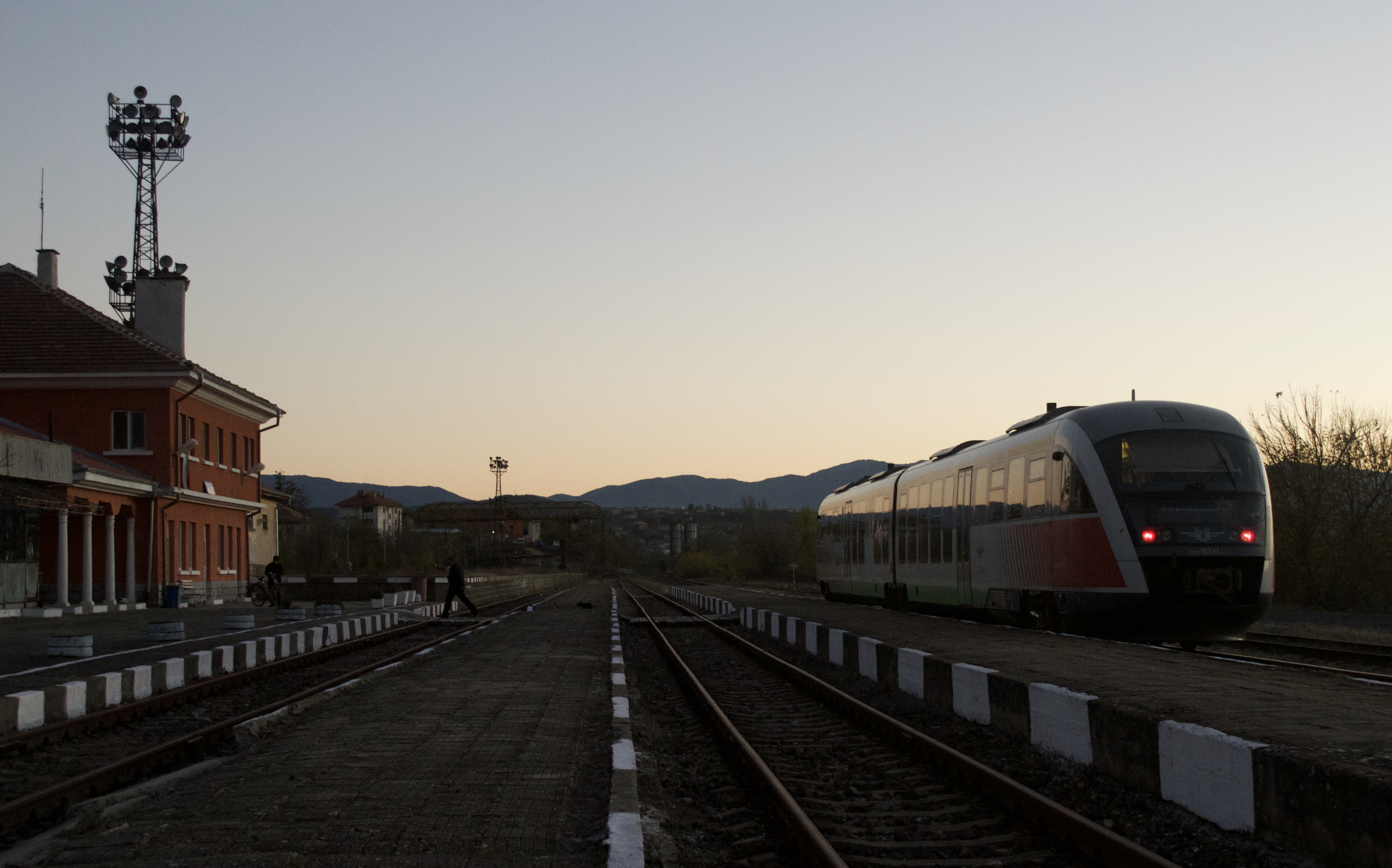
- Train line in Podkova

- Location within Bulgaria
- Coordinates: 41.3983°N 25.3986°E
- Country: Bulgaria
- Province: Kardzhali Province
- Municipality: Kirkovo
- Time zone: UTC+2 (EET)
  - Summer (DST): UTC+3 (EEST)

Podkova (Bulgarian: Подкова [potˈkɔva]) is a village in Kirkovo Municipality, Kardzhali Province, southern Bulgaria.
