= Staynovtsi =

- Village
- Location within Bulgaria
- Coordinates: 42°52′N 25°30′E
- Country: Bulgaria
- Province: Gabrovo Province
- Municipality: Tryavna
- Time zone: UTC+2 (EET)
  - Summer (DST): UTC+3 (EEST)

Staynovtsi is a village in Tryavna Municipality, in Gabrovo Province, in northern central Bulgaria.

The municipality’s population fell from about 14,391 in 2001 to around 8,674 in 2021 and continues to decline.
