= Plachkovtsi =

Plachkovtsi Плачковци
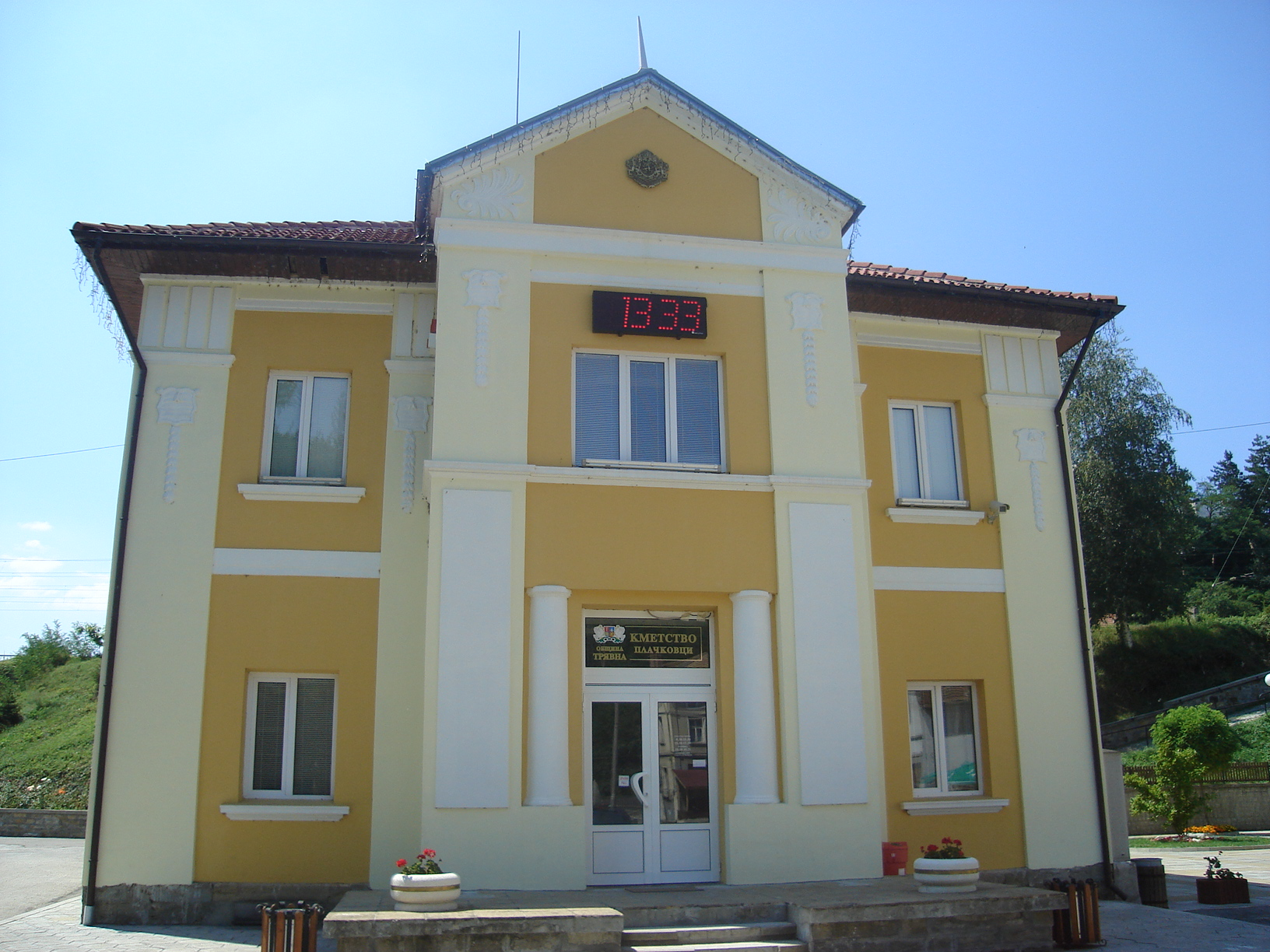
- Plachkovtsi town hall

- Location of Plachkovtsi
- Coordinates: 42°49′N 25°28′E
- Country: Bulgaria
- Province (Oblast): Gabrovo

Government
  - Mayor: Silvia Krasteva
- Elevation: 707 m (2,320 ft)

Population (15.06.2022)
  - Total: 1,457
- Time zone: UTC+2 (EET)
  - Summer (DST): UTC+3 (EEST)
- Postal Code: 5360
- Area code: 06770

Plachkovtsi (Bulgarian: Плачковци [ˈpɫat͡ʃkoft͡si]) is a town in central Bulgaria, part of Tryavna municipality, Gabrovo Province.

Plachkovtsi is located in a mountain area at the foot of the Tryavna Mountain. Elevation 510 m. At Plachkovtsi, the three rivers Stoevska Reka, Radevska Reka and Reka Potoche meet, giving the start of the Dryanovo_(river).

Plachkovtsi with its railway station on the Gorna Oryahovitsa - Stara Zagora line is an easily accessible starting point for a walk through the Tryavna Mountain, which is part of the Bulgarka_Nature_Park. The surrounding peaks are named Balgarka peak, Bedetsite (Great Bedek is 1488 m above sea level), Makhchenitsa (1042 m) and others. There are two natural protected areas - "Makhchenitsa-Yovovtsi" above the village of Yovovtsi and "Vikanata Skala" at the Balgarka peak above the Stoevtsi district.

== History ==
In 1190, in the vicinity of Plachkovtsi, Ivan_Asen_I defeated the army of Isaac II Angel in the so-called "Battle of the Tryavna Pass".

After the Liberation, the Plachkovtsi huts were first part of the Tryavna District and after its closure they passed to the Dryanovo District, Tarnovo District. The border with Eastern Rumelia runs along the ridge of the Balkan_Mountains. A part of the population, together with other Balkaners from the Elena, Gabrovo, Tryavna and Dryanovo regions, began to emigrate to the lowland parts of the newly liberated principality.

In 1921, in the neighborhood of Grubchevo in neighboring Radevtsi, the poet Ivan_Vazov spent the last summer of his life.

In 1961, Kolibi Plachkovtsi received the status of a village, and in 1969 - of a town, with Kancho Minchev as the mayor at that time.
