= Debelets =

Town in Bulgaria

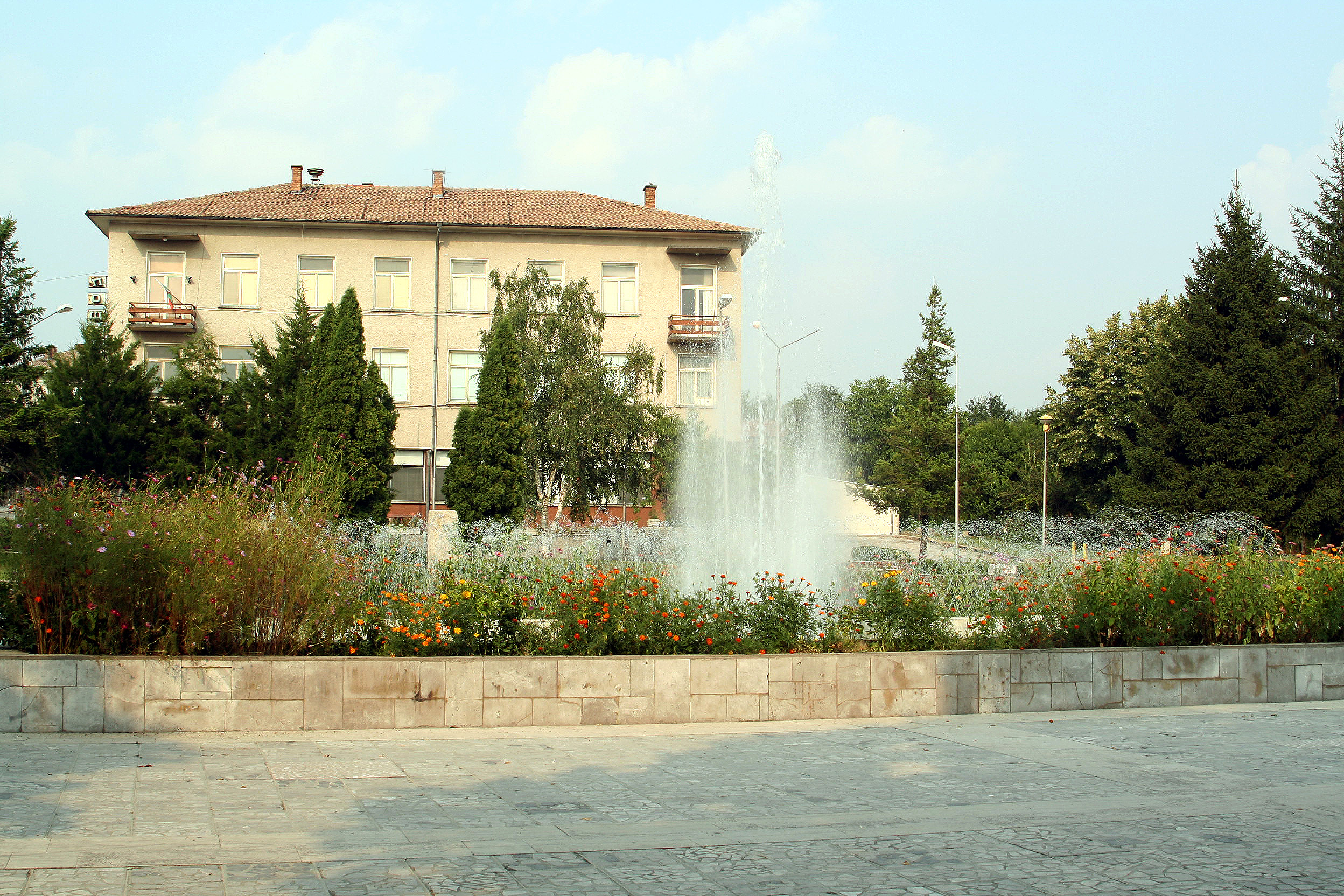
- The municipal building in Debelets

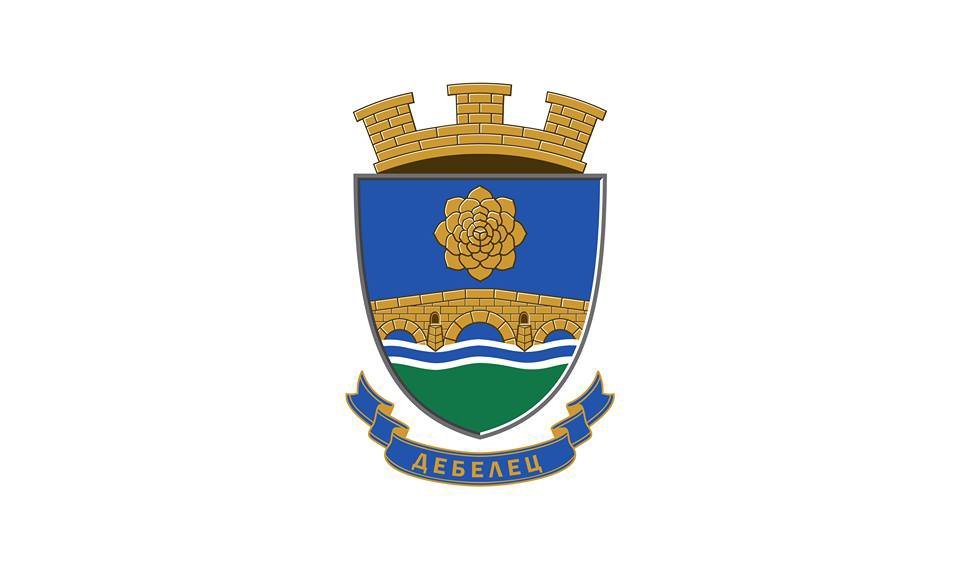
- Coat of arms

- Location of Debelets
- Coordinates: 43°02′37″N 25°37′15″E
- Country: Bulgaria
- Province (Oblast): Veliko Tarnovo

Government
  - Mayor: Snezhana Parvanova
- Elevation: 164 m (538 ft)

Population (2008)
  - Total: 4,128
- Time zone: UTC+2 (EET)
  - Summer (DST): UTC+3 (EEST)
- Postal Code: 5030
- Area code: 06117

Debelets (Bulgarian: Дебелец [dɛbɛˈlet͡s]) is a town in northern Bulgaria, part of Veliko Tarnovo Municipality in Veliko Tarnovo Province.

It is situated in the bottom side of the Belichinata valley near to the Belitsa river. North from the town is situated a high peak named "Selski bair".

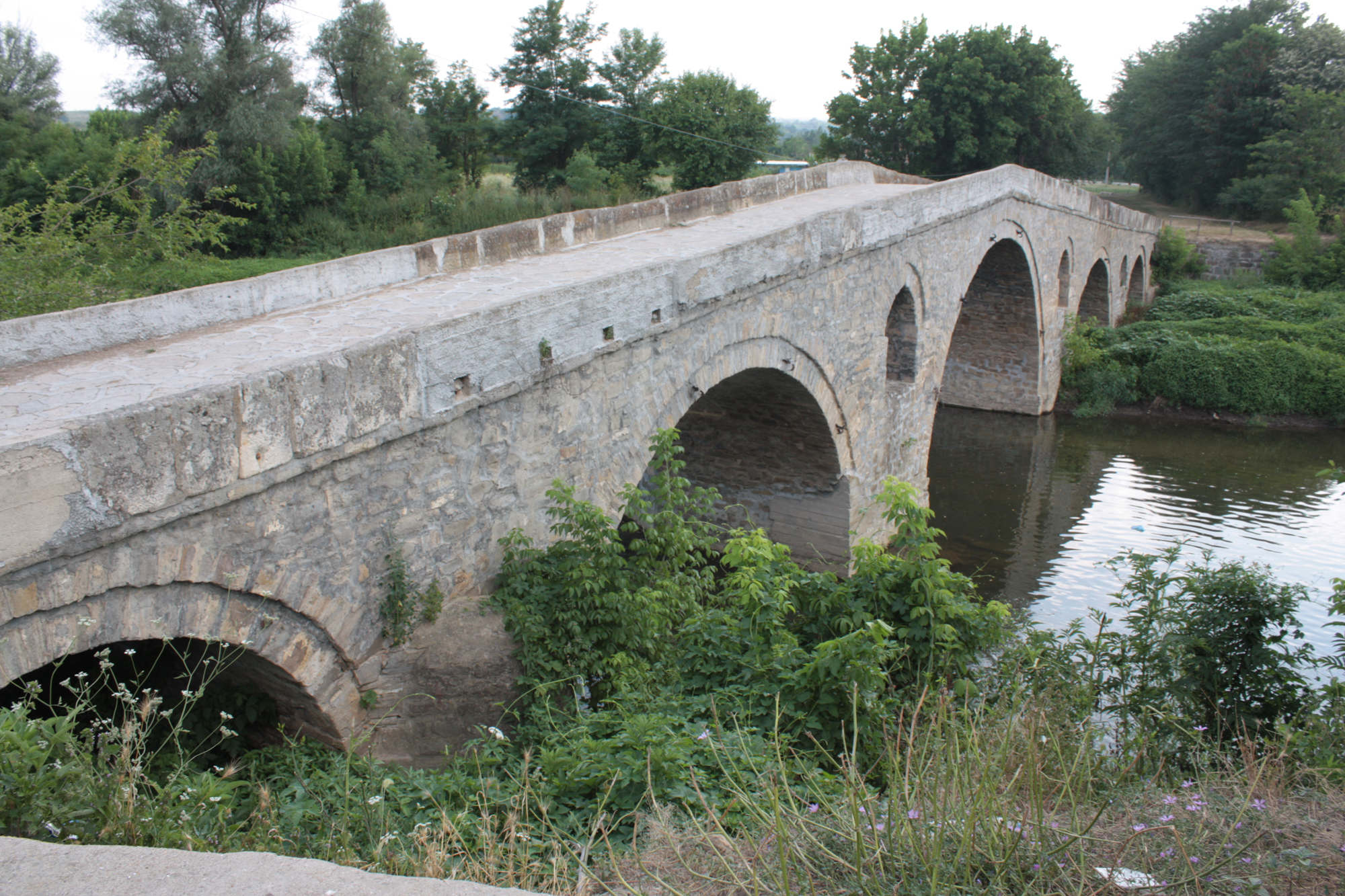
The 17th-century Old Bridge of Debelets
