= Tryavna Municipality =

Tryavna Municipality Община Трявна
- Municipality
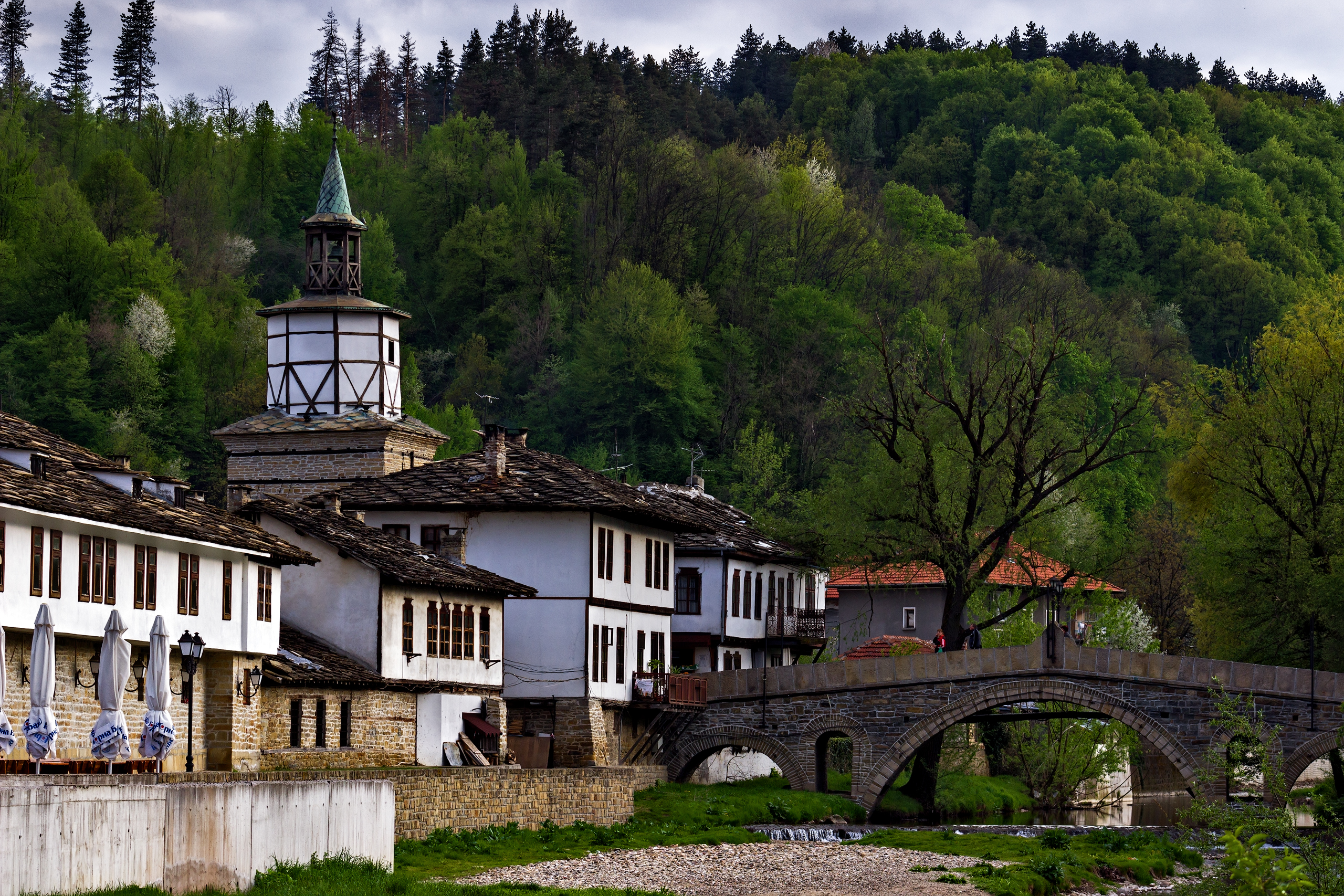

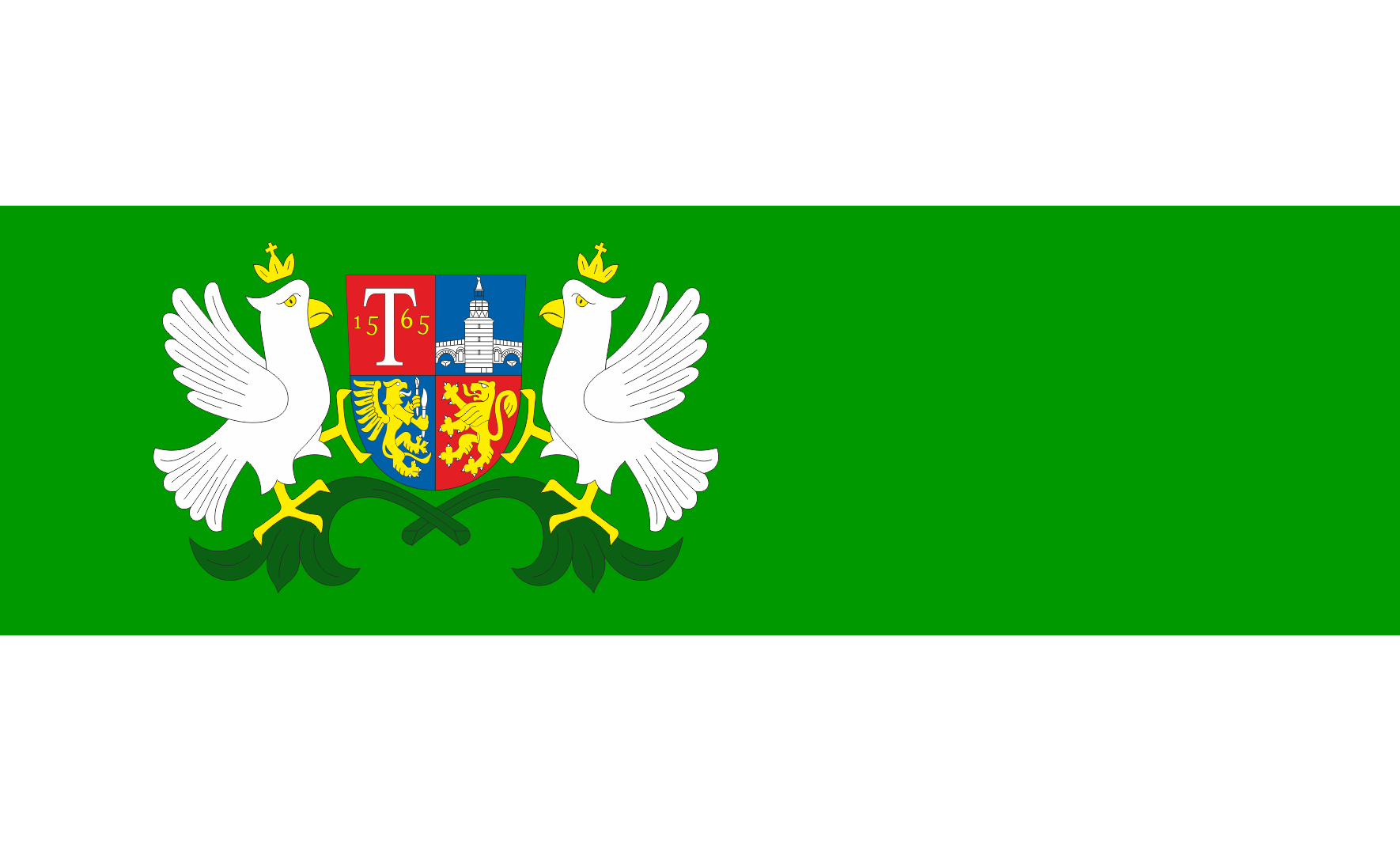
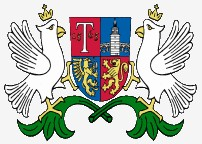
- Flag Coat of arms

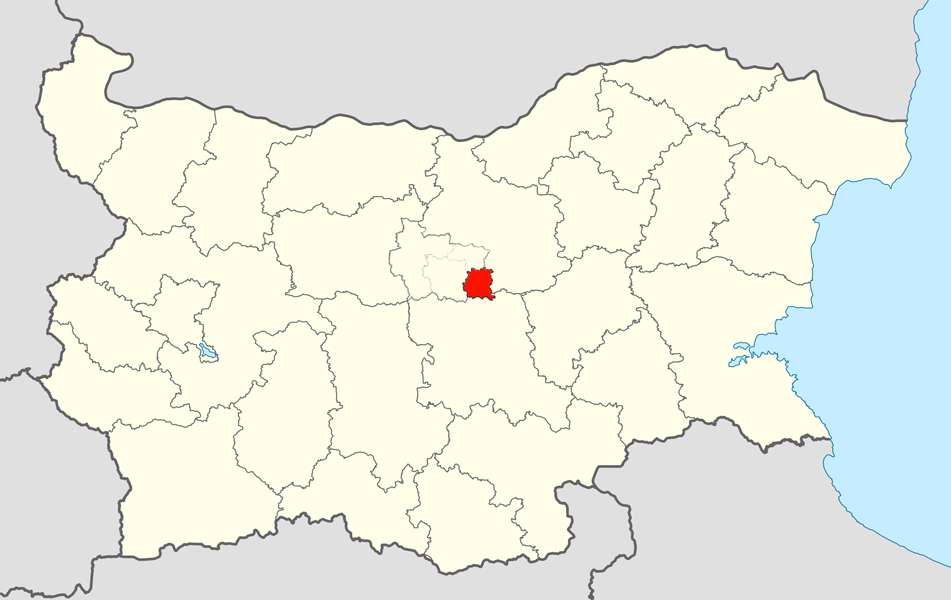
- Tryavna Municipality within Bulgaria and Gabrovo Province.
- Coordinates: 42°53′N 25°28′E
- Country: Bulgaria
- Province (Oblast): Gabrovo
- Admin. centre (Obshtinski tsentar): Tryavna

Area
  - Total: 255 km^{2} (98 sq mi)

Population (December 2009)
  - Total: 12,461
  - Density: 48.9/km^{2} (127/sq mi)
- Time zone: UTC+2 (EET)
  - Summer (DST): UTC+3 (EEST)

Tryavna Municipality (Bulgarian: Община Трявна) is a municipality (obshtina) in Gabrovo Province, North-central Bulgaria, located on the northern slopes of the central Stara planina mountain to the area of the so-called Fore-Balkan. It is named after its administrative centre - the town of Tryavna.

The municipality embraces a territory of 255 km^{2} (98 sq mi) with a population of 12,461 inhabitants, as of December 2009.

The area is best known with the Bulgarian National Revival architectural complex in the main town.

== Settlements ==
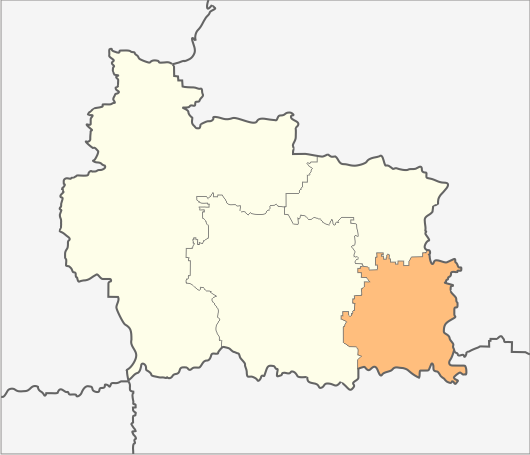
Tryavna Municipality within Gabrovo Province

(towns are shown in bold): Population (December 2009)

- **Tryavna** - **Трявна** - 9,831
- Azmanite - Азманите - 4
- Armyankovtsi - Армянковци - 4
- Bangeytsi - Бангейци - 34
- Bahretsi - Бахреци - 18
- Belitsa - Белица - 54
- Bizhovtsi - Бижовци - 13
- Brezhnitsite - Брежниците - 13
- Bardarite - Бърдарите - 4
- Bardeni - Бърдени - 6
- Chakalite - Чакалите - 4
- Chernovrah - Черновръх - 78
- Daevtsi - Даевци - 6
- Dimievtsi - Димиевци - 3
- Dobrevtsi - Добревци - 12
- Dolni Radkovtsi - Долни Радковци - 0
- Donchovtsi - Дончовци - 6
- Dragnevtsi - Драгневци - 10
- Drandarite - Драндарите - 3
- Darvari - Дървари - 0
- Daskarite - Дъскарите - 0
- Enchovtsi - Енчовци - 19
- Farevtsi - Фъревци - 3
- Fartuni - Фъртуни - 0
- Hristovtsi - Христовци - 7
- Kashentsi - Кашенци - 5
- Kerenite - Керените - 3
- Kiselkovtsi - Киселковци - 0
- Kisiytsite - Кисийците - 44
- Koevtsi - Коевци - 0
- Koychovtsi - Койчовци - 5
- Kolyu Ganev - Колю Ганев - 0
- Konarskoto - Конарското - 0
- Kreslyuvtsi - Креслювци - 5
- Krastets - Кръстец - 28
- Krastenyatsite - Кръстеняците - 0
- Kartipanya - Къртипъня - 0
- Malki Stanchovtsi - Малки Станчовци - 13
- Malchovtsi - Малчовци - 3
- Manevtsi - Маневци - 12
- Marutsekovtsi - Маруцековци - 0
- Mateshovtsi - Матешовци - 2
- Milevtsi - Милевци - 11
- Mrazetsi - Мръзеци - 13
- Nenovtsi - Неновци - 0
- Nikachkovtsi - Никачковци - 0
- Nikolaevo - Николаево - 11
- Nozherite - Ножерите - 3
- Noseite - Носеите - 6
- Okoliite - Околиите - 8
- Oshanite - Ошаните - 5
- Pavlevtsi - Павлевци - 0
- Planintsi - Планинци - 0
- **Plachkovtsi** - **Плачковци** - 1,930
- Pobak - Побък - 0
- Popgergevtsi - Попгергевци - 1
- Prestoy - Престой - 42
- Parzhigrah - Пържиграх - 0
- Radevtsi - Радевци - 57
- Radino - Радино - 3
- Raevtsi - Раевци - 2
- Raynushkovtsi - Райнушковци - 4
- Ralevtsi - Ралевци - 2
- Rachovtsi - Рачовци - 0
- Rashovite - Рашовите - 2
- Ruevtsi - Руевци - 10
- Svirtsi - Свирци - 4
- Sechen kamak - Сечен камък - 7
- Skortsite - Скорците - 2
- Staynovtsi - Стайновци - 5
- Stanchov Han - Станчов хан - 38
- Strazhata - Стражата - 0
- Stramtsi - Стръмци - 2
- Tomchevtsi - Томчевци - 3
- Yabalkovtsi - Ябълковци - 0
- Yavor - Явор - 2
- Yovovtsi - Йововци - 1
- Zelenika - Зеленика - 1

== Demography ==
The following table shows the change of the population during the last four decades.

Tryavna Municipality
Year	1975	1985	1992	2001	2005	2007	2009	2011
Population	18,876	17,928	16,450	14,391	13,245	12,876	12,461	...
Sources: Census 2001, Census 2011, „pop-stat.mashke.org“,

=== Religion ===
According to the latest Bulgarian census of 2011, the religious composition, among those who answered the optional question on religious identification, was the following:

Religious composition of Tyavna Municipality
Orthodox Christianity	89.4%
Catholicism	0.6%
Protestantism	0.7%
Islam	0.2%
No religion	3.7%
Prefer not to answer, others and indefinable	5.4%

== See also ==
- Provinces of Bulgaria
- Municipalities of Bulgaria
- List of cities and towns in Bulgaria
