= Chukovo =

Chukovo may refer to the following places in Bulgaria:

- Chukovo, Gabrovo Province
- Chukovo, Kardzhali Province
