= Gorni Dragoycha =

- Village
- Location within Bulgaria
- Coordinates: 42°57′N 25°28′E
- Country: Bulgaria
- Province: Gabrovo Province
- Municipality: Dryanovo
- Time zone: UTC+2 (EET)
  - Summer (DST): UTC+3 (EEST)

Gorni Dragoycha is a village in Dryanovo Municipality, in Gabrovo Province, in northern central Bulgaria.
