= Krancha =

- Village
- Location within Bulgaria
- Coordinates: 43.0000°N 25.4830°E
- Country: Bulgaria
- Province: Gabrovo Province
- Municipality: Dryanovo
- Time zone: UTC+2 (EET)
  - Summer (DST): UTC+3 (EEST)

Krancha is a village in Dryanovo Municipality, in Gabrovo Province, in northern central Bulgaria.
