= Dzhurovtsi =

- Village
- Location within Bulgaria
- Coordinates: 42.9336°N 25.4498°E
- Country: Bulgaria
- Province: Gabrovo Province
- Municipality: Dryanovo
- Time zone: UTC+2 (EET)
  - Summer (DST): UTC+3 (EEST)

Dzhurovtsi (Bulgarian: Джуровци [ˈd͡ʒuroft͡si]) is a village in Dryanovo Municipality, in Gabrovo Province, in northern central Bulgaria.
