= Skalsko =

Skalsko may refer to:

- Skalsko (Mladá Boleslav District), Czech Republic
- Skalsko, Bulgaria
