= Sokolovo, Gabrovo Province =

Sokolovo
- Village
- Location in Bulgaria
- Coordinates: 43.021°N 25.530°E
- Country: Bulgaria
- Province: Gabrovo Province
- Municipality: Dryanovo
- Time zone: UTC+2 (EET)
  - Summer (DST): UTC+3 (EEST)

Sokolovo is a village in Dryanovo Municipality, in Gabrovo Province, in northern central Bulgaria.
