= Yantra, Gabrovo Province =

Yantra Янтра
- Village
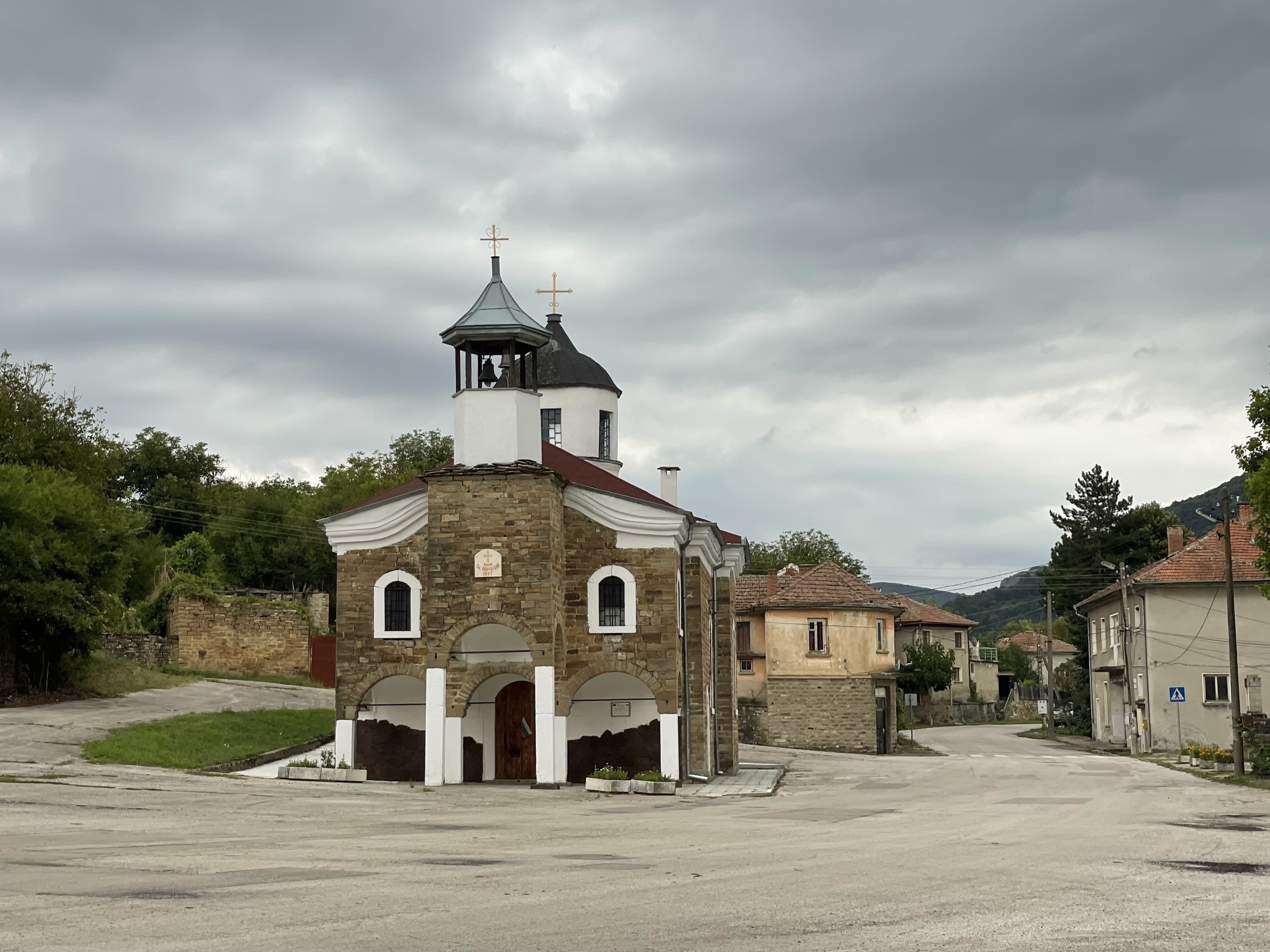
- Saint Nicholas church in Yantra

- Location in Bulgaria
- Coordinates: 42.979°N 25.319°E
- Country: Bulgaria
- Province: Gabrovo Province
- Municipality: Dryanovo
- Time zone: UTC+2 (EET)
  - Summer (DST): UTC+3 (EEST)

Yantra is a village in Dryanovo Municipality, in Gabrovo Province, in northern central Bulgaria with a population of 108 as of 2013.
