= Denchevtsi =

- Village
- Location within Bulgaria
- Coordinates: 43°00′N 25°26′E
- Country: Bulgaria
- Province: Gabrovo Province
- Municipality: Dryanovo
- Time zone: UTC+2 (EET)
  - Summer (DST): UTC+3 (EEST)

Denchevtsi is a village in Dryanovo Municipality, in Gabrovo Province, in northern central Bulgaria. It is around 4 km north west of the town of Dryanovo, and around 15 km south west of Veliko Tarnovo.
