= Ignatovtsi, Gabrovo Province =

Ignatovtsi
- Village
- Location in Bulgaria
- Coordinates: 42°56′00″N 25°31′30″E
- Country: Bulgaria
- Province: Gabrovo Province
- Municipality: Dryanovo
- Time zone: UTC+2 (EET)
  - Summer (DST): UTC+3 (EEST)

Ignatovtsi is a village in Dryanovo Municipality, in Gabrovo Province, in northern central Bulgaria.
