= Iskra, Gabrovo Province =

Iskra Искра
- Village
- Location in Bulgaria
- Coordinates: 42°56′25″N 25°28′20″E
- Country: Bulgaria
- Province: Gabrovo Province
- Municipality: Dryanovo
- Time zone: UTC+2 (EET)
  - Summer (DST): UTC+3 (EEST)

Iskra is a village in Dryanovo Municipality, in Gabrovo Province, in northern central Bulgaria. As of 2015, the population of the village is 2.
