= Garnya Cove =

Cove in Antarctica

Location of Robert Island in the South Shetland Islands.

Topographic map of Livingston Island, Greenwich, Robert, Snow and Smith Islands.

Garnya Cove (Bulgarian: залив Гърня, romanized: zaliv Garnya, IPA: [ˈzaliv ˈɡɤrɲɐ]) is a 1.2 km (0.75 mi)-wide cove on the east coast of Robert Island in the South Shetland Islands, Antarctica. It is entered southeast of Smirnenski Point and northwest of Perelik Point.

The feature is named after the settlement of Garnya in northern Bulgaria.

== Location ==
Garnya Cove is located at 62°22′25″S 59°22′40″W.

== Maps ==
- L.L. Ivanov. Antarctica: Livingston Island and Greenwich, Robert, Snow and Smith Islands. Scale 1:120000 topographic map. Troyan: Manfred Wörner Foundation, 2009. ISBN 978-954-92032-6-4 (Updated second edition 2010. ISBN 978-954-92032-9-5)
- Antarctic Digital Database (ADD). Scale 1:250000 topographic map of Antarctica. Scientific Committee on Antarctic Research (SCAR), 1993–2016.
