= Ganchovets =

Ganchovets Ганчовец
- Village
- Location within Bulgaria
- Coordinates: 42°59′N 25°31′E
- Country: Bulgaria
- Province: Gabrovo
- Municipality: Dryanovo

Population (2009)
  - Total: 159
- Time zone: UTC+2 (EET)
  - Summer (DST): UTC+3 (EEST)

Ganchovets (Bulgarian: Ганчовец) is a village in Dryanovo Municipality, Gabrovo Province, in northern central Bulgaria. As of 2009, it had a population of 159.
