= Garnya =

Garnya Гърня
- Village
- Location within Bulgaria
- Coordinates: 42°58′N 25°30′E
- Country: Bulgaria
- Province: Gabrovo Province
- Municipality: Dryanovo
- Time zone: UTC+2 (EET)
  - Summer (DST): UTC+3 (EEST)

Garnya is a village in Dryanovo Municipality, in Gabrovo Province, in northern central Bulgaria.

Garnya Cove in Antarctica is named after the village.
