= Karaivantsa =

Karaivantsa Караиванца
- Village
- Location within Bulgaria
- Coordinates: 42°59′N 25°24′E
- Country: Bulgaria
- Province: Gabrovo Province
- Municipality: Dryanovo

Population (2009)
  - Total: 43
- Time zone: UTC+2 (EET)
  - Summer (DST): UTC+3 (EEST)

Karaivantsa (Bulgarian: Караиванцa) is a village in Dryanovo Municipality, in Gabrovo Province, in northern central Bulgaria. As of 2009, it had a population of 43
