= Chukovo, Kardzhali Province =

Chukovo Чуково
- Village
- Location within Bulgaria
- Coordinates: 41.4833°N 25.4333°E
- Country: Bulgaria
- Province: Kardzhali Province
- Municipality: Momchilgrad
- Elevation: 286 m (938 ft)
- Time zone: UTC+2 (EET)
  - Summer (DST): UTC+3 (EEST)

Chukovo is a village in Momchilgrad Municipality, Kardzhali Province, southern Bulgaria. Chukovo has a population of 163 as of 2021, a -1.5% annual population change since 2011.

== Landmarks ==
In neighboring village Momchilgrad, a mosque built about 300 years ago can be located. It features two minarets and has consistently served as a place of worship. This mosque is unique in the region for having these distinctive features and continues to be a significant place for local worshippers.

The "Lion" rock site, located above the village, is another point of historical significance. This Thracian location has a cave with large niches, although accessing the cave may be challenging.

Nearby, the "Petrified Forest" in neighboring village Raven, about 13 km northeast of Chukovo, is a notable natural site. This protected area contains fossilized trees estimated to be around 30 million years old and attracts scientists and nature enthusiasts, especially during the summer.

The Borovets Reserve, also about 13 km from the village, is one of four important reserves in the Eastern Rhodopes. It plays an important role in preserving the easternmost pine forest in the region and is home to various plant and animal species, some of which are rare and protected on both national and international levels.
