= Gostilitsa =

Gostilitsa Гостилица
- Location of Gostilitsa
- Coordinates: 43°2′N 25°22′E
- Country: Bulgaria
- Provinces (Oblast): Gabrovo
- Municipality: Dryanovo

Government
  - Mayor: Nadya Kukuryakova
- Elevation: 396 m (1,299 ft)

Population (June 2016)
  - Total: 301
- Time zone: UTC+2 (EET)
  - Summer (DST): UTC+3 (EEST)
- Postal Code: 5390
- Area code: 06725
- License plate: EB

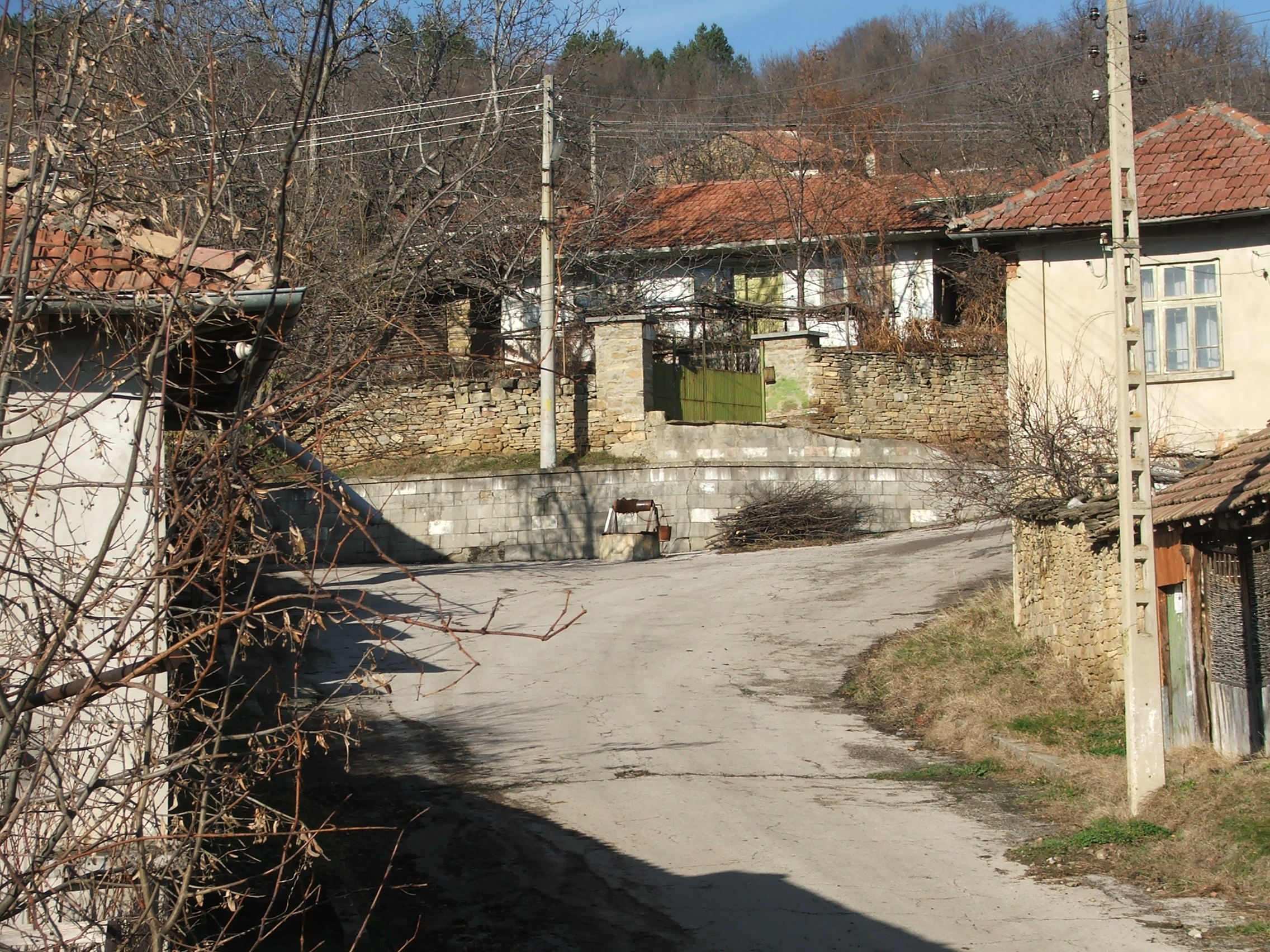
A street view in Gostilitsa

Gostilitza (Bulgarian: Гостилица) is a village in Northern Bulgaria.

== Geography ==
The village is located about 12 km northwest of Dryanovo, Bulgaria on the road to Sevlievo. It is situated in a small valley around the Yantra river. The climate is relatively mild, with summer temperatures reaching up to 36 degrees Celsius.

== History ==
The village was called Discoduraterae in ancient tribes and was inhabited by Thracians.

The surrounding region has a rich cultural history. For example, about two kilometers south of the village are the ruins of the Roman fortress Discoduratera. Built in the second half of the 2nd century AD, it was an important commercial center. It was located on the road from Nicopolis ad Istrum to Augusta Trajana. It also served as a customs station. Its layout conforms to other Roman stations: a square with each of its corners aligned with one of the four cardinal directions. The area of the fortress was roughly 12000 square meters.

In the middle of the 3rd century AD, Discoduratera was destroyed by the Goths. It was later re-built and live there continued on until the arrival of the Slavs. During the Second Bulgarian Empire the village came to live as a convenient place to spend the night in. The name of Gostilitsa is derived from the word gosti (Bulgarian: гости), Bulgarian for guests.

== Culture ==
Gostilitsa is home to the traditional Bulgarian folklore group Gostilovski Babi (Bulgarian: Гостиловски Баби, Grandma's from Gostilitza). The group has participated in and is a winner of several folklore events including the festival in Koprivshtitsa. As part of their act they recreate local traditions such as Laduvane, Trifon Zarezan, and Lazaruvane. During the Ponuda: on Babin Day (Bulgarian: Бабин Ден, Grandma's Day), all women dress as men and walk through the village until they run into a man whom they will then lift and carry around in the air.
