= Chanava =

Village and municipality in Slovakia

Chanava Hanva
- Municipality
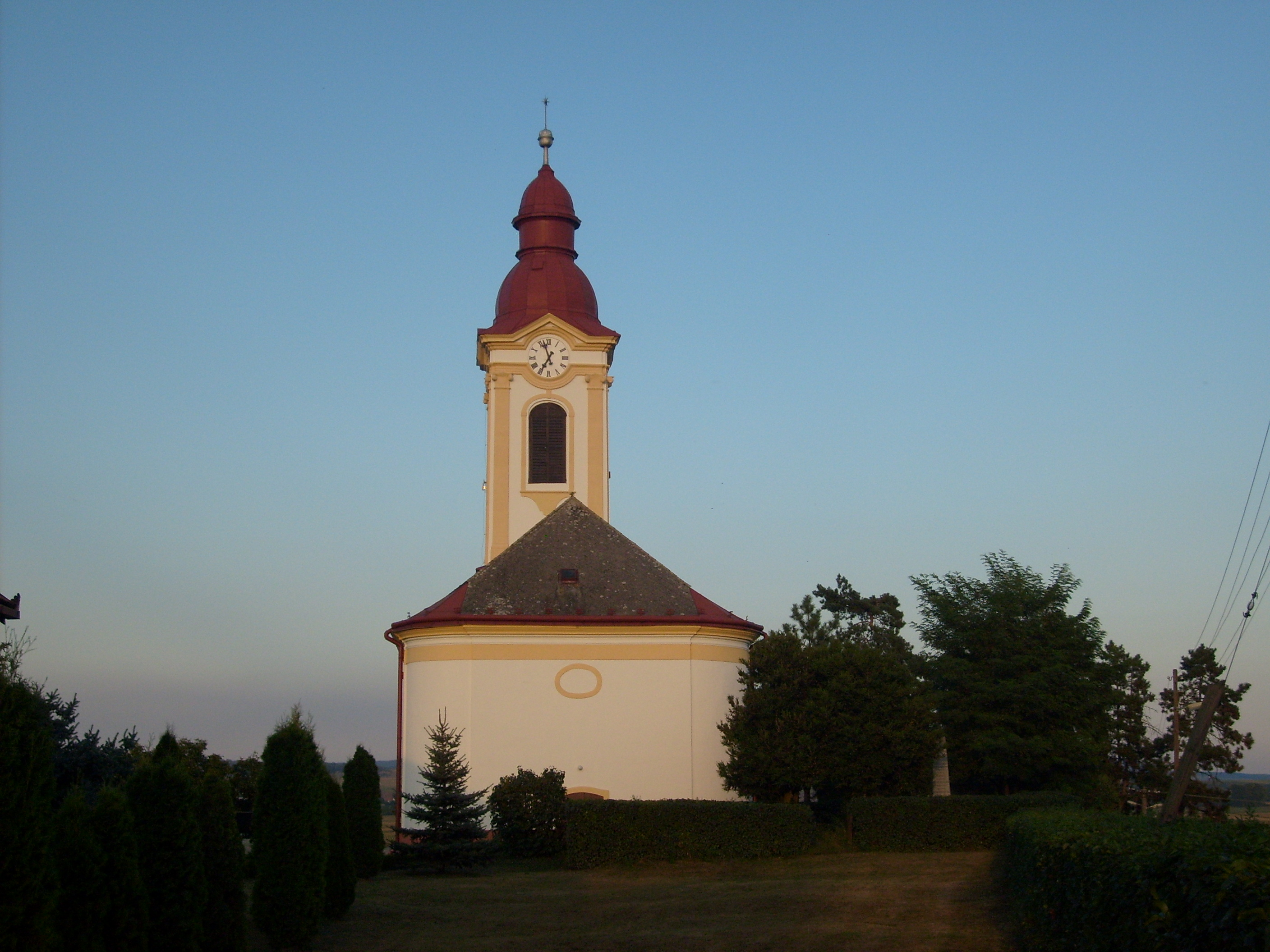

- Flag

- Location of Chanava in the Banská Bystrica Region Location of Chanava in Slovakia
- Coordinates: 48.33°N 20.30°E
- Country: Slovakia
- Region: Banská Bystrica Region
- District: Rimavská Sobota District
- First mentioned: 1266

Area
  - Total: 18.92 km^{2} (7.31 sq mi)
- Elevation: 173 m (568 ft)

Population (2025)
  - Total: 698
- Time zone: UTC+1 (CET)
  - Summer (DST): UTC+2 (CEST)
- Postal code: 980 44
- Area code: +421 47
- Vehicle registration plate (until 2022): RS
- Website: www.chanava-obec.sk

Chanava (earlier Hanava, Hanva; Hungarian: Hanva) is a village and municipality in the Rimavská Sobota District of the Banská Bystrica Region of southern Slovakia.

== Geography ==
The municipality lies at an altitude of 173 metres (568 ft) and covers an area of 18.92 km^{2} (7.31 sq mi) (2025).

== History ==
In historical records, the village was first mentioned in 1266 as Honua (1295 Hanua) as property of a monastery. In the 15th century it was the seat of the local noble family "Hanva", since the mid-16th century the "Hanvay", later on the "Darvasy" etc.

== Population ==
Population statistic (10 years)
Year	1995	2005	2015	2025
Count	668	704	704	698
Difference		+5.38%	+0%	−0.85%

Population statistic
Year	2024	2025
Count	715	698
Difference		−2.37%

It has a population of 698 people (31 December 2025).

=== Ethnicity ===
Census 2021 (1+ %)
Ethnicity	Number	Fraction
Hungarian	638	89.98%
Romani	127	17.91%
Slovak	68	9.59%
Not found out	16	2.25%
Total	709	

In year 2021 was 709 people by ethnicity 638 as Hungarian, 127 as Romani, 68 as Slovak and 16 as Not found out.

Note on population: The difference values of population numbers in the table "Population statistic" and in the sections "Ethnicity" & "Religion" is caused by the use of various statistical methods.

=== Religion ===
Census 2021 (1+ %)
Religion	Number	Fraction
Calvinist Church	334	47.11%
Roman Catholic Church	221	31.17%
None	97	13.68%
Evangelical Church	17	2.4%
Greek Catholic Church	15	2.12%
Jehovah's Witnesses	10	1.41%
Total	709	

In year 2021 was 709 people by religion 334 from Calvinist Church, 221 from Roman Catholic Church, 97 from None, 17 from Evangelical Church, 15 from Greek Catholic Church, 10 from Jehovah's Witnesses, 6 from Not found out, 4 from Other and not ascertained christian church, 2 from Old Catholic Church, 1 from Eastern Orthodox Church, 1 from Christian Congregations in Slovakia and 1 from United Methodist Church.

== Genealogical resources ==
The records for genealogical research are available at the state archive "Statny Archiv in Banska Bystrica,

Slovakia"

- Roman Catholic church records (births/marriages/deaths): 1789-1896 (parish B)
- Reformated church records (births/marriages/deaths): 1740-1896 (parish A)

== See also ==
- List of municipalities and towns in Slovakia
