= William Bruce Robertson =

19th-century Scottish preacher and hymn writer

Personal details
- Born: 1820
- Died: 1886 (aged 65–66)
- Denomination: (1) New Licht United Secession Church; (2) United Presbyterian Church (Scotland)
- Occupation: Minister

William Bruce Robertson (1820–1886), Scottish divine, was born at Greenhill, St. Ninians, Stirling, 24 May 1820, and was educated at the University of Glasgow and at the Secession Theological Hall, Edinburgh, where he made the acquaintance of Thomas de Quincey, and on his recommendation went to the University of Halle and studied under Friedrich Tholuck.

After travelling in Italy and Switzerland he was licensed to preach by the Presbytery of Stirling and Falkirk in 1843, and was soon after ordained at the United Secession Church (after 1847, the United Presbyterian Church) in Irvine, Ayrshire. In this charge he remained for 35 years, exercising from his pulpit a truly magnetic influence, not so discernible in his published sermons. From 1871 his health failed, in spite of several visits to Florence and the Riviera. He resigned his charge in 1878 and died at Bridge of Allan, 27 June 1886.

He wrote many hymns, among them a version of Dies Irae; several of them, together with letters, etc., are to be found in the Life by James Brown. A volume containing Robertson's lectures on Martin Luther and other subjects was published in 1892.
