= Skalsko, Bulgaria =

Skalsko
- Village
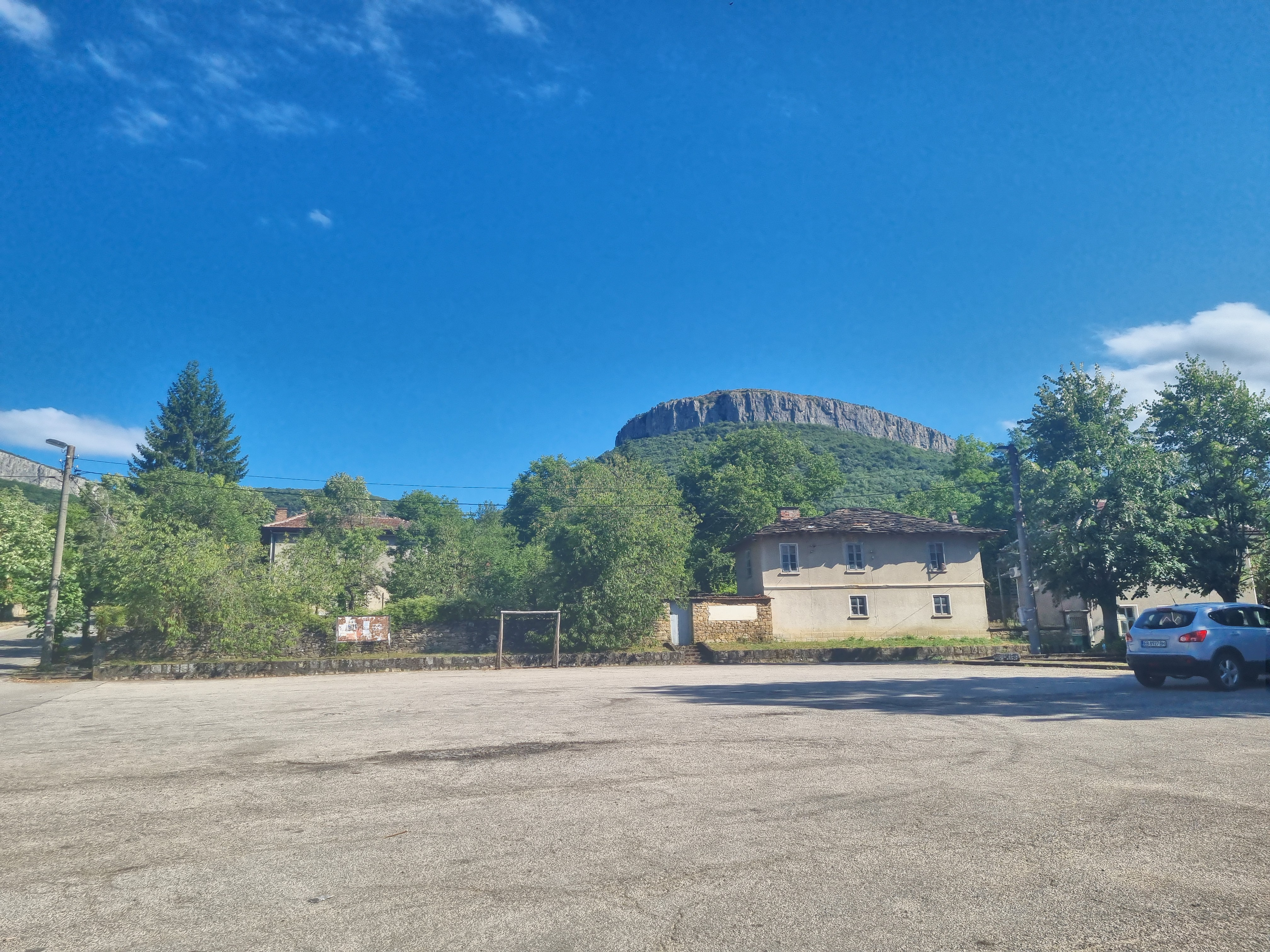
- View from the village of Skalsko, Bulgaria

- Location within Bulgaria
- Coordinates: 42.9667°N 25.3667°E
- Country: Bulgaria
- Province: Gabrovo Province
- Municipality: Dryanovo
- Time zone: UTC+2 (EET)
  - Summer (DST): UTC+3 (EEST)

Skalsko is a village in Dryanovo Municipality, in Gabrovo Province, in northern central Bulgaria.
