= Rumince =

Municipality of Slovakia

Rumince Runya
- Municipality
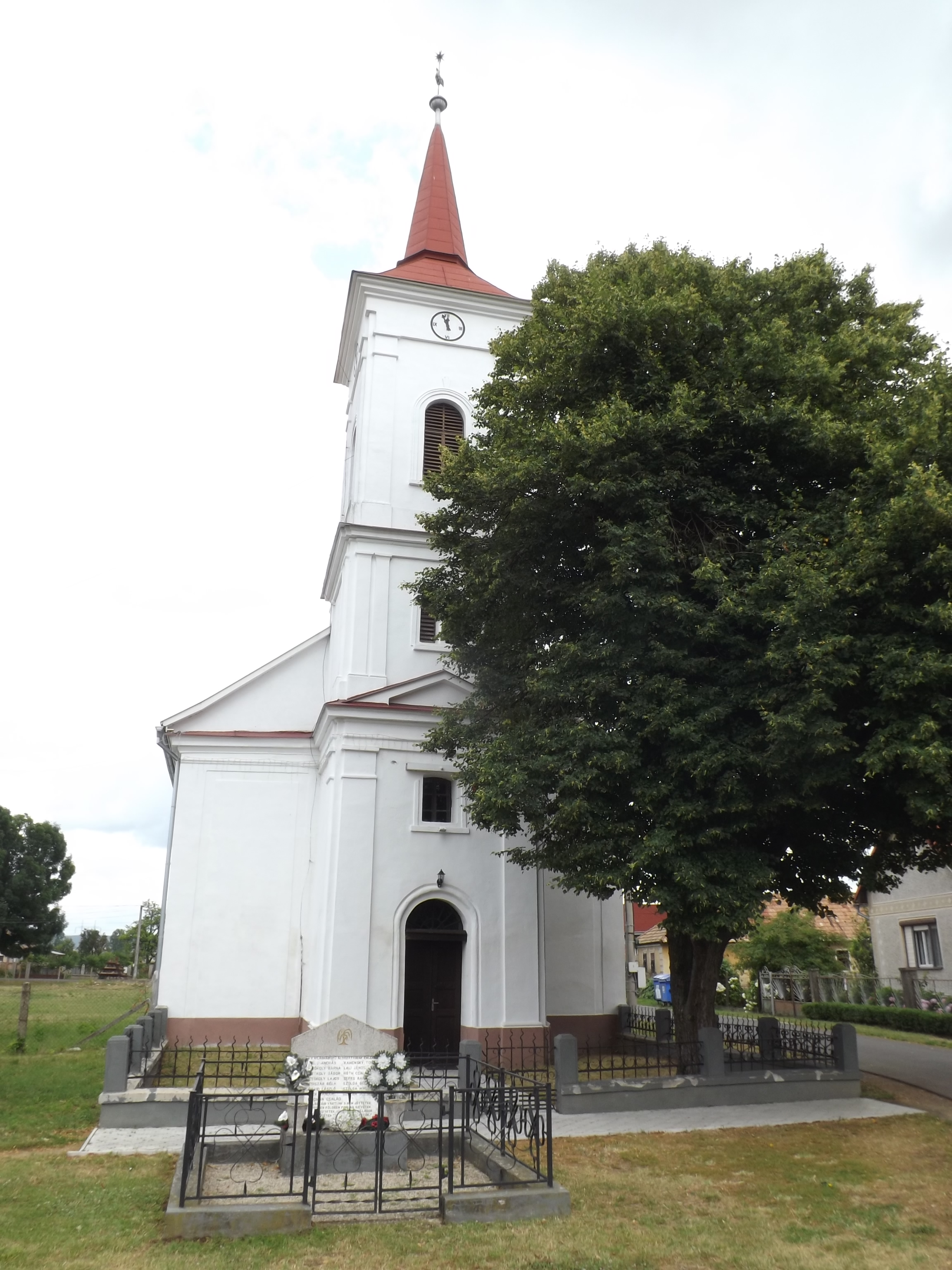

- Flag

- Location of Rumince in the Banská Bystrica Region Location of Rumince in Slovakia
- Coordinates: 48.37°N 20.30°E
- Country: Slovakia
- Region: Banská Bystrica Region
- District: Rimavská Sobota District
- First mentioned: 1266

Area
  - Total: 12.05 km^{2} (4.65 sq mi)
- Elevation: 170 m (560 ft)

Population (2025)
  - Total: 347
- Time zone: UTC+1 (CET)
  - Summer (DST): UTC+2 (CEST)
- Postal code: 980 50
- Area code: +421 47
- Vehicle registration plate (until 2022): RS
- Website: rumince.sk

Rumince (Hungarian: Runya) is a village and municipality in the Rimavská Sobota District of the Banská Bystrica Region of southern Slovakia.

== Geography ==
The municipality lies at an altitude of 170 metres (560 ft) and covers an area of 12.05 km^{2} (4.65 sq mi) (2025).

== Population ==
Population statistic (10 years)
Year	1995	2005	2015	2025
Count	419	401	365	347
Difference		−4.29%	−8.97%	−4.93%

Population statistic
Year	2024	2025
Count	347	347
Difference		+0%

It has a population of 347 people (31 December 2025).

=== Ethnicity ===
Census 2021 (1+ %)
Ethnicity	Number	Fraction
Hungarian	230	62.84%
Slovak	139	37.97%
Romani	32	8.74%
Not found out	10	2.73%
Total	366	

In year 2021 was 366 people by ethnicity 230 as Hungarian, 139 as Slovak, 32 as Romani, 10 as Not found out, 2 as Czech and 1 as Jewish.

Note on population: The difference values of population numbers in the table "Population statistic" and in the sections "Ethnicity" & "Religion" is caused by the use of various statistical methods.

=== Religion ===
Census 2021 (1+ %)
Religion	Number	Fraction
Calvinist Church	126	34.43%
Roman Catholic Church	84	22.95%
Evangelical Church	79	21.58%
None	58	15.85%
Not found out	9	2.46%
Total	366	

In year 2021 was 366 people by religion 126 from Calvinist Church, 84 from Roman Catholic Church, 79 from Evangelical Church, 58 from None, 9 from Not found out, 2 from Other and not ascertained christian church, 1 from Jewish community, 1 from Old Catholic Church, 1 from Eastern Orthodox Church, 1 from Christian Congregations in Slovakia, 1 from Greek Catholic Church, 1 from United Methodist Church, 1 from Church of the Brethren and 1 from Ad hoc movements.
