= Dryanovo Municipality =

Dryanovo Municipality Община Дряново
- Municipality
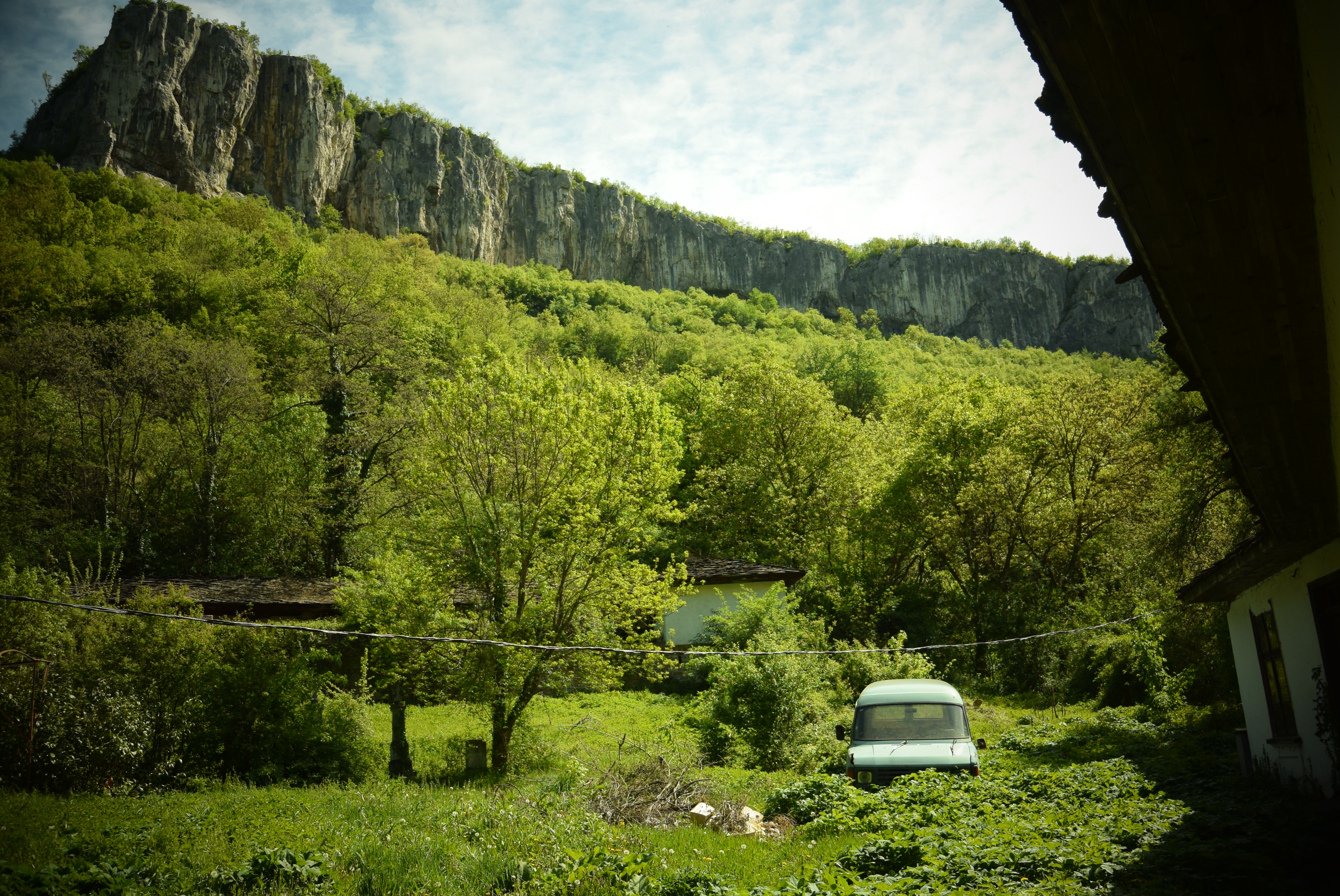

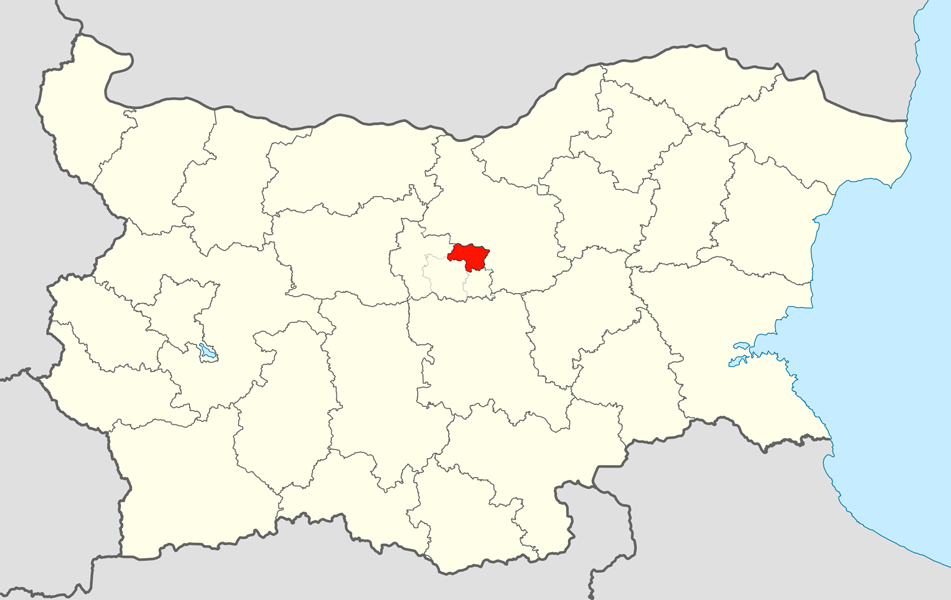
- Dryanovo Municipality within Bulgaria and Gabrovo Province.
- Coordinates: 42°59′N 25°27′E
- Country: Bulgaria
- Province (Oblast): Gabrovo
- Admin. centre (Obshtinski tsentar): Dryanovo

Area
  - Total: 248.5 km^{2} (95.9 sq mi)

Population (December 2011)
  - Total: 9,587
  - Density: 38.58/km^{2} (99.92/sq mi)
- Time zone: UTC+2 (EET)
  - Summer (DST): UTC+3 (EEST)

Dryanovo (or Drjanovo) Municipality (Bulgarian: Община Дряново) is a municipality (obshtina) in Gabrovo Province, North-central Bulgaria, located in the area of the so-called Fore-Balkan between Stara planina mountain and the Danubian Plain. It is named after its administrative centre - the town of Dryanovo.

The municipality embraces a territory of 248.5 km^{2} (95.9 sq mi) with a population of 9,587 inhabitants, as of December 2011.

The area is best known with the Dryanovo Monastery, situated close to the main town, and Bacho Kiro Cave.

== Settlements ==
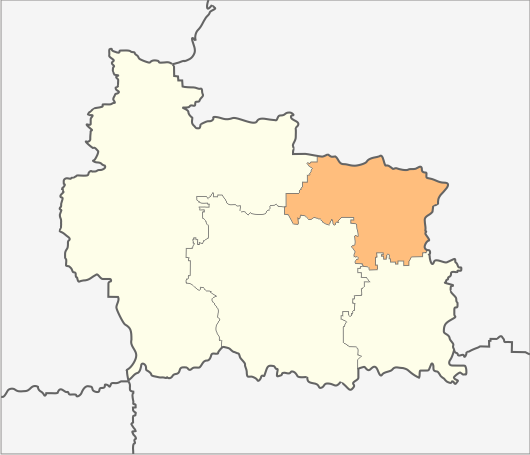
Dryanovo Municipality within Gabrovo Province

Dryanovo Municipality includes the following 46 places (towns are shown in bold):

Town/Village	Cyrillic	Population (December 2009)
**Dryanovo**	**Дряново**	8,043
Balvantsite	Балванците	1
Buchukovtsi	Бучуковци	8
Chukovo	Чуково	26
Denchevtsi	Денчевци	21
Dlagnya	Длъгня	24
Dobrenite	Добрените	4
Dolni Varpishta	Долни Върпища	3
Dolni Dragoycha	Долни Драгойча	3
Docha	Доча	10
Ganchovets	Ганчовец	159
Gesha	Геша	7
Glushka	Глушка	26
Gozdeyka	Гоздейка	22
Golemi Balgareni	Големи Българени	10
Gorni Varpishta	Горни Върпища	4
Gostilitsa	Гостилица	347
Garnya	Гърня	3
Ignatovtsi	Игнатовци	2
Iskra	Искра	4
Kalomen	Каломен	9
Karaivantsa	Караиванца	43
Katrandzhii	Катранджии	42
Kereka	Керека	142
Kosarka	Косарка	44
Kumanite	Куманите	4
Malki Balgareni	Малки Българени	0
Manoya	Маноя	48
Peyna	Пейна	9
Petkovtsi	Петковци	3
Plachka	Плачка	2
Radovtsi	Радовци	137
Ritya	Ритя	0
Runya	Руня	32
Rusinovtsi	Русиновци	10
Salasuka	Саласука	4
Skalsko	Скалско	96
Slaveykovo	Славейково	65
Sokolovo	Соколово	52
Syarovtsi	Сяровци	6
Shushnya	Шушня	2
Turkincha	Туркинча	26
Tsareva Livada	Царева ливада	789
Yantra	Янтра	139
Zaya	Зая	43
Total		10,502

== Demography ==
The following table shows the change of the population during the last four decades.

Dryanovo Municipality
Year	1975	1985	1992	2001	2005	2007	2009	2011
Population	16,966	15,525	13,557	11,705	11,009	10,724	10,502	9,587
Sources: Census 2001, Census 2011, „pop-stat.mashke.org“,

=== Religion ===
According to the latest Bulgarian census of 2011, the religious composition, among those who answered the optional question on religious identification, was the following:

Religious composition of Dryanovo Municipality
Orthodox Christianity	80.2%
Catholicism	0.4%
Protestantism	0.8%
Islam	2.8%
No religion	7.6%
Prefer not to answer, others and indefinable	8.2%

== See also ==
- Provinces of Bulgaria
- Municipalities of Bulgaria
- List of cities and towns in Bulgaria
