= I-7 road (Bulgaria) =

Road in Bulgaria

Republic Road I-7
- Републикански път I-7
- I-7 road highlighted in orange

Route information
- Length: 326.7 km (203.0 mi)

Major junctions
- From: Silistra; (Romania)
- To: Lesovo; (Turkey)

Location
- Country: Bulgaria
- Major cities: Dulovo, Shumen, Veliki Preslav, Yambol, Elhovo

Highway system
- Highways in Bulgaria

Republican road I-7 (Bulgarian: Републикански път I-7) is a first class road in eastern Bulgaria. It runs between Silistra, at the Danube border with Romania, and the Lesovo border crossing to Turkey. The total length of the road is 326.7 km (203.0 mi). The part of the road that crosses the Balkan Mountains through the Varbitsa Pass is in a very bad condition and in winter is closed for traffic. The road passes through the provinces of Silistra, Shumen, Burgas, Sliven and Yambol.

== Description ==
The road begins from the town of Silistra on the Danube at the border with Romania, at the passes through the eastern part of the town, and heads south. After 6.9 km it turns west, and after another 1.9 km heads south again through the eastern section of the Danubian Plain. After passing through the town of Alfatar the road gradually enters the hilly Ludogorie Plateau. It passes through the village of Cherkovna and the town of Dulovo, and enters Shumen Province.

There, the road continues south, gradually ascending the Ludogorets Plateau, passing successively through the villages of Zagoriche, Branichevo, Pristoe, Kliment, Izgrev and Venets. It runs through the Samuilovo Heights at the village of Drentsi and enters the Shumen Field, passing by the villages of Strahilitsa and Hitrino. It then reaches the village of Panayiot Volovo and north of the city of Shumen it forms a junction with the first class I-2 road at its Km 110.1 km and the two road duplicate for a distance of 6.1 km, after which the I-7 diverges and continues south. It bypasses Shumen from the east and southeast, reaches the valley of the river Golyama Kamchiya at the village of Han Krum and continues upstream along the river's left bank. The road passes to the east of the town of Veliki Preslav and enters the river gorge between the Dragoevska Planina to the southeast and the Preslavska Planina to the northwest. At the dam of the Ticha Reservoir, the road turns west along the north shores of the reservoir and enters the Gerlovo historical–geographical area. There, it passes successively through the villages of Ivanovo, Konevo and Mengishevo, bypasses the reservoir from the west and reaches the town of Varbitsa. After leaving the town, the road begins to ascend the northern slopes of the Balkan Mountains, crosses the range through the Varbitsa Pass (870 m) and enters Burgas Province.

After exiting the pass, road I-7 descends the southern slopes of the mountain range, crosses the river Luda Kamchiya at the village of Beronovo and heads southwest, gradually ascending the northern slopes of the Stidovska Planina section of the Balkan Mountains through the Mokren Pass (450 m). It enters Sliven Province and at the village of Mokren descends into the valley of the river Mochuritsa, a left tributary of the Tundzha. It then crosses the westernmost part of the Sungurlare Field and along the valley of the Marash, a right tributary of the Mochuritsa, the road enters Yambol Province and the eastern part of the Sliven Valley, reaching the Petolchkata junction with the first class I-6 road.

The road continues southwest, passes through the village of Zimnitsa and reaches the village of Veselinovo, where it enters the Yambol Field. It then makes a large arc, bypassing the city of Yambol from the east, passing successively through the villages of Mogila and Kozarevo, and reaching the village of Okop south of Yambol. From there the road continues southwards along the left banks of the river Tundzha, enters the Elhovo Field and reaches the town of Elhovo. It bypasses the town from the east, passes through the village of Granitovo, overcomes the western low hills of the Dervent Heights and reaches the border with Turkey at the Lesovo checkpoint.
