= Varbitsa (town) =

Varbitsa Върбица
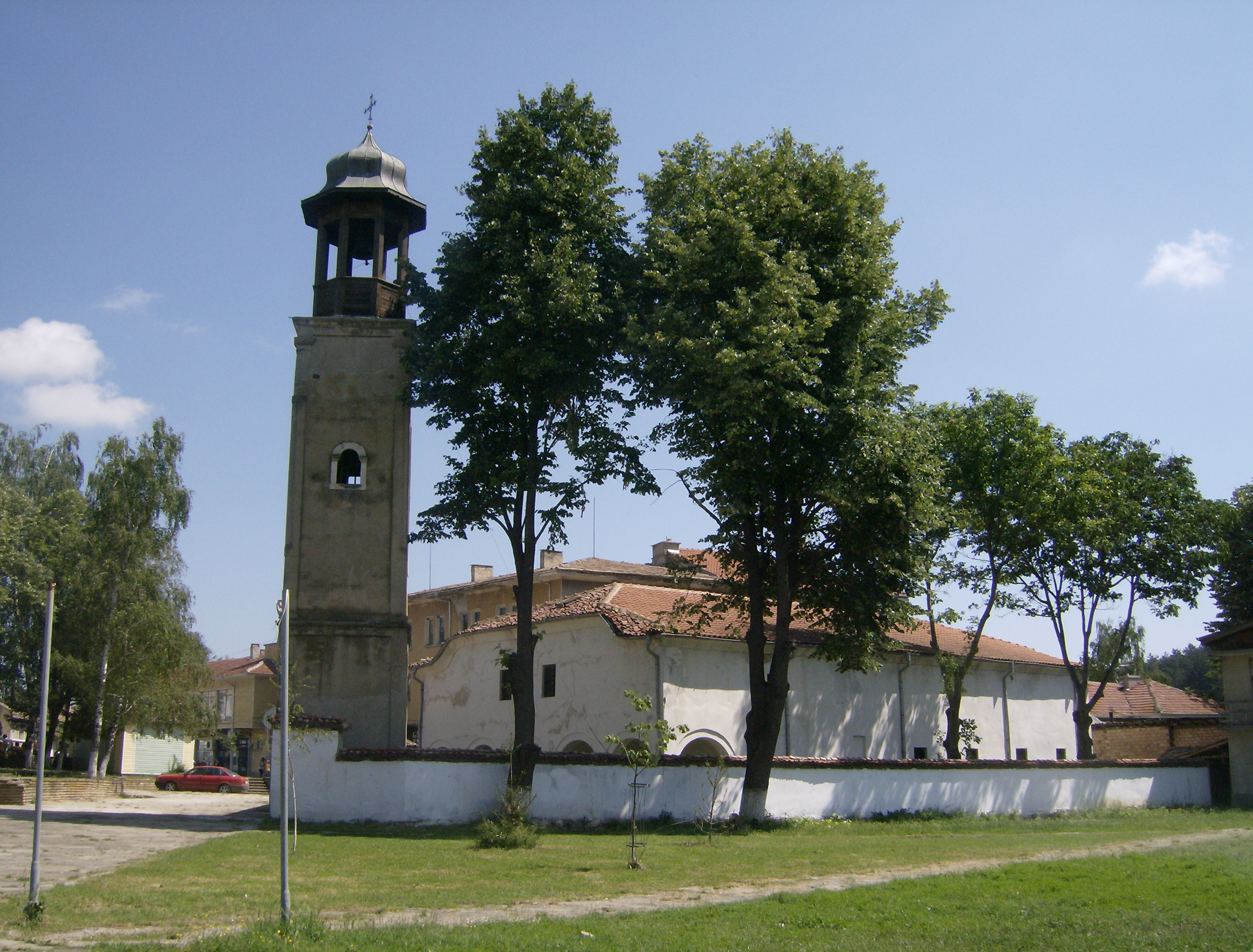

- Coat of arms

- Location of Varbitsa
- Coordinates: 42°59′42″N 26°40′23″E
- Country: Bulgaria
- Provinces (Oblast): Shumen

Government
  - Mayor: Merdin Bayryam
- Elevation: 430 m (1,410 ft)

Population (December 2009)
  - Total: 3,585
- Time zone: UTC+2 (EET)
  - Summer (DST): UTC+3 (EEST)
- Postal Code: 9870
- Area code: 05391

Varbitsa (Bulgarian: Върбица [vɐrˈbit͡sɐ]; lit. 'little willow'; also transliterated Vǎrbica) is a town in eastern Bulgaria, part of Shumen Province. It is the administrative centre of Varbitsa Municipality, which lies in the southwestern part of Shumen Province. As of December 2009, the town had a population of 3,585.

Varbitsa is located in the southeastern Danubian Plain, at the foot of the eastern Balkan Mountains, on both banks of the Gerila river. The area was populated in Antiquity by the Thracians and Romans, while the Slavs and Bulgars arrived in the Early Middle Ages. It is thought that the first ruler of the First Bulgarian Empire, Asparuh, settled the Severians in the region of the Varbitsa Pass in order to guard it in the 7th century. The pass was the site of the Battle of Pliska on 26 July 811, during which Krum of Bulgaria's forces routed the Byzantine army, killing and beheading Byzantine Emperor Nikephoros I.

== Municipality ==
Varbitsa municipality includes the following 16 places:

- Bozhurovo
- Byala Reka
- Chernookovo
- Ivanovo
- Konevo
- Kraygortsi
- Kyolmen
- Lovets
- Malomir
- Mengishevo
- Metodievo
- Nova Byala Reka
- Stanyantsi
- Sushina
- Tushovitsa
- Varbitsa
