= Kanagyol =

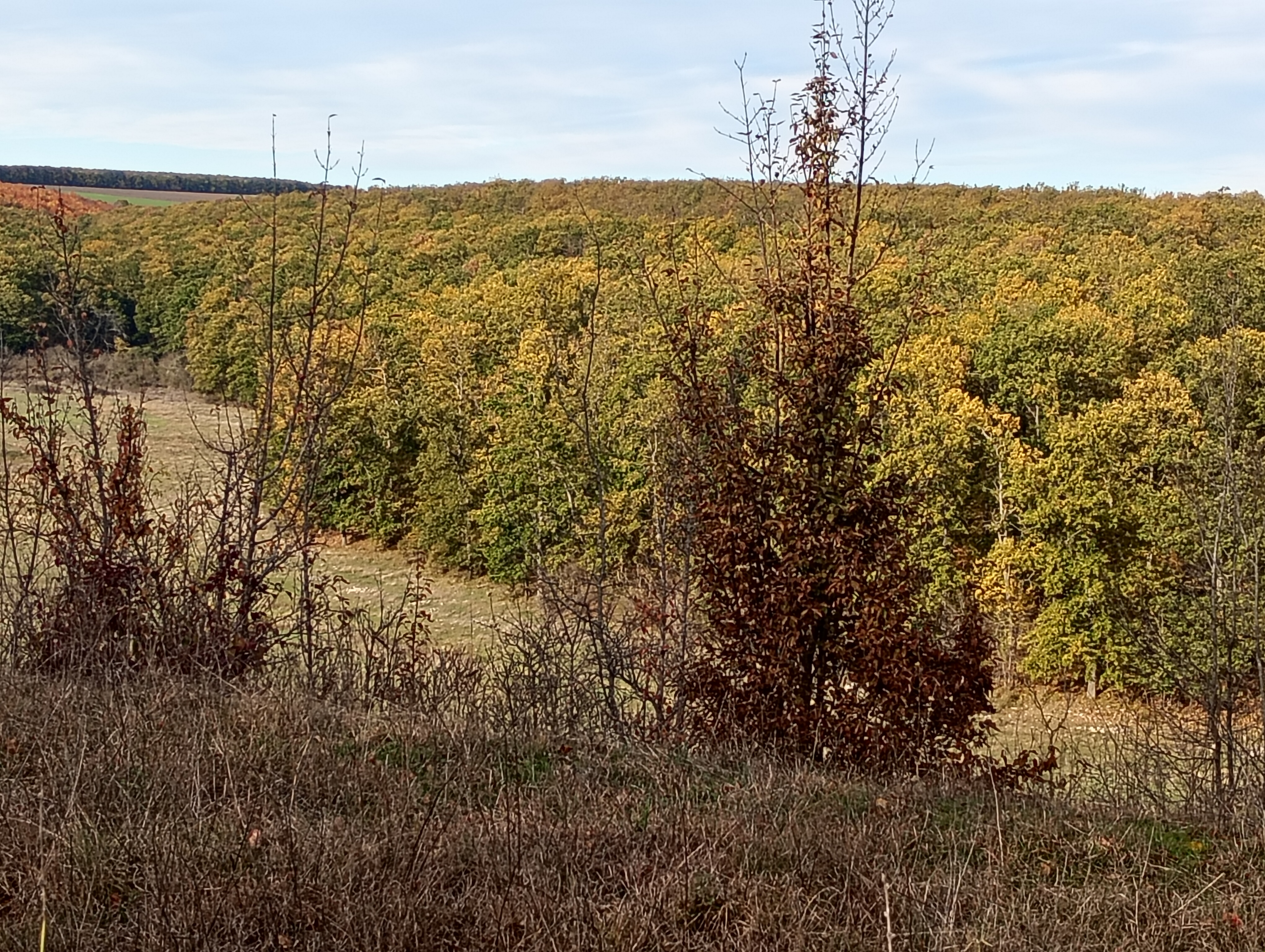
- The valley of the Kanagyol near Kaolinovo

- Location within Bulgaria

Location
- Country: Bulgaria, Romania

Physical characteristics
- Source
  - location: Samuilovo Heights
  - coordinates: 43°30′15.84″N 26°49′54.84″E
  - elevation: 470 m (1,540 ft)
- Mouth
  - location: Danube
  - coordinates: 44°3′55.08″N 27°24′23.04″E
  - elevation: 8 m (26 ft)
- Length: 110 km (68 mi)
- Basin size: 1,745 km^{2} (674 sq mi)

Basin features
- Progression: Lake Bugeac→ Almălău→ Danube→ Black Sea

The Kanagyol (Bulgarian: Канагьол, Romanian: Canora) is a river in northeastern Bulgaria and southeastern Romania. It is a tributary of the Danube via Lake Bugeac, which is drained by the Almălău. The river flows in the region of Dobruja. Its length is 110 km, of which over 100 km are in Bulgaria.

The Kanagyol takes its source from a spring at an altitude of 470 m in the Samuilovo Heights, close to the village of Kapitan Petko in eastern part of the Danubian Plain. Almost throughout its whole course the river flows northeast in a canyon-like valley deeply cut in Aptian limestones and loess. Downstream of the town of Kaolinovo the Kanagyol dries up and water flows only after torrential rains. At a kilometer northeast of the village of Bogorovo it enters Romania and then flows into the southwestern part of Lake Bugeac on the right bank of the Danube.

Its drainage basin covers a territory of 1,745 km^{2} or 0.2% of the Danube's total. The largest tributary is the Harsovska reka (91 km).

The Kanagyol has rain–snow feed with high water in March–June and low water in July–October. Its water flow is not constant. The average annual discharge at the village of Osenovets is 0.086 m^{3}/s.

The river flows in Shumen and Silistra Provinces. There are one town and six villages along its course. In Shumen Province are located Bortsi, Venets and Osenovets in Venets Municipality, and the town of Kaolinovo in Kaolinovo Municipality. In Silistra Province are Sratsimir and Bogorovo in Silistra Municipality. Downstream of the village of Skala, the Kanagyol serves as the regional border between the provinces of Dobrich and Silistra for 14 km. Its waters in the upper course are utilized for irrigation.
