= Kaspichan Municipality =

Kaspichan Municipality Община Каспичан
- Municipality
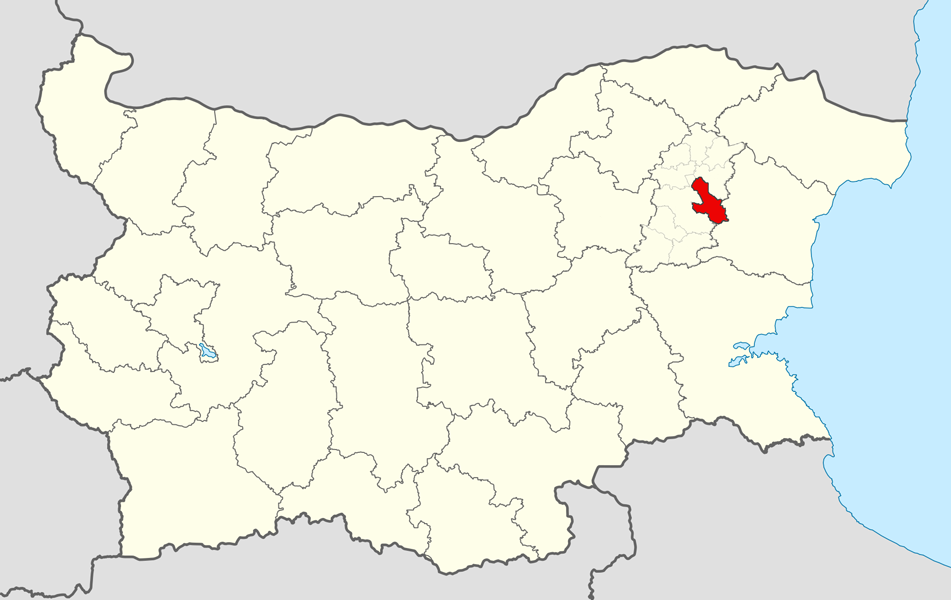
- Kaspichan Municipality within Bulgaria and Shumen Province.
- Coordinates: 43°17′N 27°7′E
- Country: Bulgaria
- Province (Oblast): Shumen
- Admin. centre (Obshtinski tsentar): Kaspichan

Area
  - Total: 275.06 km^{2} (106.20 sq mi)

Population (December 2009)
  - Total: 8,871
  - Density: 32.25/km^{2} (83.53/sq mi)
- Time zone: UTC+2 (EET)
  - Summer (DST): UTC+3 (EEST)

Kaspichan Municipality (Bulgarian: Община Каспичан) is a municipality (obshtina) in Shumen Province, Northeastern Bulgaria. It is named after its administrative centre, the town of Kaspichan.

The municipality embraces a territory of 279 km^{2} (108 sq mi) with a population of 8,871 inhabitants as of December 2009. The area is crossed from east to west by the eastern operating section of Hemus motorway, which is planned to connect the port of Varna with the capital Sofia.

== Settlements ==
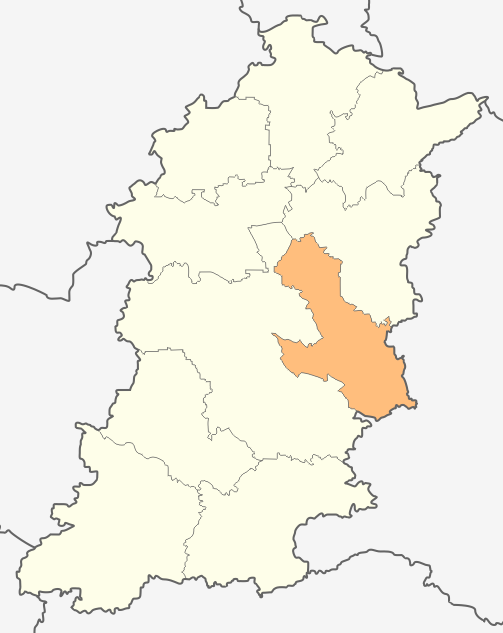
Kaspichan Municipality within Shumen Province

Kaspichan Municipality includes the following 9 places (towns are shown in bold):

Town/Village	Cyrillic	Population (December 2009)
**Kaspichan**	**Каспичан**	3,260
Kaspichan (village)	Каспичан	1,602
Kosovo	Косово	387
Kyulevcha	Кюлевча	496
Markovo	Марково	792
Mogila	Могила	408
**Pliska**	**Плиска**	1,051
Varbyane	Върбяне	288
Zlatna niva	Златна нива	587
Total		8,871

== Demography ==
The following table illustrates the population change over the last four decades.

Kaspichan Municipality
**Year**	1975	1985	1992	**2001**	2005	2007	2009	**2011**
**Population**	14,418	13,154	10,483	9,808	9,405	9,219	8,871	7,916
Sources: Census 2001, Census 2011, „pop-stat.mashke.org“,

=== Ethnic composition ===
According to the 2011 census, among those who answered the optional question on ethnic identification, the ethnic composition of the municipality was the following:

Ethnic group	Population	Percentage
Bulgarians	4,935	67.3%
Turks	1,073	14.6%
Roma (Gypsy)	925	12.6%
Others	292	4%
Undeclared	103	1.4%

==== Religion ====
According to the latest Bulgarian census of 2011, the religious composition, among those who answered the optional question on religious identification, was the following:

Religious composition of Kaspichan Municipality
Orthodox Christianity	68.6%
Catholicism	0.0%
Protestantism	0.6%
Islam	18.2%
No religion	4.3%
Prefer not to answer, others and indefinable	8.3%

== See also ==
- Provinces of Bulgaria
- Municipalities of Bulgaria
- List of cities and towns in Bulgaria
