= Harsovska reka =

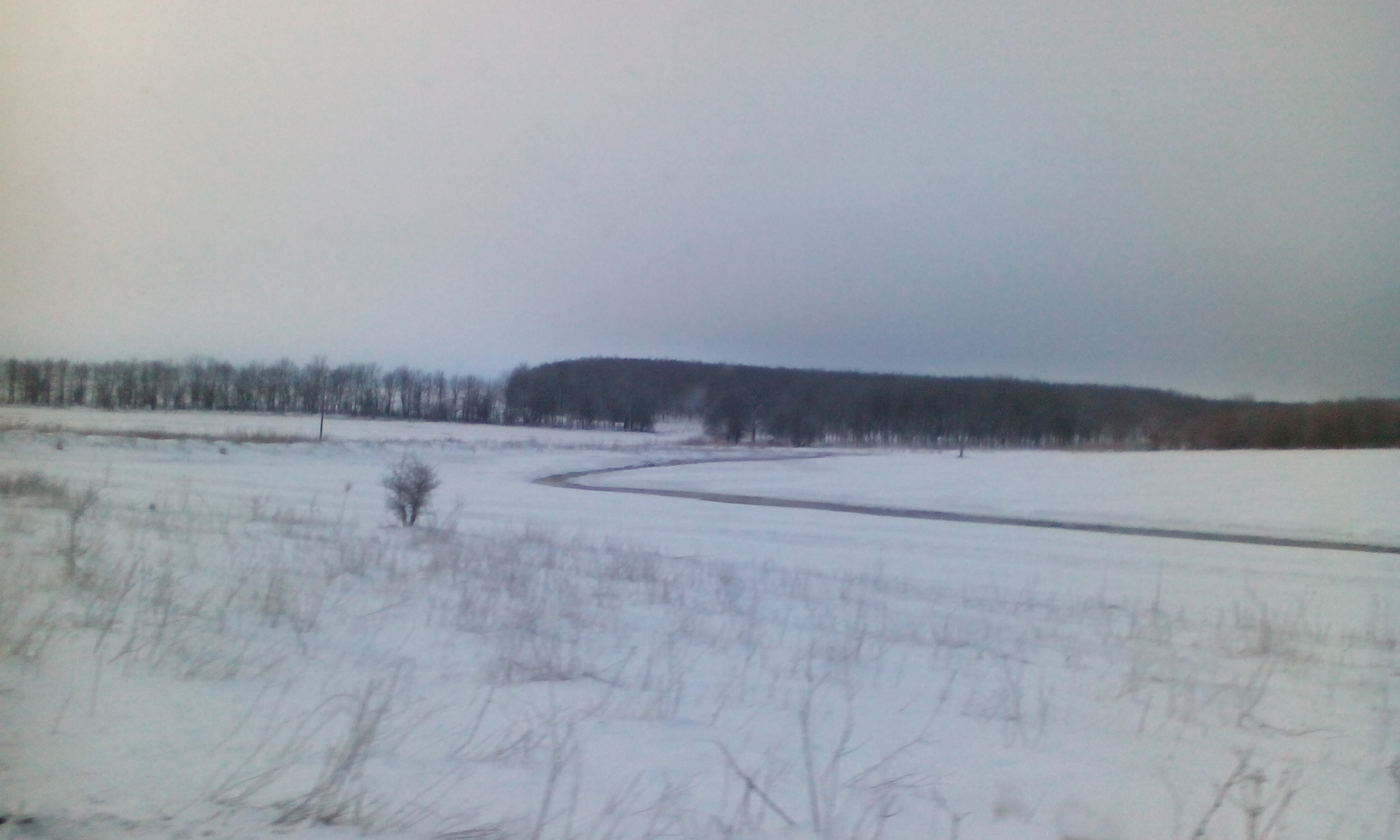
- The river north of Karavelovo

Location
- Country: Bulgaria

Physical characteristics
- Source
  - location: Stana Plateau
  - coordinates: 43°32′8.88″N 27°9′45″E
  - elevation: 397 m (1,302 ft)
- Mouth
  - location: Kanagyol
  - coordinates: 44°0′57.96″N 27°22′0.12″E
  - elevation: 24 m (79 ft)
- Length: 91 km (57 mi)
- Basin size: 1,096 km^{2} (423 sq mi)

Basin features
- Progression: Kanagyol → Danube

The Harsovska reka (Bulgarian: Хърсовска река) is a river in northeastern Bulgaria, a right tributary of the Kanagyol, itself a right tributary of the Danube. With a length of 91 km, it is the largest tributary of the Kanagyol.

The Harsovska reka takes its source at an altitude of 397 m in the northern part of the Stana Plateau, some 2.5 km northwest of the village of Harsovo in eastern part of the Danubian Plain. It flows east and northeast in a wide valley until the village of Pet Mogili. It the heads north, the valley becomes canyon-like, deeply cut in the Aptian and Serravallian limestones of the Ludogorie and Dobruja. Downstream of Tsani Ginchevo the river dries up and only receives occasional water feed. It flows into the Kanagyol at an altitude of 24 m in the southern outskirts of the village of Bogorovo.

Its drainage basin covers a territory of 1,096 km^{2}. The river has rain–snow feed with low annual discharge and irregular water flow. High water is March–June and low water is in July–October.

The river flows in Shumen, Dobrich and Silistra Provinces. There are four villages along its course, Harsovo, Karavelovo and Tsani Ginchevo in Nikola Kozlevo Municipality of Shumen Province, as well as Kutlovitsa in Alfatar Municipality of Silistra Province. There are several small reservoirs along the river and its tributaries to catch water for irrigation.
