= Gerlovo =

Small region of northern Bulgaria

Coordinates: 43°3′N 26°38′E

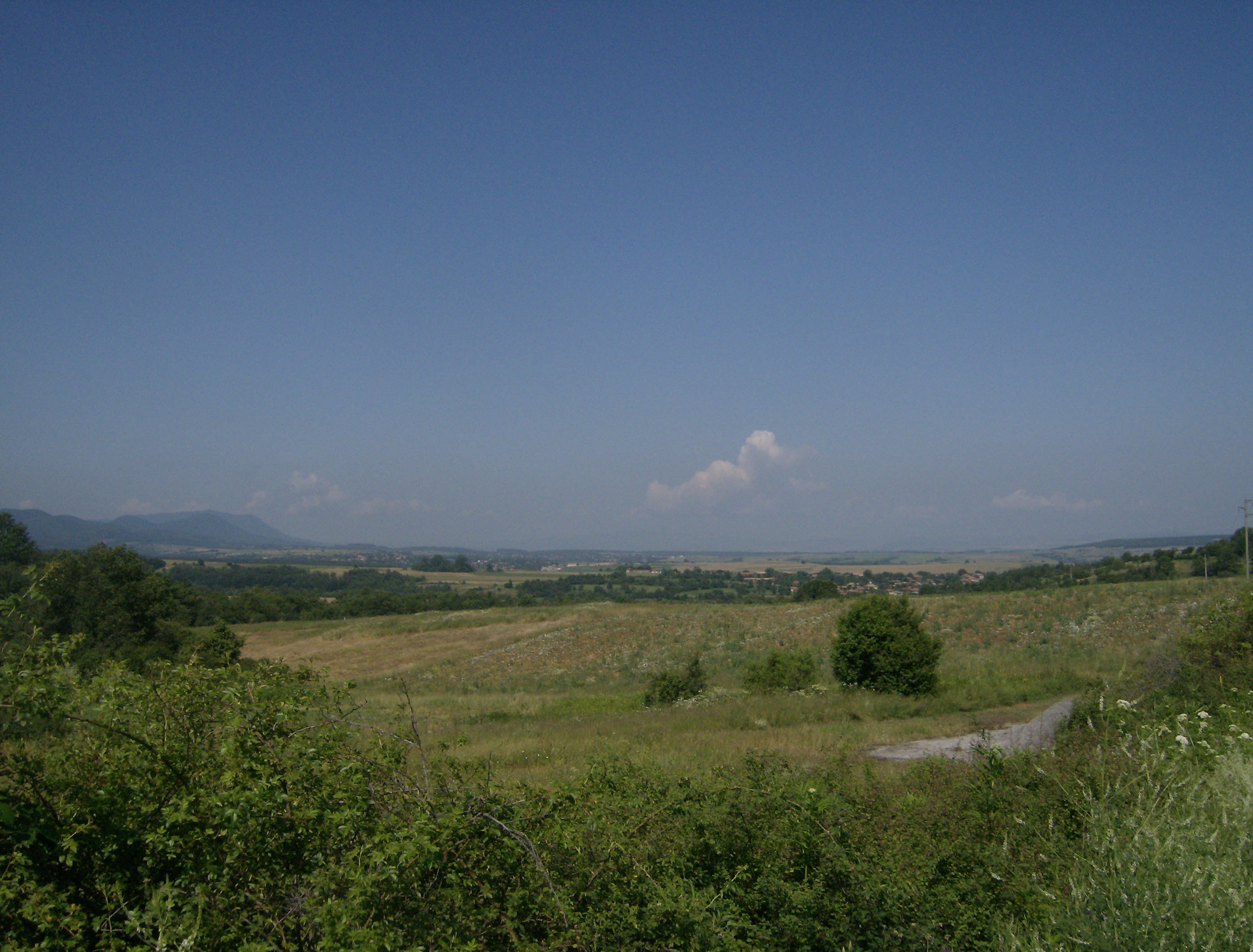
View of Gerlovo at Tushovitsa

Gerlovo or Gerilovo (Bulgarian: Герлово or Герилово), is a small geographic and ethnographic region in Northern Bulgaria, a hilly fertile valley in the northeastern Balkan Mountains, south of the Ludogorie region. It lies between the Lisa, Preslav-Dragoevo and Kotel-Varbitsa mountains and covers much of Varbitsa municipality of Shumen Province, with smaller parts in Omurtag municipality (Targovishte Province) and Kotel municipality (Sliven Province). The main river is the Kamchiya, which runs through the entire valley and forms the Ticha Reservoir; the only sizable town is Varbitsa. Four strategically important mountain passes run through the region: the Preslav Pass, Dervent Pass, Kotel Pass and Varbitsa Pass.

The population mostly consists of Bulgarians and Turks; there is an Alian community.

Gerlovo Beach on Ioannes Paulus II Peninsula in Livingston Island, Antarctica is named after Gerlovo region.
