= Ceair =

Ceair may refer to the following places in Romania:

- Ceair (Almălău), a tributary of the Almălău in Constanța County
- Ceair (Urluia), a tributary of the Urluia in Constanța County
- Ceairu, a village in Topliceni Commune, Buzău County
- Ceair, the old name of Răsurile village in Ileana Commune, Călărași County
