= Smyadovo =

Smyadovo Смядово
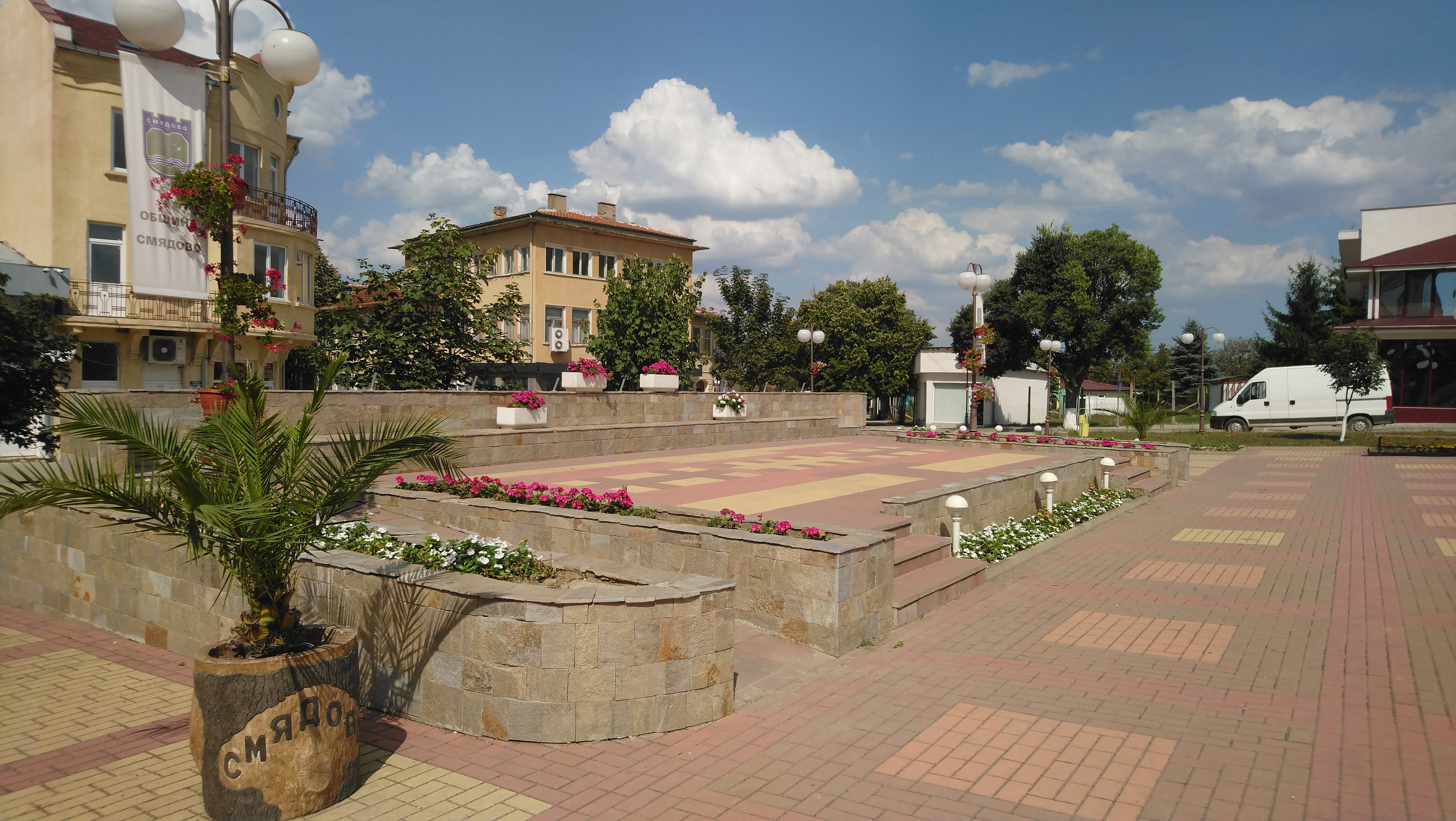
- Smyadovo Town Centre

- Location of Smyadovo
- Coordinates: 43°04′N 27°01′E
- Country: Bulgaria
- Province (Oblast): Shumen

Government
  - Mayor: Ivanka Petrova
- Elevation: 200 m (660 ft)

Population (December 2009)
  - Total: 4,036
- Time zone: UTC+2 (EET)
  - Summer (DST): UTC+3 (EEST)
- Postal Code: 9820
- Area code: 05351

Smyadovo (Bulgarian: Смядово, pronounced [ˈsmʲadovo]; ISO transliterated Smjadovo) is a town in eastern Bulgaria, part of Shumen Province. It is the administrative centre of the homonymous Smyadovo Municipality, which lies in the southeastern part of the province. As of December 2009, the town had a population of 4,036.

Smyadovo lies in the southeastern Danubian Plain, at the northern foot of the eastern Balkan Mountains. It was first mentioned in early Ottoman times (Evliya Çelebi mentions it as Smedovak) and was proclaimed a town in 1969.

Smyadovo Cove in Rugged Island in the South Shetland Islands, Antarctica is named after Smyadovo.

== Municipality ==
Smyadovo municipality covers an area of 354 square kilometres (of which 180 square kilometres arable) and includes the following 10 places:

- Aleksandrovo
- Byal Bryag
- Cherni Vrah
- Kalnovo
- Novo Yankovo
- Rish
- Smyadovo
- Veselinovo
- Yankovo
- Zhelad

== Notable people ==
- Alexandrina Miltcheva (1934–), mezzo-soprano
- Galena Vicheva Gencheva (1985–), Bulgarian pop-folk singer
