= Ticha Reservoir =

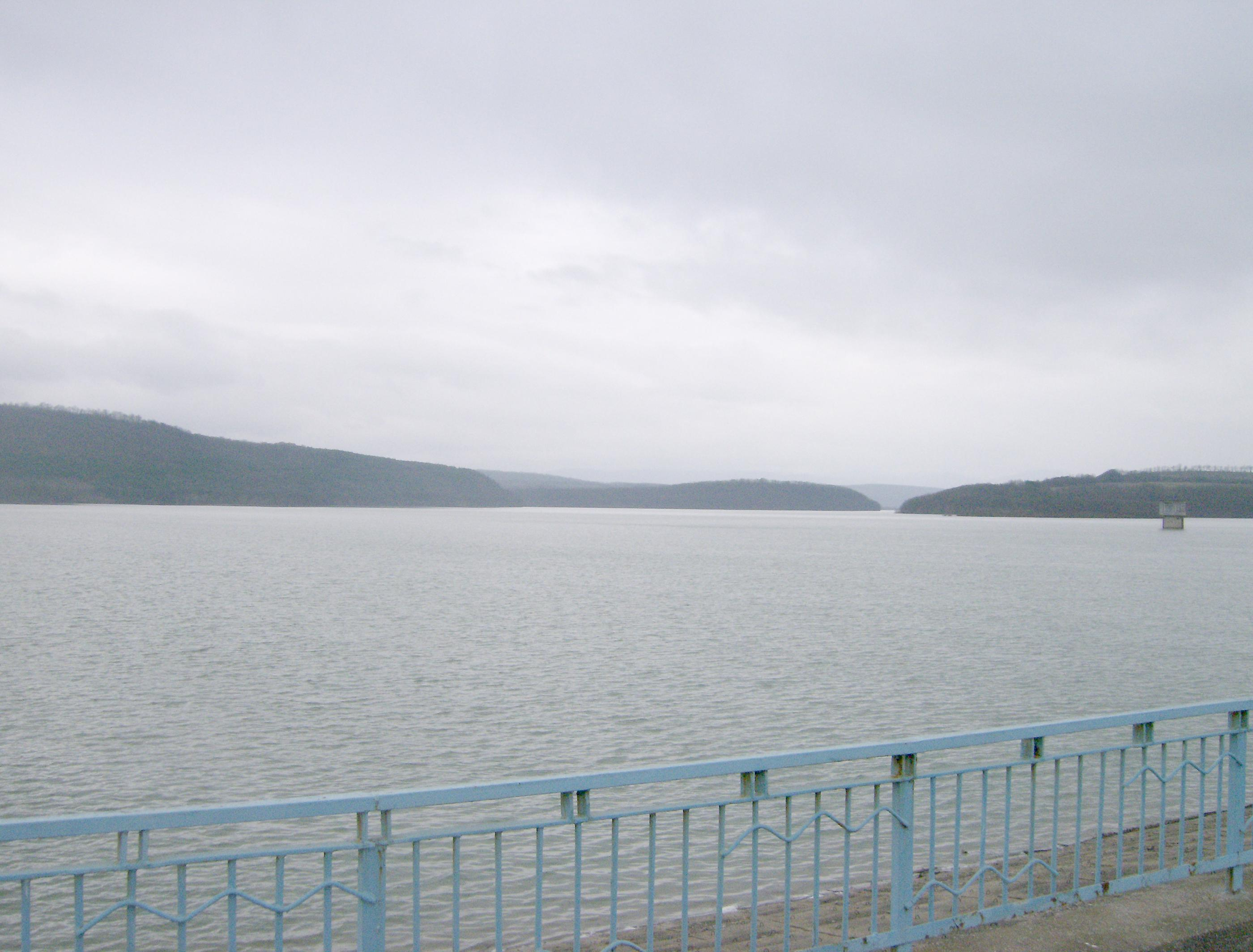

- Location within Bulgaria
- Location: Varbitsa Municipality, Shumen Province, Bulgaria
- Coordinates: 43°2′37″N 26°45′4″E
- Type: reservoir
- Primary inflows: Golyama Kamchia
- Primary outflows: Golyama Kamchia
- Basin countries: Bulgaria
- Max. length: 14 km (8.7 mi) (plus second arm)
- Max. width: 1 km (0.62 mi)
- Surface area: 1,870 ha (4,600 acres)
- Max. depth: 40 m (130 ft) (from differences in level)
- Water volume: 311.800 hm^{3} (252,780 acre⋅ft)
- Surface elevation: 185 m (607 ft)

Ticha Reservoir (Bulgarian: язовир Тича, yazovir Ticha) is a reservoir in Varbitsa Municipality, Shumen Province, northeastern Bulgaria, located to the north and northeast of the town of Varbitsa. It is one of the largest lakes of Bulgaria. The Ticha Dam is located in the northeastern part of the reservoir, in the southeastern part of Kotel Mountain.

The reservoir lies along the Golyama Kamchia River, one of the two rivers that merge to form the Kamchia. Before entering the reservoir, the river gathers waters from the hilly Gerlovo region. The name of the reservoir is derived from the medieval name of the Kamchia: the Ticha.

According to some measurements, it is the third-largest reservoir in Bulgaria. By design, the Ticha Reservoir is used mainly for irrigation; the total area which the reservoir can irrigate is 32,918 hectares (329.18 km^{2}). The Ticha Reservoir's total volume amounts to 311,800,000 m^{3} (1.101×10^{10} ft^{3}). The construction of the reservoir meant that two villages, Vinitsa and Staroselka, were depopulated and flooded; their commons now lie within the reservoir.

The dam overflowed in July 2005 and July 2010, threatening the surrounding villages and land. Due to this, the water level of the reservoir is closely monitored and dykes have been built. Unlike the 2005 flood, which caused significant damage in the village of Byal Bryag, the 2010 overflow did not lead to floods in the neighbouring populated places.

In February 2010, the tap water in Shumen, which comes from the Ticha Reservoir, was declared unsuitable for drinking as a result of the presence of E. coli strains.
