= Chernookovo =

Chernookovo may refer to the following places in Bulgaria:

- Chernookovo, Dobrich Province
- Chernookovo, Shumen Province
