= Smyadovo Municipality =

Smyadovo Municipality Община Смядово
- Municipality
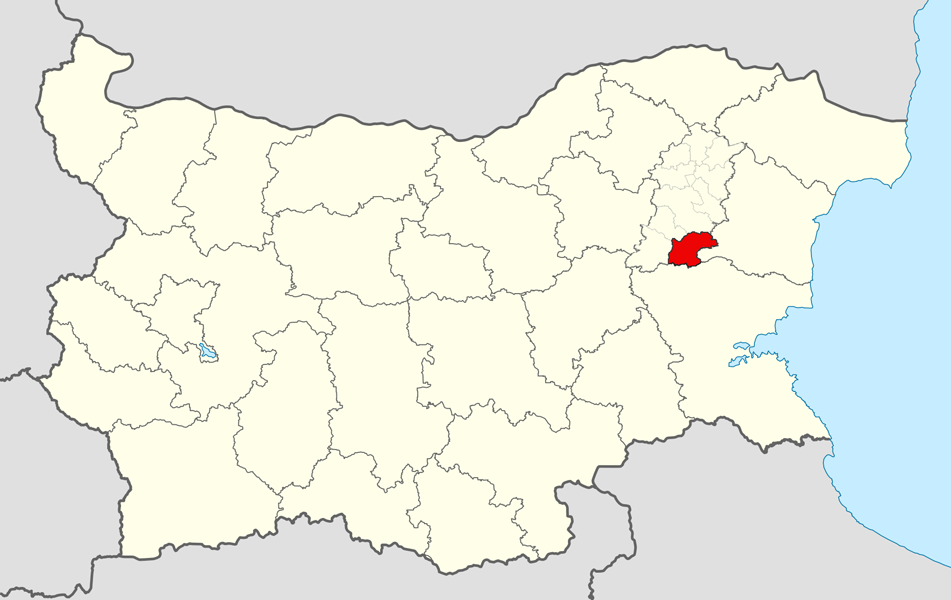
- Smyadovo Municipality within Bulgaria and Shumen Province.
- Coordinates: 43°1′N 26°58′E
- Country: Bulgaria
- Province (Oblast): Shumen
- Admin. centre (Obshtinski tsentar): Smyadovo

Area
  - Total: 364.6 km^{2} (140.8 sq mi)

Population (December 2009)
  - Total: 7,402
  - Density: 20.30/km^{2} (52.58/sq mi)
- Time zone: UTC+2 (EET)
  - Summer (DST): UTC+3 (EEST)

Smyadovo Municipality (Bulgarian: Община Смядово) is a municipality (obshtina) in Shumen Province, Northeastern Bulgaria, located in the vicinity of the northern slopes of the Eastern Stara planina mountain to the area of the so-called Fore-Balkan. It is named after its administrative centre - the town of Smyadovo.

The municipality embraces a territory of 364.6 km^{2} (140.8 sq mi) with a population of 7,402 inhabitants, as of December 2009.

== Settlements ==
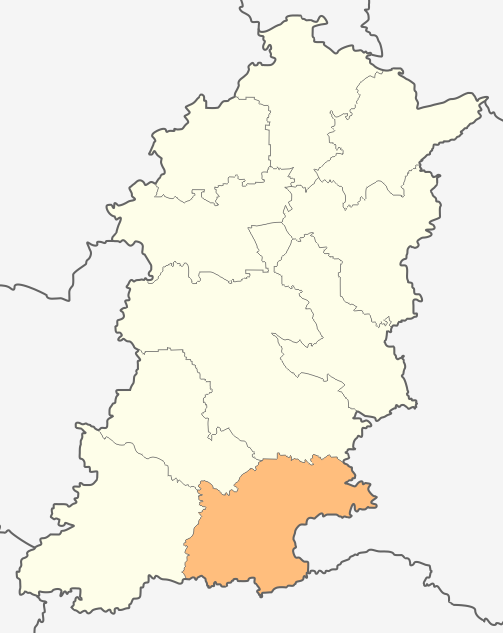
Smyadovo Municipality within Shumen Province

Smyadovo Municipality includes the following 10 places (towns are shown in bold):

Town/Village	Cyrillic	Population (December 2009)
**Smyadovo**	**Смядово**	4,036
Aleksandrovo	Александрово	81
Byal Bryag	Бял бряг	260
Cherni Vrah	Черни връх	183
Kalnovo	Кълново	241
Novo Yankovo	Ново Янково	155
Rish	Риш	776
Yankovo	Янково	821
Zhelad	Желъд	84
Total		7,402

== Demography ==
The following table shows the change of the population during the last four decades.

Smyadovo Municipality
**Year**	1975	1985	1992	**2001**	2005	2007	2009	**2011**
**Population**	11,753	10,479	9,519	8,242	7,818	7,570	7,402	...
Sources: Census 2001, Census 2011, „pop-stat.mashke.org“,

=== Ethnic composition ===
According to the 2011 census, among those who answered the optional question on ethnic identification, the ethnic composition of the municipality was the following:

Ethnic group	Population	Percentage
Bulgarians	3993	65.7%
Turks	1603	26.4%
Roma (Gypsy)	400	6.6%
Other	49	0.8%
Undeclared	30	0.5%

== See also ==
- Provinces of Bulgaria
- Municipalities of Bulgaria
- List of cities and towns in Bulgaria
