= Byala Reka, Shumen Province =

Byala Reka
- Location in Bulgaria
- Coordinates: 43°0′0″N 26°46′1″E
- Country: Bulgaria
- Province: Shumen Province
- Municipality: Varbitsa

Area
  - Total: 25.42 sq mi (65.85 km^{2})

Population (2007)
  - Total: 1,167
- Time zone: UTC+2 (EET)

Byala Reka (Bulgarian: Бяла река) is a village in the municipality of Varbitsa, located in the Shumen Province of northeastern Bulgaria. The village covers an area of 65.85 square kilometres (25.42 sq mi) and is located 283.452 kilometres (176.129 mi) from Sofia. As of 2007, the village had a population of 1167 people. The name (Byala Reka means "White river") origins from it`s old name "Akdere" ("White river" in Turkish). The religion of the local people is Islam. There are 2 mosques in the village.
