= Novi Pazar Municipality =

Novi Pazar Municipality Община Нови пазар
- Municipality
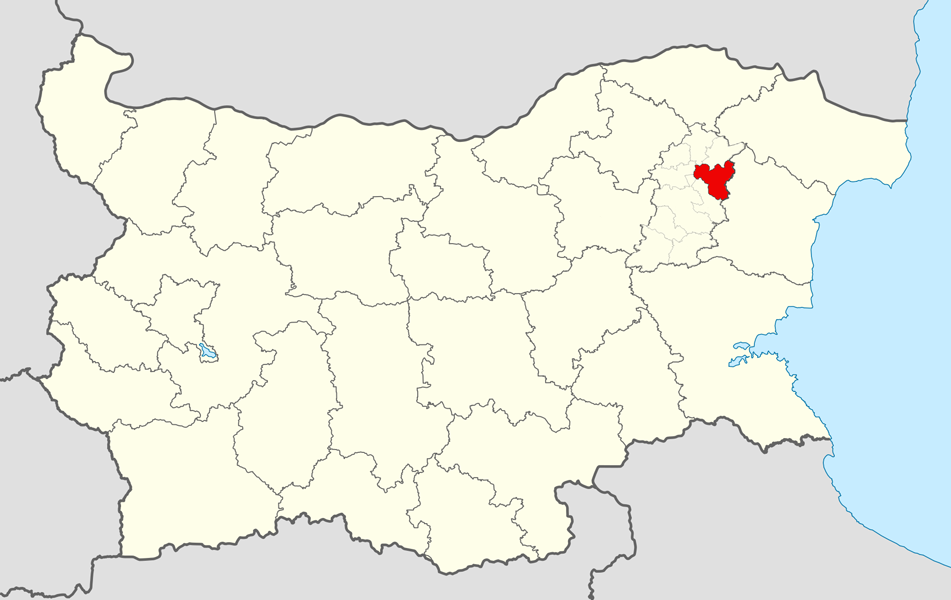
- Novi Pazar Municipality within Bulgaria and Shumen Province.
- Coordinates: 43°21′N 27°12′E
- Country: Bulgaria
- Province (Oblast): Shumen
- Admin. centre (Obshtinski tsentar): Novi Pazar

Area
  - Total: 317.65 km^{2} (122.65 sq mi)

Population (December 2009)
  - Total: 18,476
  - Density: 58.165/km^{2} (150.65/sq mi)
- Time zone: UTC+2 (EET)
  - Summer (DST): UTC+3 (EEST)

Novi Pazar Municipality (Bulgarian: Община Нови пазар) is a municipality (obshtina) in Shumen Province, Northeastern Bulgaria, located between Ludogorie and Provadia Plateau, not far from South Dobrudzha geographical region. It is named after its administrative centre - the town of Novi Pazar.

The municipality embraces a territory of 318 km^{2} (123 sq mi) with a population of 18,476 inhabitants, as of December 2009. The southernmost part of the area is crossed by the eastern operating section of Hemus motorway which is planned to connect the port of Varna with the country capital – Sofia.

== Settlements ==
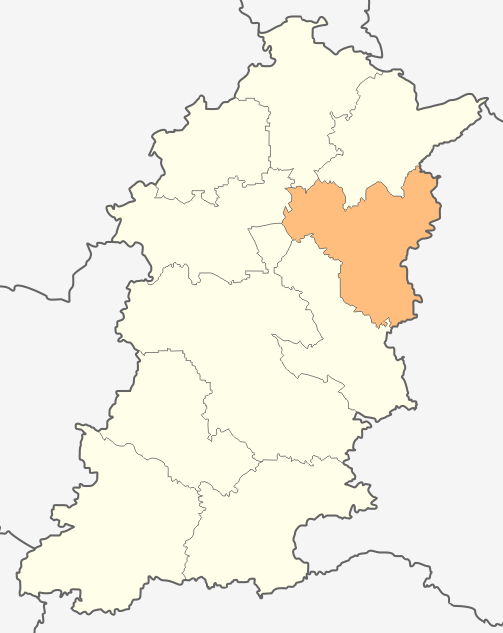
Novi Pazar Municipality within Shumen Province

Novi Pazar Municipality includes the following 16 places (towns are shown in bold):

Town/Village	Cyrillic	Population (December 2009)
**Novi Pazar**	**Нови Пазар**	12,673
Bedzhene	Беджене	30
Enevo	Енево	448
Izbul	Избул	321
Mirovtsi	Мировци	508
Pamukchii	Памукчии	1,277
Pisarevo	Писарево	95
Praventsi	Правенци	300
Preselka	Преселка	264
Sechishte	Сечище	132
Stan	Стан	524
Stoyan Mihaylovski	Стоян Михайловски	824
Tranitsa	Тръница	140
Voyvoda	Войвода	518
Zaychino Oreshe	Зайчино Ореше	229
Zhilino	Жилино	193
Total		18,476

== Demography ==
The following table shows the change of the population during the last four decades.

Novi Pazar Municipality
**Year**	1975	1985	1992	**2001**	2005	2007	2009	**2011**
**Population**	25,685	24,826	20,985	19,559	19,141	18,934	18,476	16,879
Sources: Census 2001, Census 2011, „pop-stat.mashke.org“,

=== Ethnic composition ===
According to the 2011 census, among those who answered the optional question on ethnic identification, the ethnic composition of the municipality was the following:

Ethnic group	Population	Percentage
Bulgarians	9872	62.9%
Turks	3941	25.1%
Roma (Gypsy)	1720	11%
Other	59	0.4%
Undeclared	112	0.7%

== See also ==
- Provinces of Bulgaria
- Municipalities of Bulgaria
- List of cities and towns in Bulgaria
