= Ceair (Almălău) =

- Location within Romania

Location
- Country: Romania
- Counties: Constanța County
- Villages: Gârlița

Physical characteristics
- Mouth: Almălău
  - coordinates: 44.0743°N 27.4581°E
- Length: 12 km (7.5 mi)
- Basin size: 48 km^{2} (19 sq mi)

Basin features
- Progression: Almălău→ Danube→ Black Sea
- Tributaries
  - left: Esechioi
- River code: XIV.1.37.1

The Ceair is a right tributary of the river Almălău in Romania. It discharges into Lake Bugeac in Gârlița. Its length is 12 km (7.5 mi) and its basin size is 48 km^{2} (19 sq mi).
