= Novi Pazar, Shumen Province =

Novi Pazar, Bulgaria
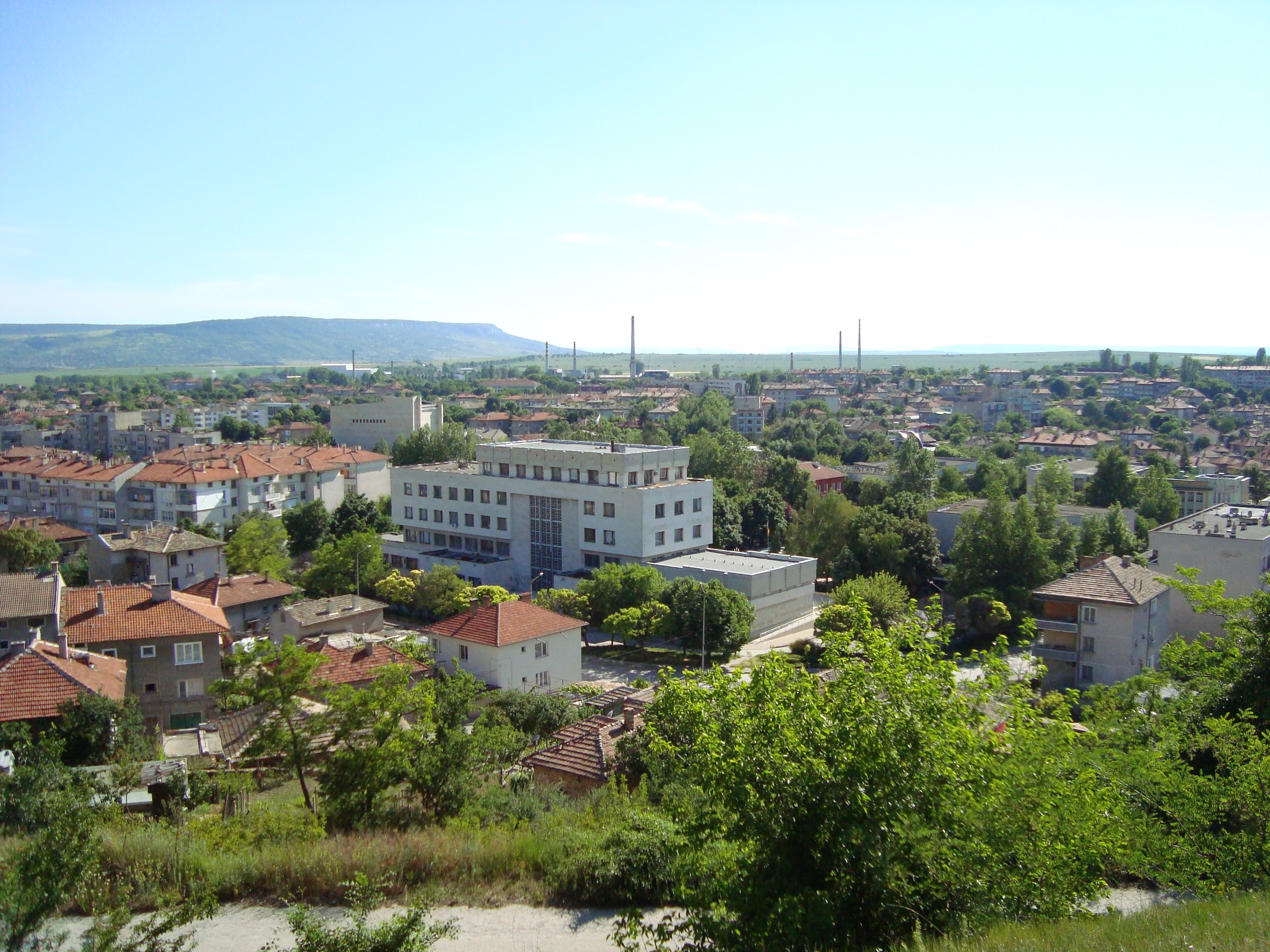
- Novi Pazar

- Location of Novi Pazar, Bulgaria
- Coordinates: 43°21′N 27°12′E
- Country: Bulgaria
- Province (Oblast): Shumen

Government
  - Mayor: Ivaylo Kamadzhiev
- Elevation: 156 m (512 ft)

Population (31.12.2009)
  - Total: 12,673
- Time zone: UTC+2 (EET)
  - Summer (DST): UTC+3 (EEST)
- Postal Code: 9900

Novi Pazar (Bulgarian: Нови пазар, "new marketplace") is a town in Shumen Province, northeastern Bulgaria, located in a hollow between the Shumen, Ludogorie and Provadiya plateaus, on the banks of the Kriva Reka ("twisting river"). It is the administrative centre of the homonymous Novi Pazar Municipality. As of December 2009, the town had a population of 12,673.

== History ==
The town may have been first mentioned in 1444 in a document by the German writer Michael Beheim before the Battle of Varna, although this is disputed. As part of the Ottoman Empire, Novi pazar (Yeni pazar) belonged to the Silistra sanjak and later the Pravadi kaza. It became a kaza centre in the 17th century and grew to become a rich and lively town in the 17th and 18th century. A new mosque was built in 1763, a hammam (bathhouse) in 1774 and a clock tower in 1826. During the Russo-Turkish Wars many Bulgarians from the region fled to Bessarabia and established the community of the Bessarabian Bulgarians.

A monastery school was founded in 1840 on the idea of Iliya Valchev and a chitalishte (cultural centre) followed in 1872. The town was liberated from Ottoman rule in the Russo-Turkish War of 1877-78, not being a site of significant fighting. It became part of the Principality of Bulgaria and many Turks fled to be replaced with Bulgarians from the ethnic Bulgarian lands that were left outside the country's borders of the time. Novi Pazar became a town in 1883.

Novi Pazar
Year	1887	1910	1934	1946	1956	1965	1975	1985	1992	2001	2005	2009	2011	2021
Population	no data	no data	no data	5,477	9,138	12,467	15,754	16,320	14,284	13,542	13,025	12,673	12,000	10,383
	Highest number ?? in ??													
Sources: National Statistical Institute, citypopulation.de, pop-stat.mashke.org, Bulgarian Academy of Sciences

== Twin towns – sister cities ==
Novi Pazar is twinned with:

- İnegöl, Turkey (2012)
- Novi Pazar, Serbia
