= Nikola Kozlevo =

Nikola Kozlevo Никола Козлево
- Location of Nikola Kozlevo
- Coordinates: 43°34′N 27°14′E
- Country: Bulgaria
- Provinces (Oblast): Shumen

Government
  - Mayor: Ismail Ibryam
- Elevation: 285 m (935 ft)

Population (2017)
  - Total: ▼785
- Time zone: UTC+2 (EET)
  - Summer (DST): UTC+3 (EEST)
- Postal Code: 9955
- Area code: 05328

Nikola Kozlevo (Bulgarian: Никола Козлево, pronounced [niˈkɔɫɐ ˈkɔzɫɛvo]) is a village in northeastern Bulgaria, part of Shumen Province. It is the administrative centre of Nikola Kozlevo Municipality, which lies in the northeastern part of Shumen Province, in the geographic region of Ludogorie. The village was named after the Bulgarian National Revival revolutionary and writer Nikola Kozlev (1824–1902).

== Population ==
According to the 2011 census, the village of Nikola Kozlevo has 802 inhabitants. The village has a mixed population. With 61% of its population, Bulgarians constitute the largest ethnic group. Romani people constitute 17% of the population, while ethnic Turks constitute 11%. Main religions are Orthodox Christianity and to a lesser extent Islam.
