= Kaspichan =

Kaspichan Каспичан
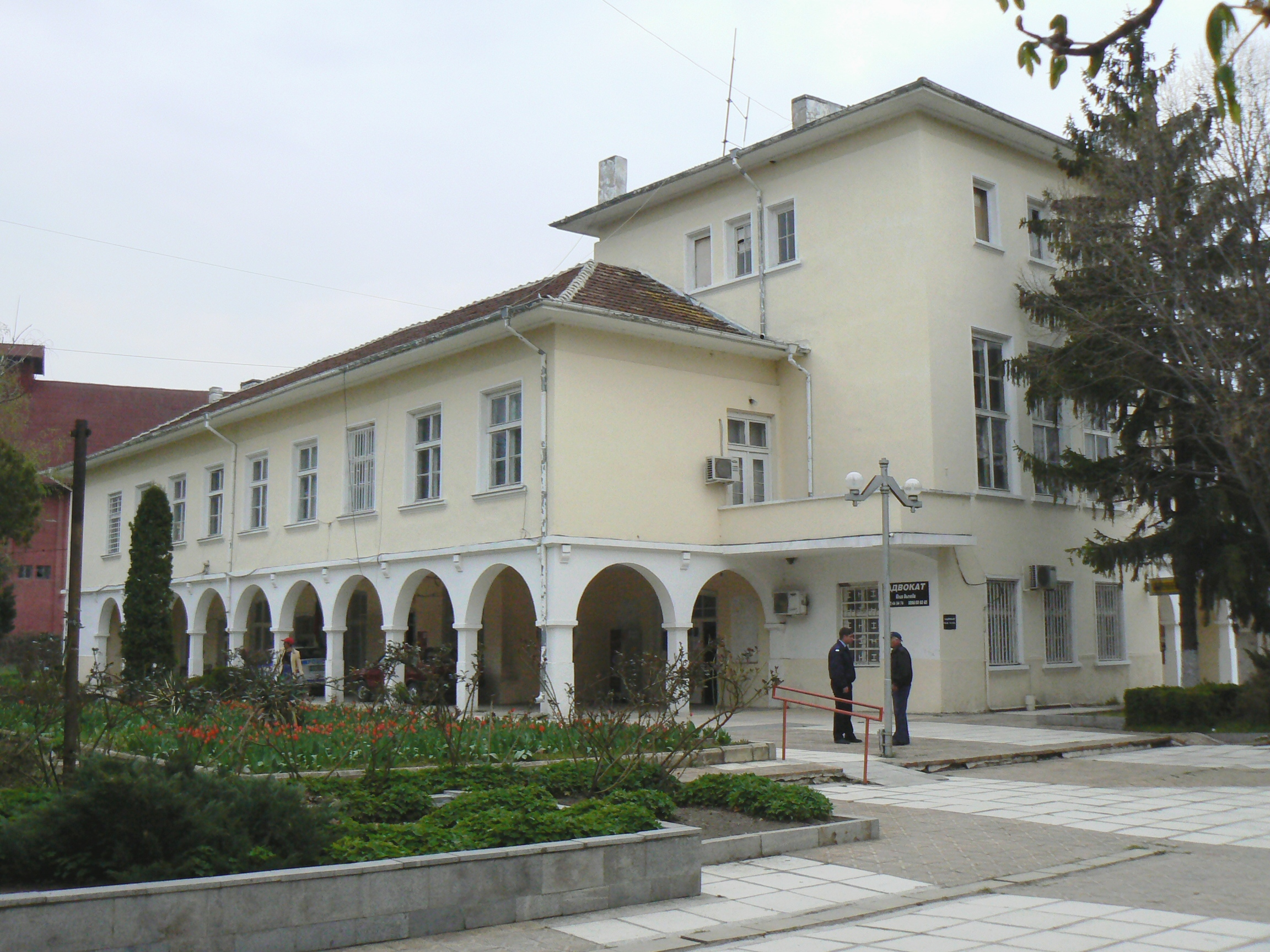
- Police station

- Location of Kaspichan
- Coordinates: 43°19′N 27°10′E
- Country: Bulgaria
- Provinces (Oblast): Shumen

Government
  - Mayor: Kondyo of Kaspichan (independent)
- Elevation: 106 m (348 ft)

Population (December 2009)
  - Total: 3,260
- Time zone: UTC+2 (EET)
  - Summer (DST): UTC+3 (EEST)
- Postal Code: 9930
- Area code: 05327
- License plate: H
- Website: http://www.kaspichan.org/]

Kaspichan (Bulgarian: Каспичан, pronounced [ˈkaspit͡ʃɐn]) is a town in central northeastern Bulgaria, part of Shumen Province. It is located in the eastern Danubian Plain, some 70 km (43 mi) from the major Black Sea port Varna and around 120 km (75 mi) from the key Danube ports of Ruse and Silistra. As of December 2009, the town had a population of 3,260.

Kaspichan is an important railway junction linking Varna with Sofia and Russe, Sofia both through a railway line and the Hemus motorway.

== Geography ==
Kaspichan Municipality is located in the central part of northeastern Bulgaria. It borders the municipalities of Shumen, Novi Pazar and Provadia.The administrative-territorial division includes nine settlements. It occupies an extremely important strategic position in northeastern Bulgaria. The town of Kaspichan is located 66 km from Varna and 120 km on average from the two major Danube ports of Ruse and Silistra. The railway station of the city is an important communication and transport hub in Northeastern Bulgaria. Located on the town's land is the village of the same name, which has no land of its own.

== History ==
According to the early 20th-century historian Vasil Mikov, the origin of the name of the settlement is narrow, as it is identical to the name of their tribal leader.

Kaspichan began its development as a market, and in 1866 as a railway station, Shumli, on the first railway line from Ruse–Varna. The infrastructural importance of the station for the region grew rapidly after the Liberation.

Evidence of holding rural-municipal elections in the region in 1896 has been preserved.

By Decree No. 546 of the Presidium of the National Assembly of September 7, 1964, Kaspichan was declared a city and in 1979 it became the center of a municipality.

== Municipality ==
Kaspichan is the administrative centre of Kaspichan municipality (part of Shumen Province), which includes the following nine places with a total population of 9,822 (as of 2005):

- Kaspichan
- Kaspichan (village)
- Kosovo
- Kyulevcha
- Markovo
- Mogila
- Pliska
- Varbyane
- Zlatna Niva

== Notable places ==
The cultural events are held in the cultural center, which unites Chitalishte "Awakening", the city library and the cinema.

The former pioneer home has been turned into a municipal children's complex.

The Orthodox Church of St. Panteleimon the Great Martyr is from the beginning of the 20th century.

In the village of Kaspichan is St. Elijah Eastern Orthodox Church, from the middle of the 19th century.

In the villages of Markovo and Kosovo are Eastern Orthodox churches from the middle of the 19th century.

In the neighborhood Kalugeritza is a unique Orthodox cemetery with huge crosses from the 15th and 16th centuries. In the area of Kireka above the village, the archaeologist Todor Balabanov discovered in the 1980s the remains of an early Christian monastery from the 4th century.

== Annual events ==
Every year in the town of Kaspichan are held various events (festivals, concerts, fairs, competitions, etc.) related to the "Days of my city", which in Kaspichan begin the last week of May. On July 2 every year Roca Bulgaria AD celebrates its holiday at Lokomotiv Stadium, Kaspichan.

== Honour ==
Kaspichan Point on Greenwich Island in the South Shetland Islands, Antarctica, is named after Kaspichan.

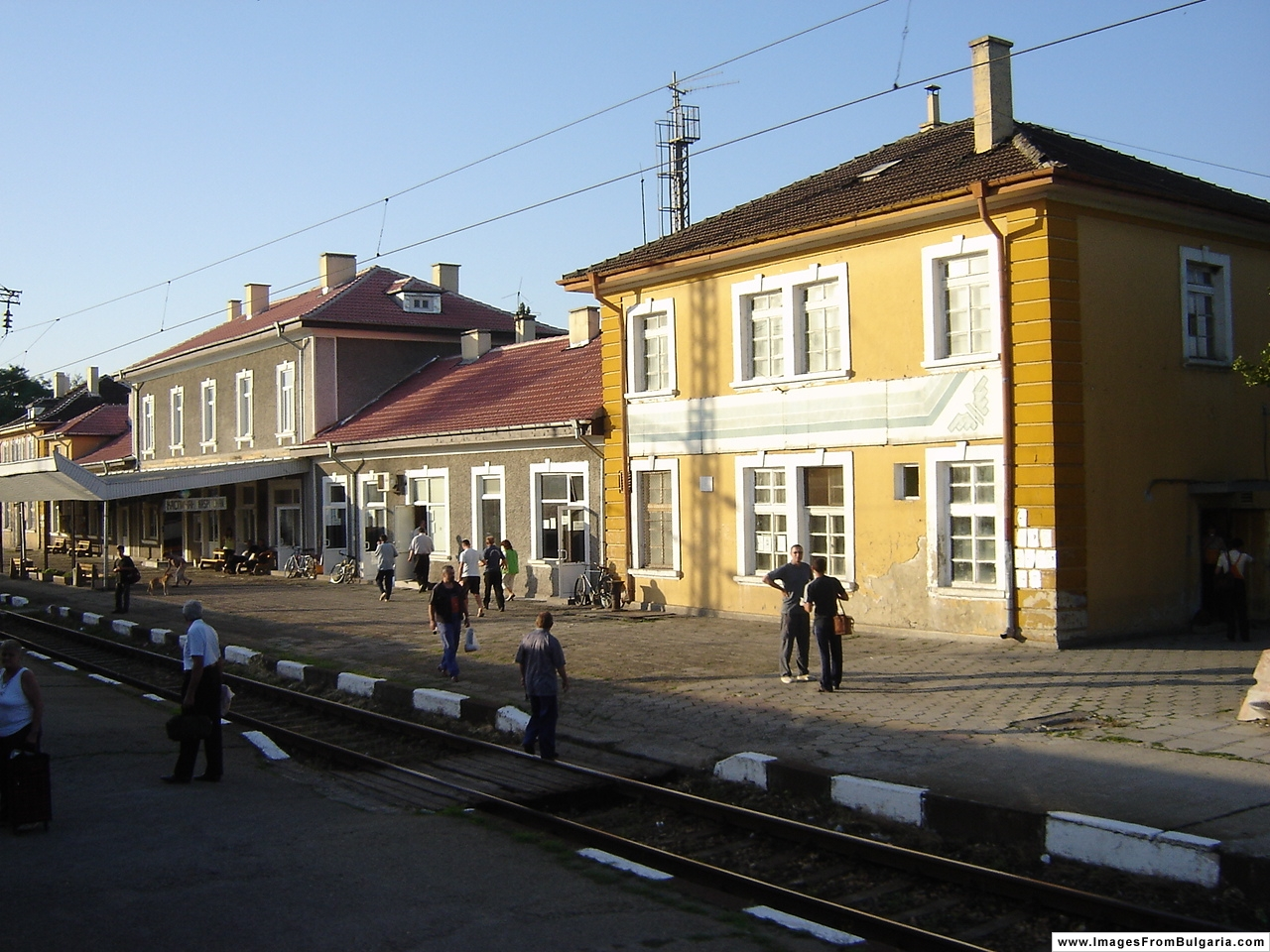
The Kaspichan railway station, an important junction in the Bulgarian northeast

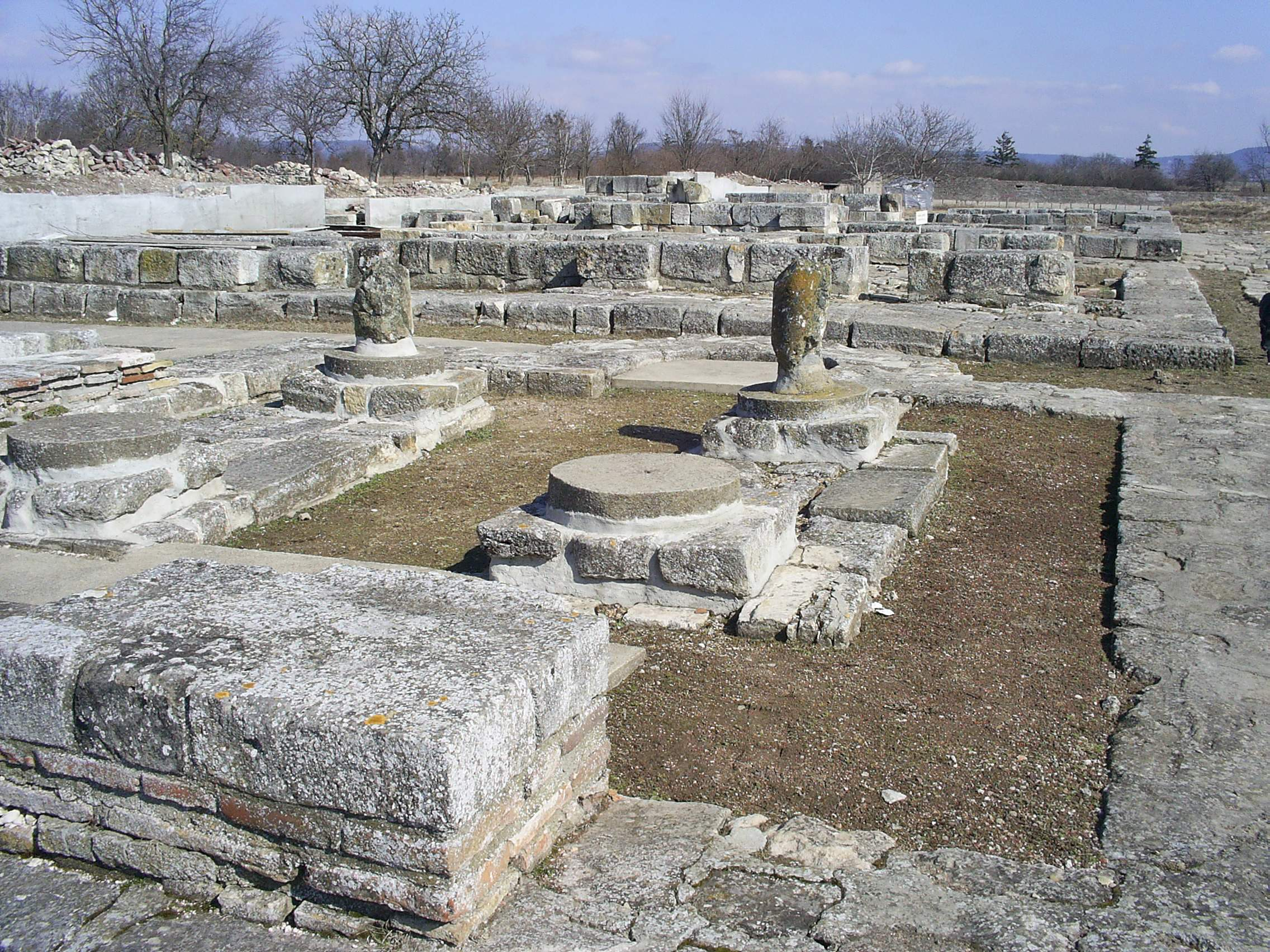
Ruins of the early medieval city of Pliska, the first Bulgarian capital

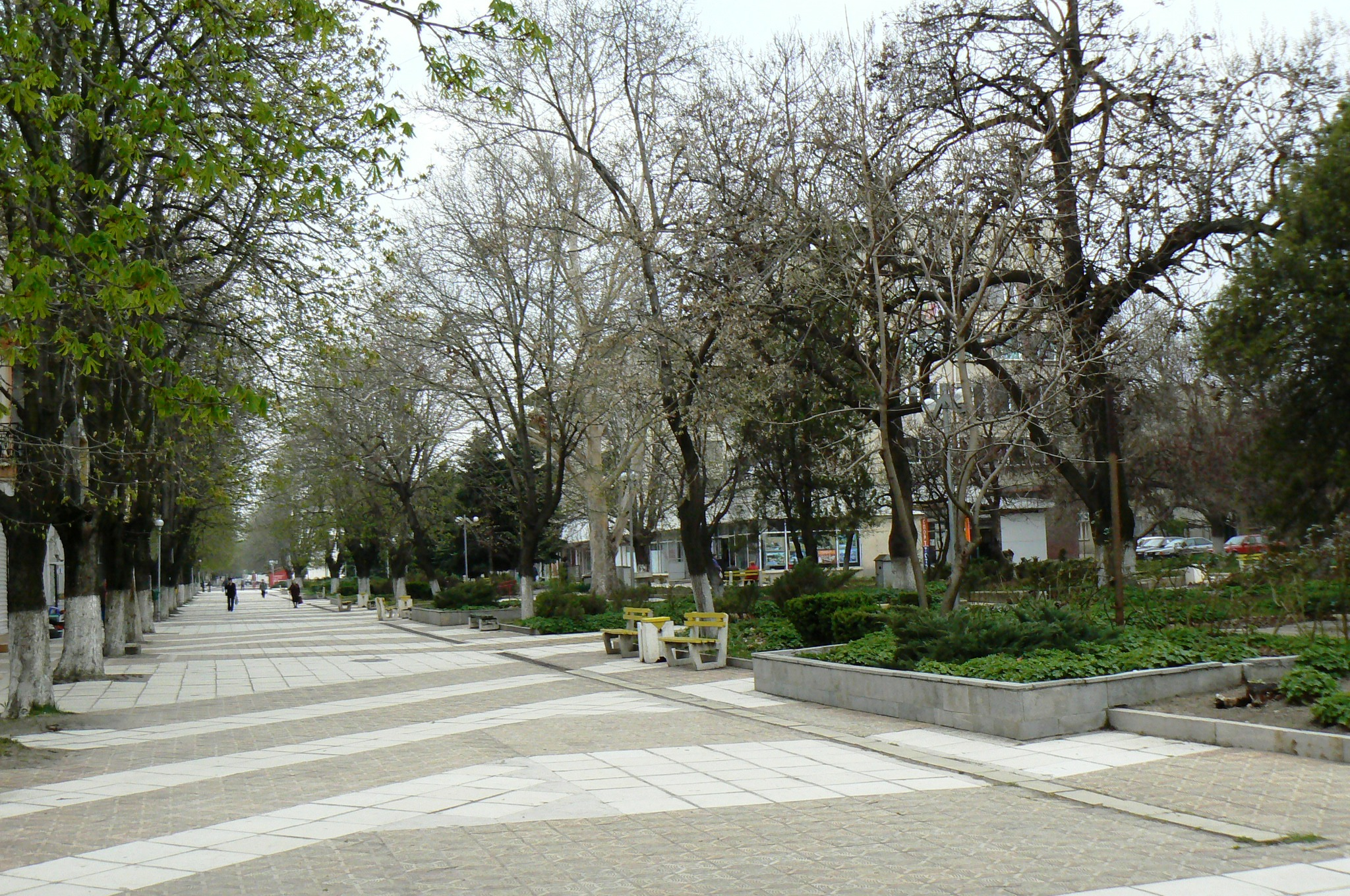
Central Kaspichan
