= Yankovo =

Yankovo Янково
- Location of Yankovo
- Coordinates: 43°05′N 27°07′E
- Country: Bulgaria
- Province (Oblast): Shumen

Government
  - Mayor: Tsanka Petrova
- Elevation: 80 m (260 ft)

Population (15 December 2009)
  - Total: 784
- Time zone: UTC+2 (EET)
  - Summer (DST): UTC+3 (EEST)
- Postal Code: 9823
- Area code: 05352

Yankovo (Bulgarian: Янково) is a village in Eastern Bulgaria, part of the Smyadovo municipality of Shumen Province. It is located on the Kamchiya river.

Yankovo has an area of 34.535 km^{2}. The village is 9 km away from Smyadovo, the closest settlement is Byal Bryag across the Kamchiya.
