= Rish =

Village in Bulgaria

Coordinates: 42°59′N 26°55′E

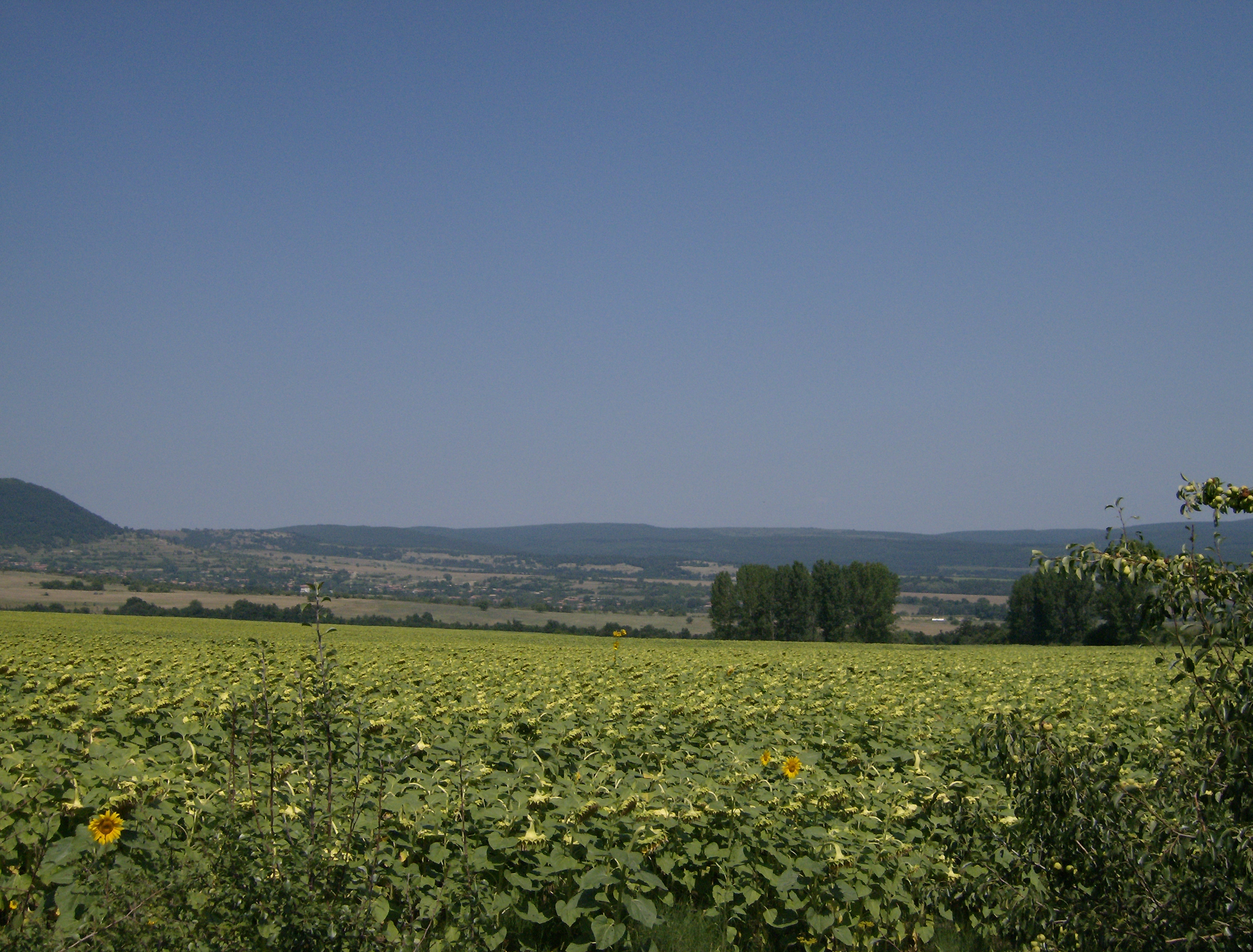
A picture of Rish taken at the Rish Pass

Rish (Bulgarian: Риш Riš) is a village in Smyadovo Municipality, Shumen Province, Bulgaria, with a population of 6931 as of 2024.

== Population ==
According to the 2011 Census, the population of Rish consists mainly of Bulgarian Turks (72.6%), followed by a Bulgarian minority (28.9%).

The population is gradually decreasing after the end of the Second World War.
