= Ostrov, Constanța =

Ostrov
- Commune
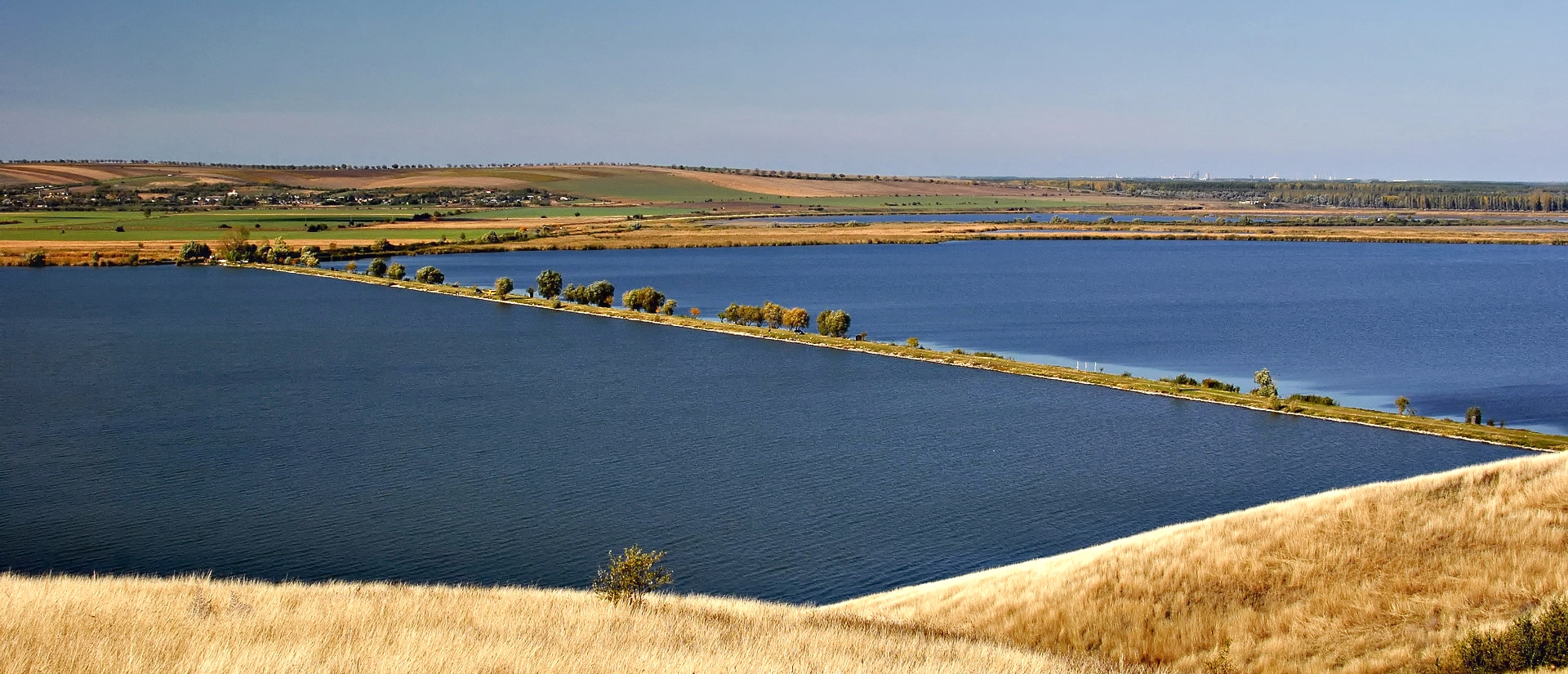
- Lake Bugeac

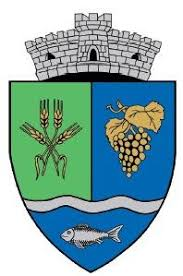
- Coat of arms

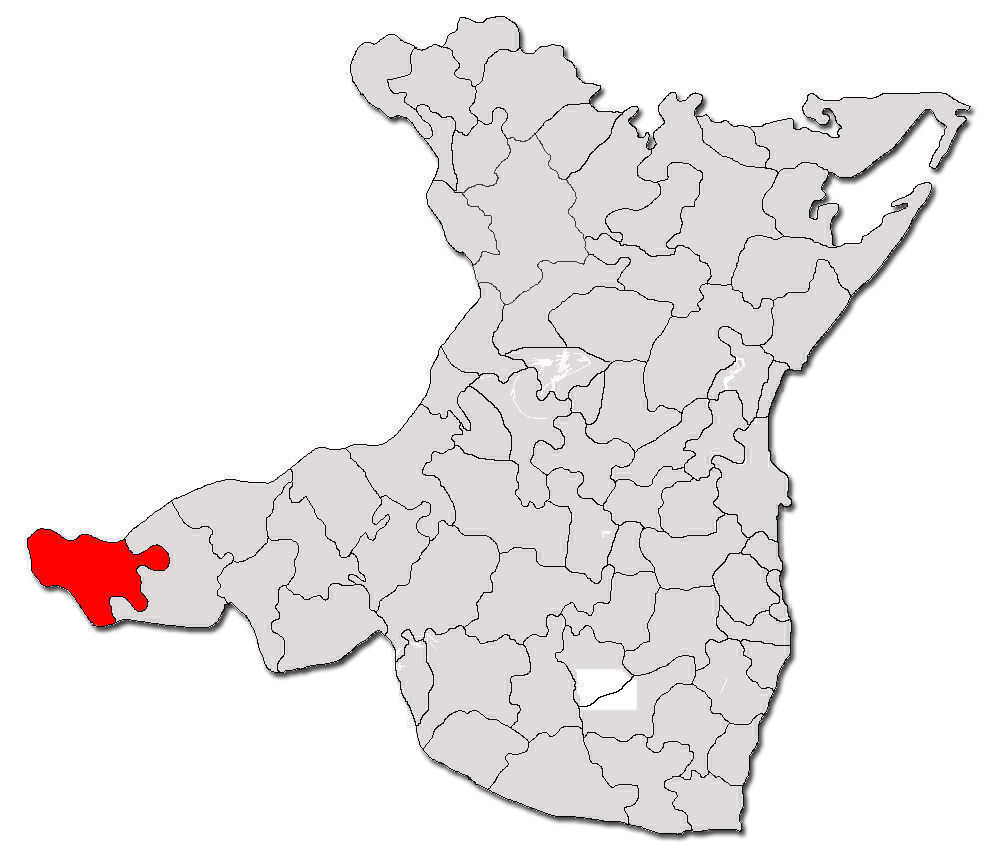
- Location in Constanța County

- Location in Romania
- Coordinates: 44°6′33″N 27°21′50″E
- Country: Romania
- County: Constanța
- Subdivisions: Ostrov, Almălău, Bugeac, Esechioi, Galița, Gârlița

Government
  - Mayor (2020–2024): Niculae Dragomir (PSD)
- Area: 171.30 km^{2} (66.14 sq mi)
- Elevation: 28 m (92 ft)
- Population (2021-12-01): 4,586
  - Density: 26.77/km^{2} (69.34/sq mi)
- Time zone: UTC+02:00 (EET)
  - Summer (DST): UTC+03:00 (EEST)
- Postal code: 907220
- Area code: +(40) 241
- Vehicle reg.: CT
- Website: www.primariaostrov.ro

Ostrov (Romanian pronunciation: [osˈtrov]) is a commune in Constanța County, Northern Dobruja, Romania. The locality was a town until 1950.

== Name ==
The name Ostrov is a word of Bulgarian origin and it means "island". The village itself is not located on an island, but rather on the banks of the Danube.

== Villages ==
The commune includes six villages:

- Ostrov
- Almălău (historical name: Almaliul, Turkish: Almalı)
- Bugeac (Turkish: Bucak)
- Esechioi (Turkish: Eşeköy)
- Galița
- Gârlița

== Geography ==
Ostrov is close to the Bulgarian border, with a border crossing linking it to the Bulgarian city of Silistra. Lake Bugeac is located within the territory of the commune, in a calcareous depression near the Danube, the water exchange with the latter being regulated by a weir. The river Almălău passes through Lake Bugeac and flows into the Danube near Galița; its right tributary, the river Ceair, discharges into the lake in Gârlița.

== Demographics ==
Historical population
Year	Pop.	±%
2002	5,599	—
2011	5,069	−9.5%
2021	4,586	−9.5%
Source: Census data

At the 2011 census, Ostrov had 5,069 inhabitants, of which 4,730 were Romanians (95.54%), 187 Roma (3.78%), 30 Turks (0.61%), and 4 others (0.08%). At the 2021 census, the commune had a population of 4,586; of those, 94.74% were Romanians.

== Natives ==
- Traian Cocorăscu (1888–1970), brigadier-general during World War II
- Ionuț Țenea (born 1996), footballer

== Păcuiul lui Soare ==
Păcuiul lui Soare is the name of a fortress on an island close to Ostrov. The ruins from the beginning of 8th century belong to the "Glorious Palace" of the First Bulgarian Khans on Danube and main base of the Bulgarian Danube fleet, as researchers suppose. They found many Protobulgarian marks graved in the blocks of the stone masonry of fortress that build pretty similar to the imperial capital Pliska. The stone graving text from the "Holy 40 martyrs column" found in Tarnovo indicate that the Great Khan Omurtag (?-831) built, maybe over Byzantine ruins, the medieval port and palace complex.
