= Traian Cocorăscu =

Romanian general

Traian Cocorăscu (15 February 1888 – 11 October 1970) was a Romanian brigadier-general during World War II.

He was born in Ostrov, Constanța County, and attended the Infantry and Cavalry Military School from 1907 to 1909, graduating with the rank of second lieutenant.

From January 1941 to March 1942 he was the Commanding Officer of the 9th Cavalry Brigade. In May 1941 he was awarded the Order of the Crown, Commander rank. After Romania entered the war on the side of the Axis, Cocorăscu participated in the Siege of Odessa (1941). He then served as the General Officer Commanding Cavalry Corps from March to October 1942, tasked with insuring security in the northern part of the Transnistria Governorate. He retired in 1942, and died in Bucharest in 1970, age 82.
