= Varbitsa Municipality =

Varbitsa Municipality Община Върбица
- Municipality
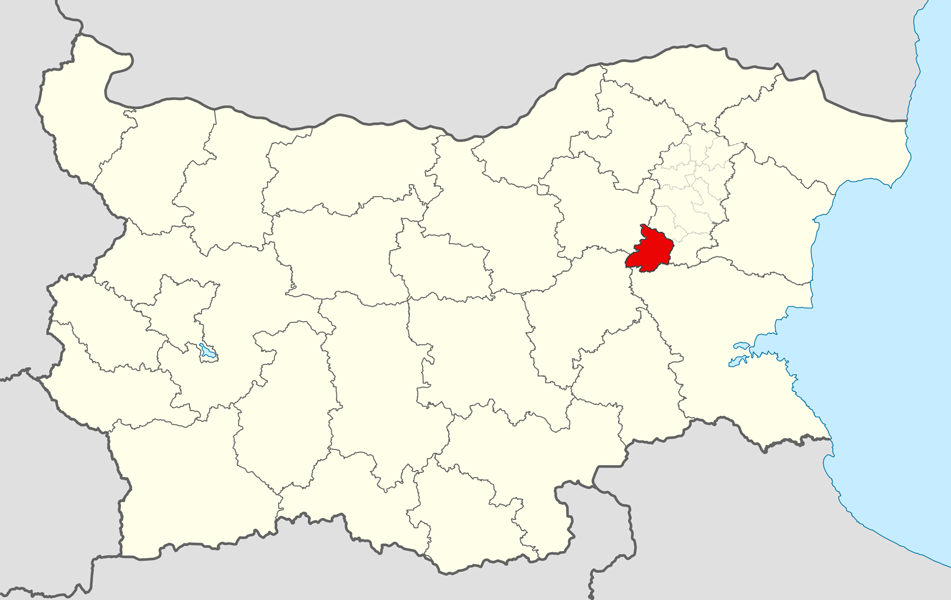
- Varbitsa Municipality within Bulgaria and Shumen Province.
- Coordinates: 43°0′N 26°43′E
- Country: Bulgaria
- Province (Oblast): Shumen
- Admin. centre (Obshtinski tsentar): Varbitsa

Area
  - Total: 419.36 km^{2} (161.92 sq mi)

Population (December 2009)
  - Total: 10,492
  - Density: 25.019/km^{2} (64.799/sq mi)
- Time zone: UTC+2 (EET)
  - Summer (DST): UTC+3 (EEST)

Varbitsa Municipality (Bulgarian: Община Върбица) is a municipality (obshtina) in Shumen Province, Northeastern Bulgaria, located in the vicinity of the northern slopes of the Eastern Stara planina mountain to the area of the so-called Fore-Balkan. It is named after its administrative centre - the town of Varbitsa.

The municipality embraces a territory of 419.36 km^{2} (161.92 sq mi) with a population of 10,492 inhabitants, as of December 2009. The area contains the Ticha Reservoir - one of the biggest in the country, developed along the Kamchiya river. It is the reservoir with the largest perimeter in Bulgaria.

== Settlements ==
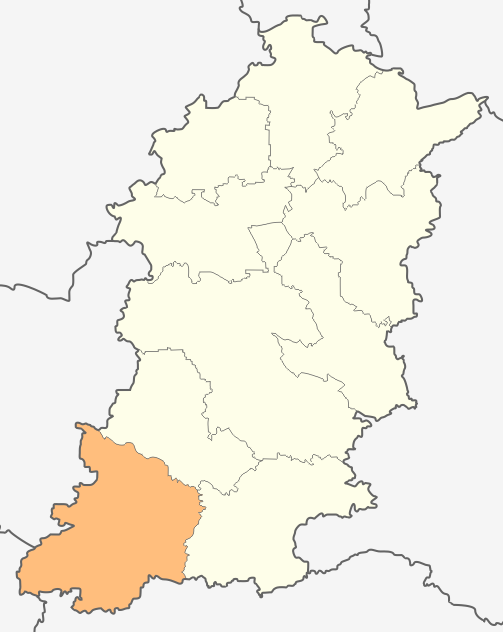
Varbitsa Municipality within Shumen Province

Varbitsa Municipality includes the following 16 places (towns are shown in bold):

Town/Village	Cyrillic	Population (December 2009)
**Varbitsa**	**Върбица**	3,585
Byala Reka	Бяла река	1,162
Bozhurovo	Божурово	243
Chernookovo	Чернооково	547
Ivanovo	Иваново	453
Konevo	Конево	247
Kraygortsi	Крайгорци	209
Kyolmen	Кьолмен	84
Lovets	Ловец	392
Malomir	Маломир	510
Mengishevo	Менгишево	449
Metodievo	Методиево	393
Nova Byala Reka	Нова Бяла река	520
Stanyantsi	Станянци	546
Sushina	Сушина	308
Tushovitsa	Тушовица	844
Total		10,492

== Demography ==
The following table shows the change of the population during the last four decades.

Varbitsa Municipality
**Year**	1975	1985	1992	**2001**	2005	2007	2009	**2011**
**Population**	14,116	13,648	11,841	11,249	10,861	10,658	10,492	10,391
Sources: Census 2001, Census 2011, „pop-stat.mashke.org“,

=== Ethnic composition ===
According to the 2011 census, among those who answered the optional question on ethnic identification, the ethnic composition of the municipality was the following:

Ethnic group	Population	Percentage
Bulgarians	919	9.3%
Turks	5597	56.9%
Roma (Gypsy)	2434	24.7%
Other	675	6.9%
Undeclared	220	2.2%

==== Religion ====
According to the latest Bulgarian census of 2011, the religious composition, among those who answered the optional question on religious identification, was the following:

Religious composition of Varbitsa Municipality
Orthodox Christianity	8.4%
Catholicism	0.1%
Protestantism	6.1%
Islam	74.5%
No religion	1.0%
Prefer not to answer, others and indefinable	9.9%

== See also ==
- Provinces of Bulgaria
- Municipalities of Bulgaria
- List of cities and towns in Bulgaria
