= Bozhurovo, Shumen Province =

Bozhurovo
- Location in Bulgaria
- Coordinates: 43°0′0″N 26°37′1″E
- Country: Bulgaria
- Province: Shumen Province
- Municipality: Varbitsa

Area
  - Total: 3.857 sq mi (9.989 km^{2})

Population (2007)
  - Total: 259
- Time zone: UTC+2 (EET)

Bozhurovo or Bojurovo (Bulgarian: Божурово) is a village in the municipality of Varbitsa, located in the Shumen Province of northeastern Bulgaria. The village covers an area of 9,989 square kilometres (3,857 sq mi) and is located 271,324 kilometres (168,593 mi) from Sofia. As of 2007, the village had a population of 259 people.
