= Almălău =

- Location within Romania

Location
- Country: Romania
- Counties: Constanța County
- Villages: Almălău, Bugeac

Physical characteristics
- Mouth: Danube
  - coordinates: 44.1160°N 27.4698°E
- Length: 20 km (12 mi)
- Basin size: 198 km^{2} (76 sq mi)

Basin features
- Progression: Danube→ Black Sea
- Tributaries
  - right: Kanagyol (Canora), Ceair, Galița
- River code: XIV.1.37

The Almălău is a right tributary of the Danube in Romania. It passes through Lake Bugeac and flows into the Danube near Galița. Its length is 20 km (12 mi) and its basin size is 198 km^{2} (76 sq mi).
