= Ivanovo, Shumen Province =

Ivanovo
- Location in Bulgaria
- Coordinates: 43°0′0″N 26°37′1″E
- Country: Bulgaria
- Province: Shumen Province
- Municipality: Varbitsa

Area
  - Total: 10.159 sq mi (26.311 km^{2})

Population (2007)
  - Total: 484
- Time zone: UTC+2 (EET)

Ivanovo (Bulgarian: Иваново) is a village in the municipality of Varbitsa, located in the Shumen Province of northeastern Bulgaria. The village covers an area of 26.311 square kilometres (10.159 sq mi) and is located 280.805 kilometres (174.484 mi) from Sofia. As of 2007, the village had a population of 484 people.
