= Konevo, Shumen Province =

Konevo
- Location in Bulgaria
- Coordinates: 43°3′0″N 26°40′59″E
- Country: Bulgaria
- Province: Shumen Province
- Municipality: Varbitsa

Area
  - Total: 3.783 sq mi (9.798 km^{2})

Population (2007)
  - Total: 261
- Time zone: UTC+2 (EET)

Konevo (Bulgarian: Конево) is a village that is located in the municipality of Varbitsa, Shumen Province, Bulgaria. The village covers an area of 9.798 square kilometres (3.783 sq mi) and is 277.312 kilometres (172.314 mi) from Sofia. As of 2007, the village had a population of 261 people.
