= Chernookovo, Shumen Province =

Chernookovo Karagozler
- Location in Bulgaria
- Coordinates: 43°0′0″N 26°37′1″E
- Country: Bulgaria
- Province: Shumen Province
- Municipality: Varbitsa

Area
  - Total: 5.660 sq mi (14.659 km^{2})

Population (2007)
  - Total: 562
- Time zone: UTC+2 (EET)

Chernookovo (Bulgarian: Чернооково) is a village in the municipality of Varbitsa, located in the Shumen Province of northeastern Bulgaria. The village covers an area of 14.659 square kilometres (5.660 sq mi) and is located 271.324 kilometres (168.593 mi) from Sofia. As of 2007, the village had a population of 562 people.
