= Venets Municipality =

Venets Municipality Община Венец (Veletler Turkish)
- Municipality
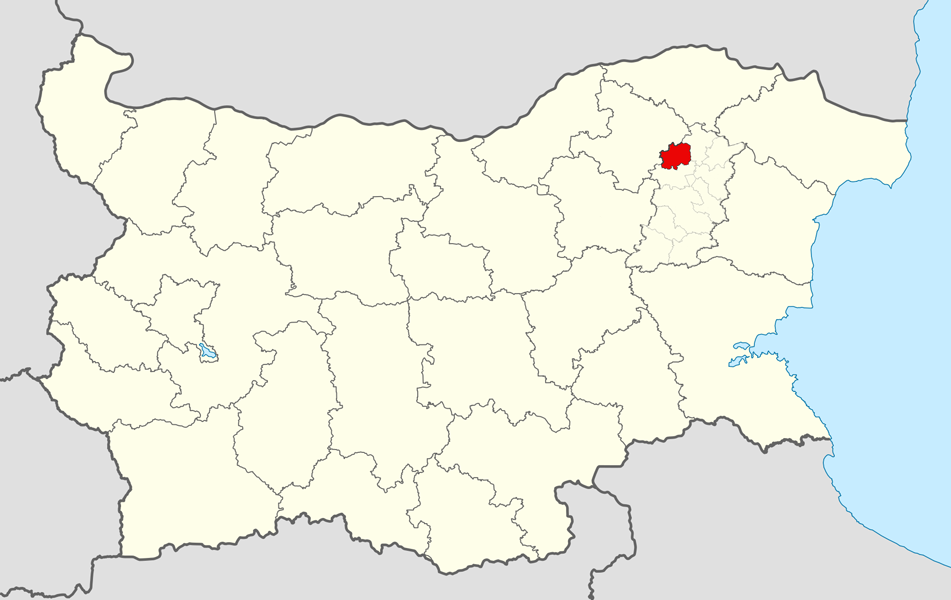
- Venets Municipality within Bulgaria and Shumen Province.
- Coordinates: 43°32′N 26°54′E
- Country: Bulgaria
- Province (Oblast): Shumen
- Admin. centre (Obshtinski tsentar): Venets

Area
  - Total: 222.56 km^{2} (85.93 sq mi)

Population (December 2009)
  - Total: 6,905
  - Density: 31.03/km^{2} (80.36/sq mi)
- Time zone: UTC+2 (EET)
  - Summer (DST): UTC+3 (EEST)

Venets Municipality (Bulgarian: Община Венец) is a municipality (obshtina) in Shumen Province, Northeastern Bulgaria, located in the Ludogorie geographical region, part of the Danubian Plain. It is named after its administrative centre - the village of Venets.

The municipality embraces a territory of 222.56 km^{2} (85.93 sq mi) with a population of 6,905 inhabitants, as of December 2009.

== Settlements ==
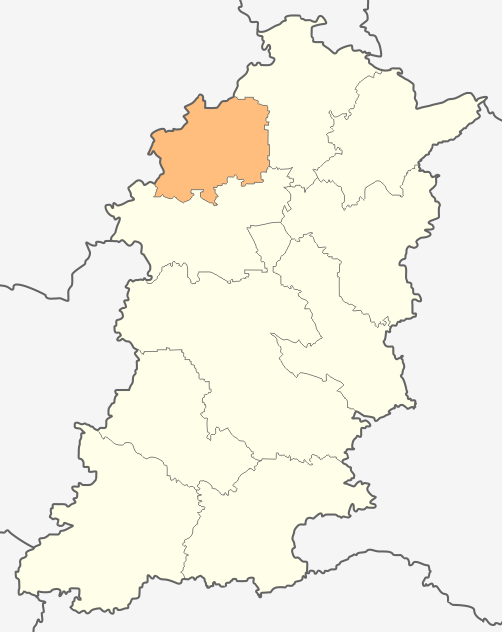
Venets Municipality within Shumen Province

Venets Municipality includes the following 13 places, all of them are villages:

Town/Village	Cyrillic	Population (December 2009)
Venets	Венец	725
Bortsi	Борци	540
Boyan	Боян	412
Buynovitsa	Буйновица	238
Chernoglavtsi	Черноглавци	471
Dennitsa	Денница	118
Drentsi	Дренци	314
Gabritsa	Габрица	441
Izgrev	Изгрев	744
Kapitan Petko	Капитан Петко	495
Osenovets	Осеновец	382
Strahilitsa	Страхилица	75
Yasenkovo	Ясенково	1,950
Total		6,905

== Demography ==
The following table shows the change of the population during the last four decades.

Venets Municipality
Year	1975	1985	1992	2001	2005	2007	2009	2011
Population	14,329	13,272	9,033	8,042	7,260	7,057	6,905	7137
Sources: Census 2001, Census 2011, „pop-stat.mashke.org“,

=== Ethnic composition ===
According to the 2011 census, among those who answered the optional question on ethnic identification, the ethnic composition of the municipality was the following:

Ethnic group	Population	Percentage
Bulgarians	122	1.9%
Turks	5707	89%
Roma (Gypsy)	506	7.9%
Other	3	0%
Undeclared	73	1.1%

The population is predominantly Turkish (89.0%), with Bulgarian (1.9%), Romani (7.9%) and other minorities (1.1%).

==== Religion ====
The municipality of Venets has the second highest share of Turks in Bulgaria with 89%, which makes it also the municipality with the second highest share of Muslims in Bulgaria, with 95% of its population belonging to the Islamic community. The small Bulgarian population is mostly Christian.

Population of Venets Municipality by religion
Eastern Orthodox	1.2%
Islam	95.1%
Others and indefinable	3.7%

== See also ==
- Provinces of Bulgaria
- Municipalities of Bulgaria
- List of cities and towns in Bulgaria
