= Battle of Pliska =

Battle between the Bulgarian Empire and the Byzantine Empire in 811

- Part of the Byzantine–Bulgarian wars
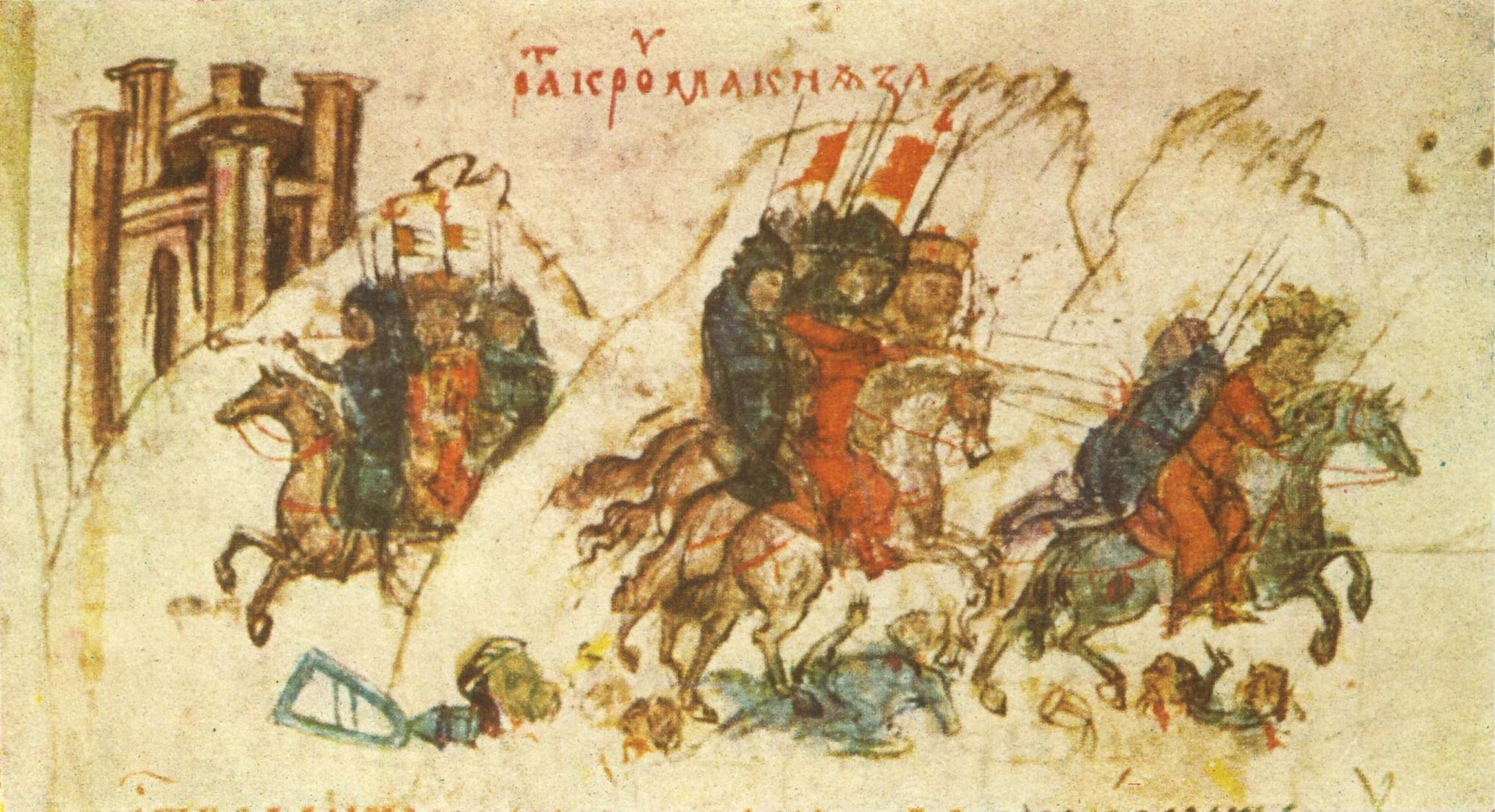
- The Battle of Pliska, depicted in the 14th century Manasses Chronicle.
Date	26 July 811
Location	Pliska and Vărbitsa Pass 43.387°N 27.132°E
Result	Bulgarian victory

Belligerents
Bulgarian Empire	Byzantine Empire

Commanders and leaders
Krum	Nikephoros I †; Stauracius (WIA)

Strength
15,000–18,000	22,000; 60,000–70,000 (paper strength); 25,000–30,000 (actual strength)

Casualties and losses
Unknown	Most of the army

The Battle of Pliska or Battle of Vărbitsa Pass was a series of battles between the forces of the Byzantine Empire under Emperor Nicephorus I, and the First Bulgarian Empire under Khan Krum in July 811. The Byzantines plundered and burned the Bulgar capital Pliska which gave time for the Bulgarians to block passes in the Balkan Mountains that served as exits out of Bulgaria. The final battle took place on 26 July 811, in some of the passes in the eastern part of the Balkans, most probably the Vărbitsa Pass. There, the Bulgarians used the tactics of ambush and surprise night attacks to effectively trap and immobilize the Byzantine army, thus annihilating almost the whole army, including the Emperor. After the battle, Krum encased the skull of Nicephorus in silver, and used it as a cup for drinking. This is one of the most documented instances of the custom of the skull cup.

The Battle of Pliska was one of the worst defeats in Byzantine history. It deterred Byzantine rulers from sending their troops north of the Balkans for more than 150 years afterwards, which increased the influence and spread of the Bulgarians to the west and south of the Balkan Peninsula, resulting in a great territorial enlargement of the First Bulgarian Empire.

== Initial campaigns ==
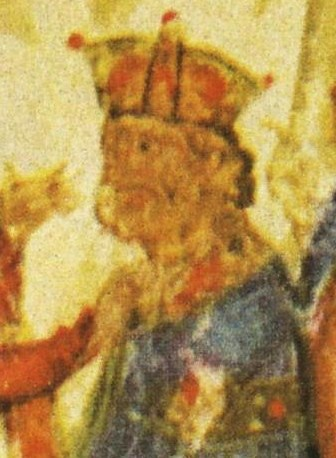
Nicephorus I.

When Nicephorus became emperor in 802, he planned to reincorporate Bulgar-held territory back into the empire. In 807 he launched a campaign but only reached Adrianople and achieved nothing because of a conspiracy in his capital. That attempted attack, however, gave reason for the Bulgar Khan, Krum, to undertake military operations against the Byzantine Empire. The main objective was an extension to the south and south-west. The next year, a Bulgar army penetrated the Struma Valley and defeated the Byzantines. The Bulgar troops captured 1,100 litres (roughly 332 to 348 kilograms) of gold and killed many enemy soldiers including all strategoi and most of the commanders. In 809, Krum personally besieged the fortress of Serdica and seized the city, killing the entire garrison of 6,000.

== Preparation for an invasion ==
In 811, Nicephorus organized a large force in an attempt to conquer Bulgaria once and for all. The army included forces from the Anatolian and European themata, and the Imperial Bodyguard (the tagmata). In addition, the army was joined by a number of irregular troops who expected a swift victory and the chance to plunder. The conquest was supposed to be easy, and many high-ranking officials and aristocrats accompanied Nicephorus, including his son Stauracius and his brother-in-law Michael I Rangabe. The entire army consisted of approximately 22,000 soldiers.

== Sack of Pliska ==
The army first assembled in May and by 10 July had established a camp at the fortress of Marcelae (present-day Karnobat) near the Bulgarian frontier. Nicephorus intended to confuse the Bulgarians, and over the next ten days, made several feigned attacks. Krum assessed the situation, estimated that he could not repulse an army of such size and offered peace, which Nicephorus haughtily rejected. Theophanes wrote that the Emperor "was deterred from his own ill thoughts and the suggestions of his advisors who were thinking like him." Some of his military chiefs considered the invasion of Bulgaria to be imprudent, but Nicephorus was confident of his ultimate success.

Nicephorus moved ahead, invaded the Bulgarian lands, and marched through the Balkan passes towards the capital of Pliska. On 20 July Nicephorus divided the army into three columns, each marching by a different route towards Pliska. They met little resistance. After three days the Byzantines reached Pliska, defended by 12,000 elite Bulgarian soldiers. The Byzantines defeated the Bulgarian defenders and an additional Bulgarian army of 15,000 which was hastily assembled. On 23 July, the Byzantines quickly entered the defenseless capital sacking the city and the surrounding countryside. Krum attempted once again to negotiate a peace. According to the historian Theophanes, Krum's proclamation stated, "Here you are, you have won. So take what you please and go with peace." Nicephorus, overconfident from his success, ignored him believing that all of Bulgaria could be conquered.

Michael the Syrian, patriarch of the Syrian Jacobites in the twelfth century, described in his Chronicle the brutalities and atrocities of Nicephorus's troops: "Nicephorus, emperor of the Romans, walked in the Bulgarians' land: he was victorious and killed a great number of them. He reached their capital, took it over, and devastated it. His savagery went to such a point that he had their small children brought out, tied to the ground, and crushed with millstones. The Byzantine soldiers looted and plundered; burnt down the unharvested fields, cut the tendons of the oxen, slaughtered sheep and pigs." The Emperor took over Krum's treasury, locked it and did not allow his troops to reach it.

== Battle ==
While Nicephorus and his army were busy plundering the Bulgarian capital, Krum mobilized his people (including women and Avar mercenaries) to set traps and ambushes in the mountain passes. The Hungarians also supported the Bulgarians in the effort against the Byzantines. Initially Nicephorus intended to march through Moesia and reach Serdica before returning to Constantinople but the news of these preparations for a battle changed his decision and he chose the shortest way to his capital. The overconfident Emperor neglected to scout ahead and on 25 July the Byzantine army entered the Vărbitsa Pass. The Byzantine cavalry, however, told Nicephorus that the road was barred with wooden walls and that Krum's forces watched from the surrounding heights. The Emperor became panicked by the situation and repeatedly stated to his companions, "Even if we have had wings we could not have escaped from peril." Before they could retreat, the Bulgars blocked the valley entrance.

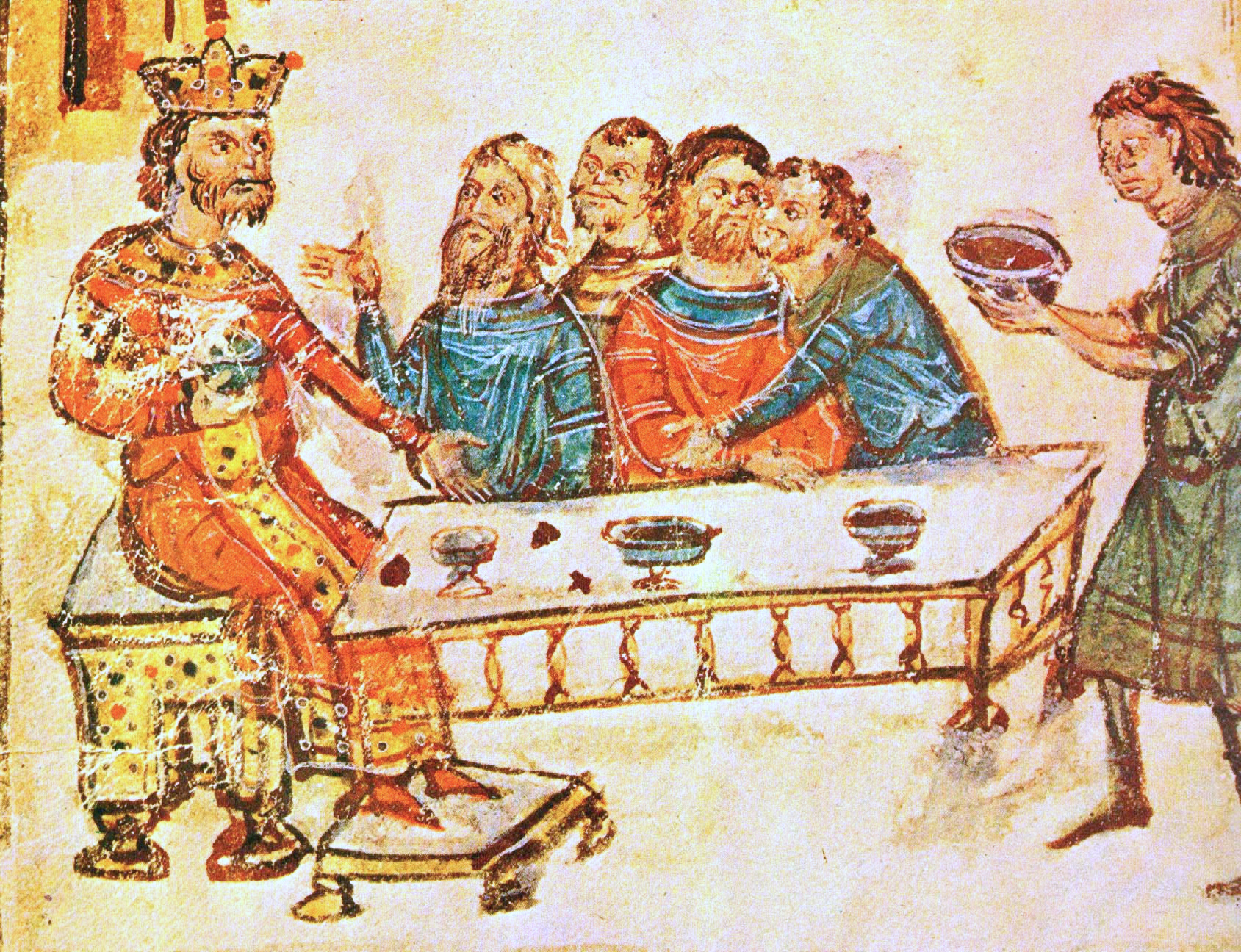
Bulgarian Khan Krum the Fearsome feasts with his nobles as a servant (right) brings him the skull of Nikephoros I, fashioned into a drinking cup, full of wine.

Nicephorus, unwilling to consider an assault on the palisades, simply set up camp, despite his generals' misgivings. From the heights, the Bulgarian archers began to rain down arrows upon the Byzantines in the valley below. After three days, the morale of the Byzantine troops was shattered. That evening, the Bulgarians assembled their troops and tightened the belt around their trapped enemy. At dawn, the Bulgarians rushed down the hills, killing the panicked and confused Byzantine troops. The Byzantine Imperial Bodyguard was the first to be attacked. The Byzantines fruitlessly resisted for a short time and perished. Upon seeing their comrades' fate, the other units broke and ran.

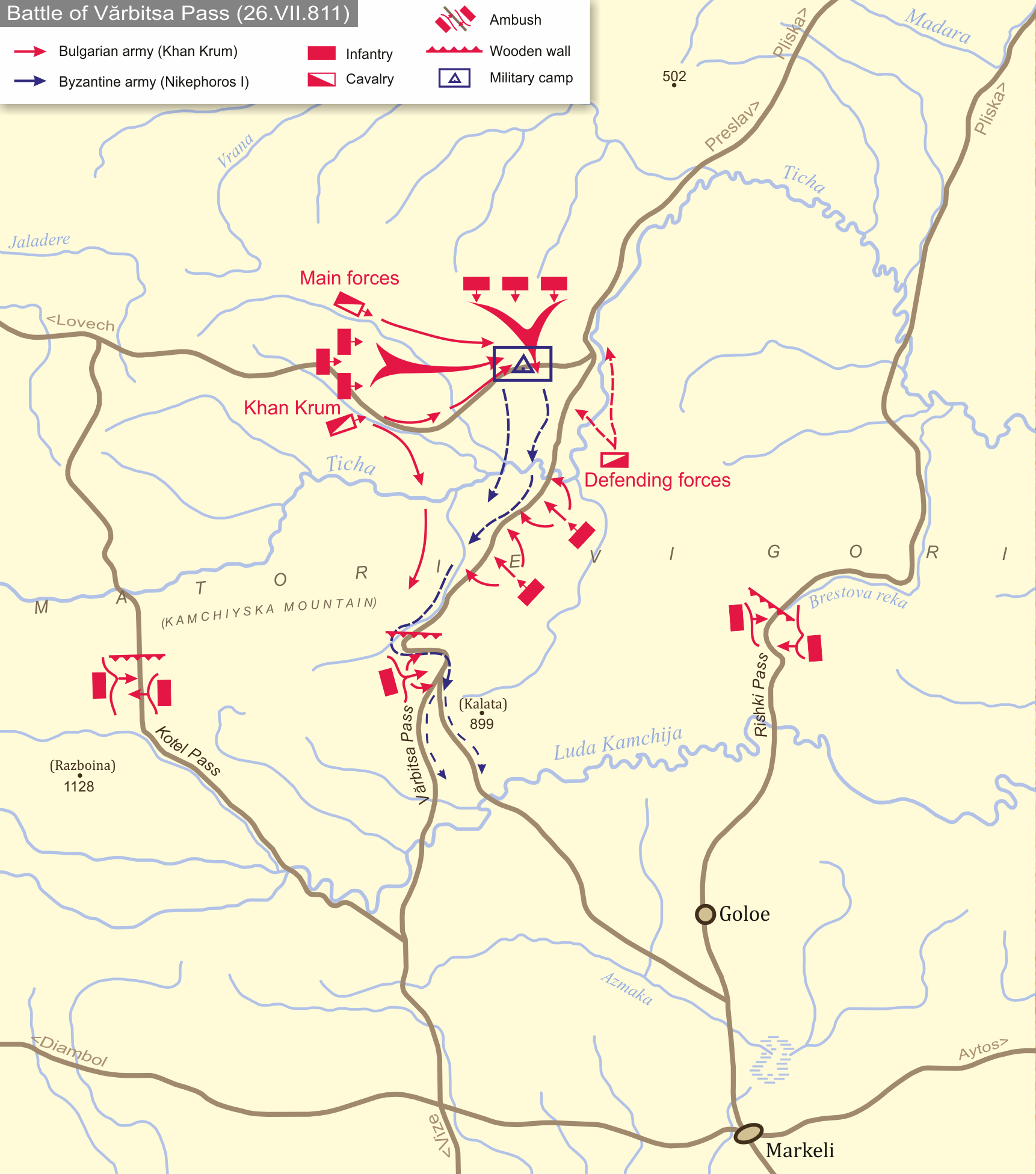
Battle at Varbitsa Pass (811)

As the Byzantines fled south, they came upon a muddy river that was difficult to cross. Unable to quickly ford the river, many of the Byzantines including mounted forces fell into the water and became stuck in the mud. As additional waves of panicked and fleeing soldiers arrived at the river, they trampled and killed many of their compatriots. The river became filled with so many dead that the pursuing Bulgarians easily passed over the dead and continued to hunt down and attack the Byzantines.

Those Byzantines who made it across the river were later confronted by high moated wooden walls constructed by the Bulgarians to impede the pathways to the south. The Byzantines attempted to climb over the wall and many were partially successful only to suffer injuries and death in the process. The Byzantines attempted to burn the walls but this tactic also proved ineffective and resulted in additional casualties. Almost all the fleeing Byzantines perished, some were killed by the sword; others drowned in the river; and many were mortally injured at the walls.

== Aftermath ==
Reportedly, few Byzantines survived the defeat. Among the nobles killed were the patricians Theodosios Salibaras and Sisinnios Triphyllios; the strategos of the Anatolics Romanos and the strategos of Thrace; as well as the commanders of the Excubitors and Vigla tagmata. The most notable person to be killed, however, was Emperor Nicephorus, who according to historians died on a dunghill on the day of the battle. Nicephorus's son, Stauracius, was carried to safety by the Imperial bodyguard after receiving a paralyzing wound to his neck. Six months later, his wounds eventually killed him. According to tradition, Krum had the Emperor's head put on a spike, lined the skull with silver, and used it as a drinking cup.

== General references ==
- Bury, J.-B. (1912). A History of the Eastern Roman Empire from the fall of Irene to the accession of Basil I (802–867). Macmillan & Co., Ltd., London. ISBN 1176683276.
- Fine, John V. A. Jr. (1991) [1983]. The Early Medieval Balkans: A Critical Survey from the Sixth to the Late Twelfth Century. Ann Arbor: University of Michigan Press. ISBN 0-472-08149-7.
- Hupchick, Dennis (2017). The Bulgarian-Byzantine Wars For Early Medieval Balkan Hegemony: Silver-Lined Skulls and Blinded Armies. Wilkes-Barre, US: Palgrave Macmillan. ISBN 978-3-319-56205-6.
- Jireček, K. J. (1876). Geschichte der Bulgaren (in German). Nachdr. d. Ausg. Prag 1876, Hildesheim, New York : Olms 1977. ISBN 3-487-06408-1.
- Runciman, Steven (1930). A History of the First Bulgarian Empire. G. Bell & Sons, London. Archived from the original on 13 December 2007 – via Questia.
- Sophoulis, Panos (2012). Byzantium and Bulgaria, 775–831. Leiden, The Netherlands: Brill. ISBN 978-90-04-20695-3.
- Zlatarski, Vasil N. (1918). Medieval History of the Bulgarian State, Vol I: History of the First Bulgarian Empire, Part I: Age of Hun-Bulgar Domination (679–852) (in Bulgarian). Sofia: Science and Arts Publishers, 2nd Edition (Petar Petrov, Ed.), Zahari Stoyanov Publishers, 4th ed., 2006. ISBN 954-739-928-4.
