= Nikola Kozlevo Municipality =

Nikola Kozlevo Municipality Община Никола Козлево
- Municipality
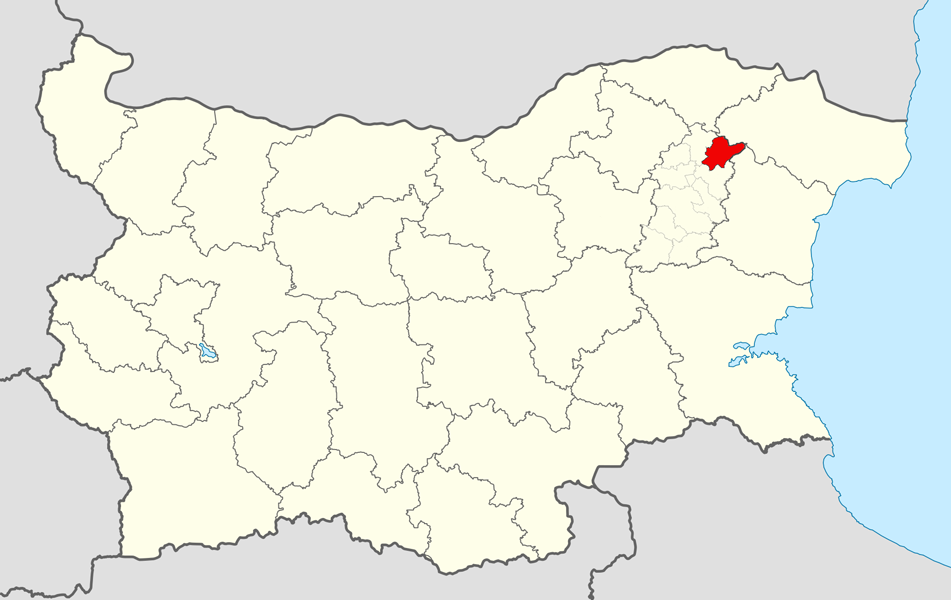
- Nikola Kozlevo Municipality within Bulgaria and Shumen Province.
- Coordinates: 43°32′N 27°12′E
- Country: Bulgaria
- Province (Oblast): Shumen
- Admin. centre (Obshtinski tsentar): Nikola Kozlevo

Area
  - Total: 265 km^{2} (102 sq mi)

Population (December 2009)
  - Total: 6,381
  - Density: 24.1/km^{2} (62.4/sq mi)
- Time zone: UTC+2 (EET)
  - Summer (DST): UTC+3 (EEST)

Nikola Kozlevo Municipality (Bulgarian: Община Никола Козлево) is a municipality (obshtina) in Shumen Province, Northeastern Bulgaria, located in the Ludogorie geographical region, part of the Danubian Plain. It is named after its administrative centre - the village of Nikola Kozlevo.

The municipality embraces a territory of 265 km^{2} (102 sq mi) with a population of 6,381 inhabitants, as of December 2009.

== Settlements ==
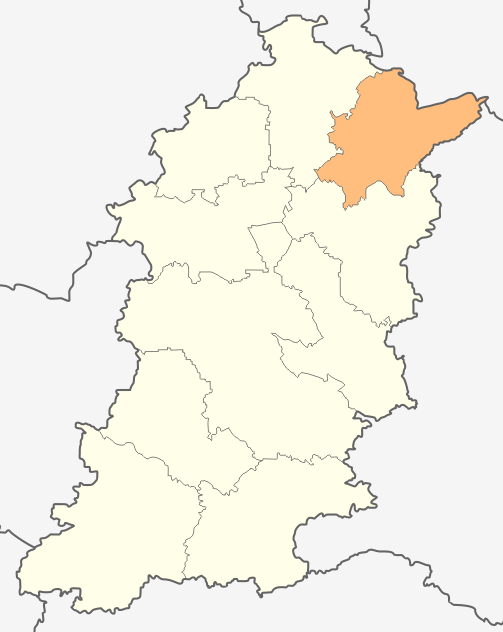
Nikola Kozlevo Municipality within Shumen Province

Nikola Kozlevo Municipality includes the following 11 places, all of them are villages:

Town/Village	Cyrillic	Population (December 2009)
Nikola Kozlevo	Никола Козлево	789
Harsovo	Хърсово	370
Karavelovo	Каравелово	357
Krasen Dol	Красен дол	143
Kriva Reka	Крива река	485
Pet Mogili	Пет могили	1,097
Ruzhitsa	Ружица	320
Tsani Ginchevo	Цани Гинчево	419
Tsarkvitsa	Църквица	629
Vekilski	Векилски	94
Valnari	Вълнари	1,678
Total		6,381

== Demography ==
The following table shows the change of the population during the last four decades.

Nikola Kozlevo Municipality
Year	1975	1985	1992	2001	2005	2007	2009	2011
Population	11,151	10,034	8,427	7,157	6,796	6,618	6,381	6,100
Sources: Census 2001, Census 2011, „pop-stat.mashke.org“,

=== Ethnic composition ===
According to the 2011 census, among those who answered the optional question on ethnic identification, the ethnic composition of the municipality was the following:

Ethnic group	Population	Percentage
Bulgarians	1299	22.9%
Turks	2883	50.8%
Roma (Gypsy)	1176	20.7%
Other	115	2%
Undeclared	199	3.5%

==== Vital statistics ====
	Population	Live births	Deaths	Natural growth	Birth rate (‰)	Death rate (‰)	Natural growth rate (‰)
2000	7,586	100	125	-25	13.2	16.5	-3.2
2001	7,018	96	113	-17	13.7	16.1	-2.4
2002	6,953	100	107	-7	14.4	15.4	-1.0
2003	6,955	84	116	-32	12.1	16.7	-4.6
2004	6,904	109	101	8	15.8	14.6	1.2
2005	6,796	76	112	-36	11.2	16.5	-5.3
2006	6,742	98	91	7	14.5	13.5	1.0
2007	6,618	103	117	-14	15.6	17.7	-2.1
2008	6,466	74	92	-18	11.4	14.2	-2.8
2009	6,381	92	94	-2	14.4	14.7	-0.3
2010	6,344	72	96	-24	11.3	15.1	-3.8
2011	6,130	85	92	-7	13.9	15.0	-1.1
2012	6,104	85	98	-13	13.9	16.1	-2.1
2013	6,093	76	75	1	12.5	12.3	0.2
2014	6,084	74	81	-7	12.2	13.3	-1.2
2015	6,130	61	93	-32	10.0	15.2	-5.2
2016	6,135	60	78	-18	9.8	12.7	2.9
2017	6,204	83	79	4	13.4	12.7	0.6
2018	6,236	80	83	-3	12.8	13.3	-0.5

==== Religion ====
According to the latest Bulgarian census of 2011, the religious composition, among those who answered the optional question on religious identification, was the following:

Religious composition of Nikola Kozlevo Municipality
Orthodox Christianity	25.1%
Catholicism	0.1%
Protestantism	0.1%
Islam	67.1%
No religion	1.1%
Prefer not to answer, others and indefinable	6.5%

Nearly all ethnic Turks are Muslim, while nearly all Bulgarians are Orthodox Christians. A majority of the Roma people are Muslim, with a large Christian minority.

== See also ==
- Provinces of Bulgaria
- Municipalities of Bulgaria
- List of cities and towns in Bulgaria
