= Venets, Shumen Province =

Venets Венец
- Location of Venets
- Coordinates: 43°33′N 26°56′E
- Country: Bulgaria
- Provinces (Oblast): Shumen

Government
  - Mayor: Ахмед Ахмедов

Population (2008)
  - Total: 978
- Time zone: UTC+2 (EET)
  - Summer (DST): UTC+3 (EEST)
- Postal Code: 9751
- Area code: 05343

Venets (Bulgarian: Венец, pronounced [vɛˈnɛt͡s]; also transliterated Venec or Venetz, meaning "wreath") is a village in northeastern Bulgaria, part of Shumen Province. It is the administrative centre of the homonymous Venets Municipality, which lies in the northwestern part of Shumen Province. The Venets Transmitter built in 1975 with the tallest radio mast in the country as well and the most powerful TV transmitter is located nearby.
