= Lake Bugeac =

Lake in Romania

Bugeac
- Location within Romania
- Location: Ostrov, Northern Dobruja, Romania
- Coordinates: 44°5′0″N 27°26′20″E
- Type: Fluvial Liman
- Primary inflows: River Almălău
- Primary outflows: River Danube
- Basin countries: Romania, Bulgaria
- Surface area: 14.82 km^{2} (5.72 sq mi)
- Surface elevation: 9 m (30 ft)

Lake Bugeac, also known as Lake Gârlița, is a lake in Northern Dobruja, Romania. It is located in a calcareous depression near the Danube, the water exchange with the latter being regulated by a weir.

Because the lake is an overwintering region located on an important migration route for aquatic birds (the most important being the Dalmatian pelican), Lake Buceag and the surrounding area have been declared a nature reserve.
