= Kosovo, Shumen Province =

Kosovo (Bulgarian: Косово) is a village in Shumen province, Bulgaria, located at 43°12′00″N 27°16′00″E. According to the 2011 Census, the village had 240 residents.
