= Varbitsa Pass =

Mountain pass in Bulgaria

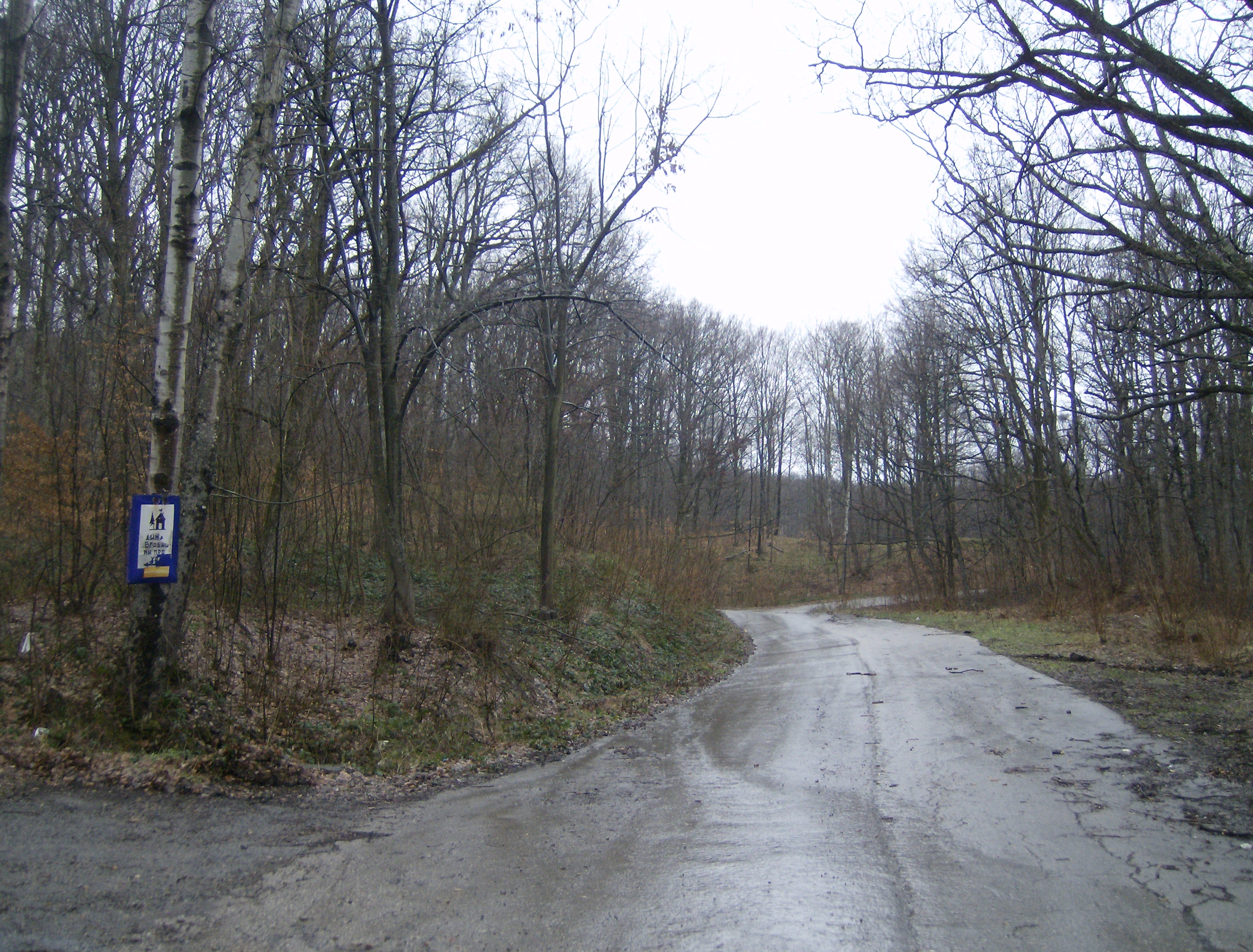
- Interactive map of Varbitsa Pass
- Elevation: 900 m (3,000 ft)
- Traversed by: Road

Location
- Location: Bulgaria
- Range: Balkan Mountains
- Coordinates: 42°55′39″N 26°40′6″E

Varbitsa Pass (Bulgarian: Върбишки проход [vɐrˈbiʃki ˈprɔxot]) is a mountain pass in the Balkan Mountains (Stara Planina) in Bulgaria. It connects Shumen and Petolachka crossroads.

The famous Battle of Pliska was fought in the pass on July 26, 811 between the armies of Bulgarian Empire led by Khan Krum and the Byzantine Empire under Nicephorus I which ended with a decisive Bulgarian victory and the death of the Byzantine Emperor.
