= Shumen Province =

Province in northeastern Bulgaria

Coordinates: 43°15′N 27°0′E

Shumen Province Област Шумен
- Province
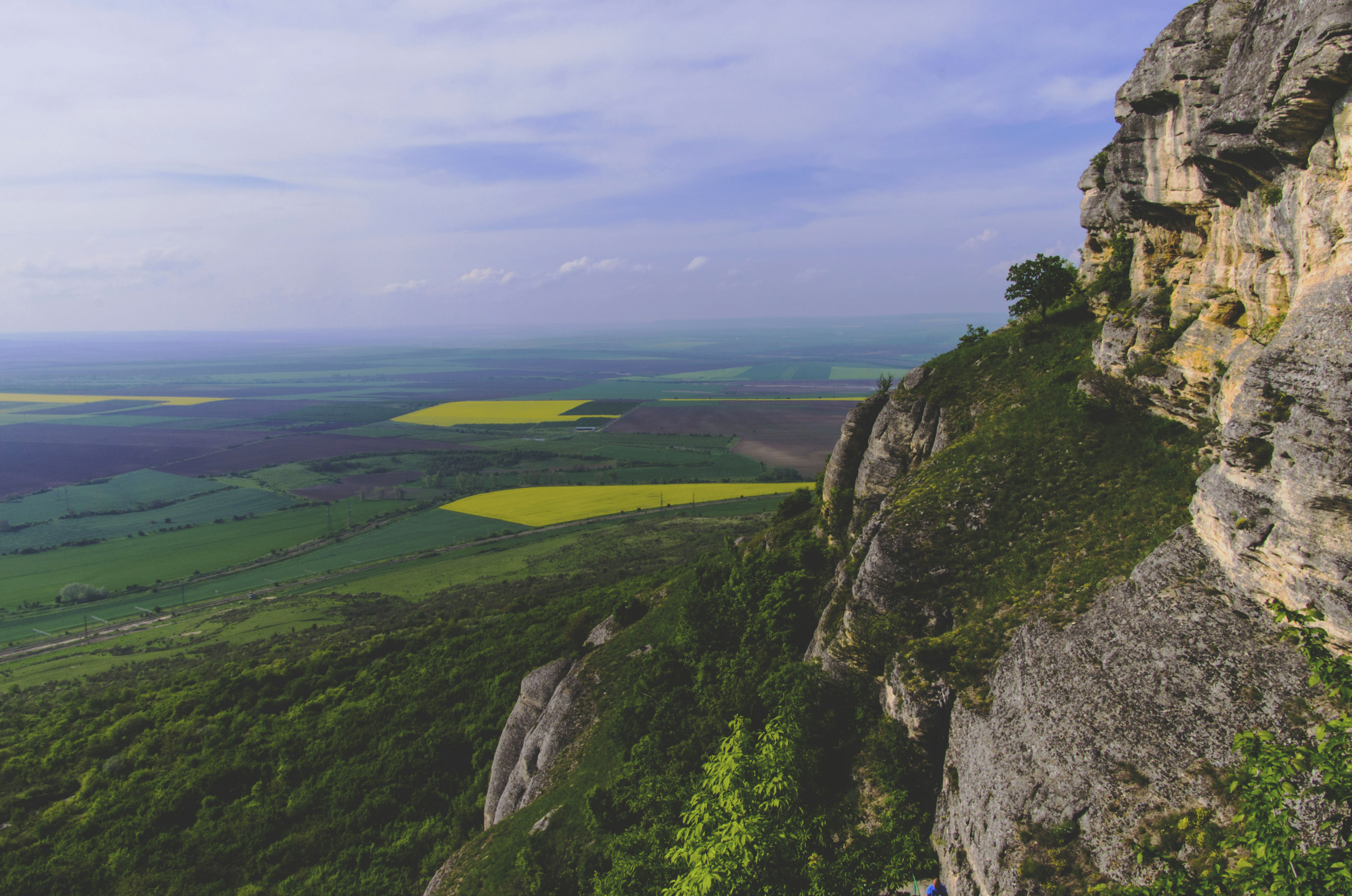
- Shumen Plateau

- Flag

- Location of Shumen Province in Bulgaria
- Country: Bulgaria
- Capital: Shumen
- Municipalities: 10

Government
  - Governor: Dobromir Dobrev

Area
  - Total: 3,389.7 km^{2} (1,308.8 sq mi)

Population (December 2022)
  - Total: 149,628
  - Density: 44.142/km^{2} (114.33/sq mi)
- Time zone: UTC+2 (EET)
  - Summer (DST): UTC+3 (EEST)
- License plate: H
- Website: shumenoblast.egov.bg

Shumen Province (Bulgarian: Област Шумен, transliterated Oblast Shumen, former name Shumen okrug) is a province in northeastern Bulgaria named after its main city Shumen. It is divided into ten municipalities with a total population, as of December 2009, of 194,090 inhabitants.

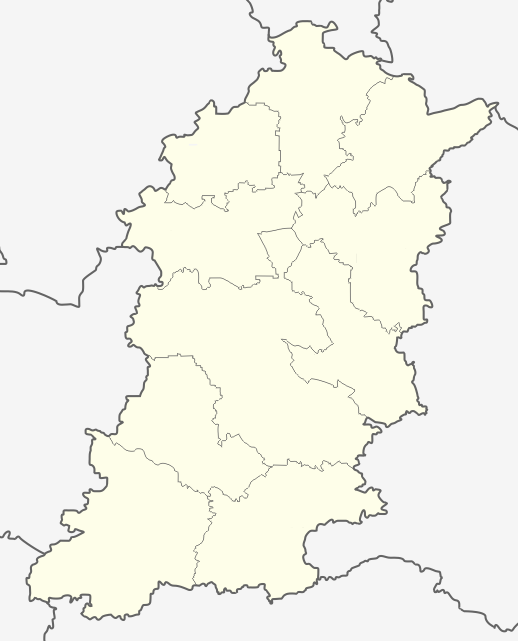

== The Main City ==
The city of Shumen is famous in the region for the Monument to 1300 Years of Bulgaria. The monument is in the cubist style and is 1300 steps (each step representing a year) above the center of the town. Other places of note are the Shumen fortress, Tombul Mosque, and Shumen Plato National park. The center of the town has a historical museum, large library, and large theater. The municipality building, also in the center, has a concert hall that features regular symphony performances. Shumen is also the location of the Shumensko Brewery, a popular beer in Bulgaria. The area surrounding Shumen plays a significant part in Bulgarian History with the first and second capitals of historical Bulgaria within thirty kilometers from the city.

== Municipalities ==
The Shumen Province contains 10 municipalities (singular: община, obshtina - plural: общини, obshtini). The following table shows each municipality's name in English and Cyrillic, main town (in bold) or village, and population as of December 2009.

Municipality	Cyrillic	Pop.	Town/Village	Pop. (December 2009)
Venets	Венец	6,905	Venets	725
Varbitsa	Върбица	10,492	**Varbitsa**	3,585
Hitrino	Хитрино	6,423	Hitrino	715
Kaolinovo	Каолиново	12,251	**Kaolinovo**	1,538
Kaspichan	Каспичан	8,871	**Kaspichan**	3,260
Nikola Kozlevo	Никола Козлево	6,381	Nikola Kozlevo	789
Novi Pazar	Нови Пазар	18,476	**Novi Pazar**	12,673
Veliki Preslav	Велики Преслав	15,292	**Veliki Preslav**	8,951
Smyadovo	Смядово	7,402	**Smyadovo**	4,036
Shumen	Шумен	101,597	**Shumen**	86,824

== Demographics ==
Historical population
Year	Pop.	±%
1946	222,141	—
1956	224,705	+1.2%
1965	243,416	+8.3%
1975	253,437	+4.1%
1985	254,884	+0.6%
1992	220,320	−13.6%
2001	204,378	−7.2%
2011	180,528	−11.7%
2021	151,465	−16.1%
Source: pop-stat.mashke.org

The Shumen province had a population of 204,395 (204,378 also given) according to a 2001 census, of which 48.8% were male and 51.2% were female.

As of the end of 2009, the population of the province, announced by the Bulgarian National Statistical Institute, numbered 194,090 of which 22.7% are inhabitants aged over 60 years.

=== Ethnic groups ===
Ethnic groups in Shumen Province (2011 census)
Ethnic group	Percentage
Bulgarians	59.2%
Turks	30.3%
Romani	8.2%
others and indefinable	2.3%

Total population (2011 census): 180,528

By self-identified ethnicity (167,952 people):

- Bulgarians: 99,446 (59.21%)
- Turks: 50,878 (30.29%)
- Romani: 13,847 (8.24%)
- Others and indefinable: 3,781 (2.25%)

A further 12,000 people did not declare their ethnic group.

Self-identified ethnic group according to the 2001 census (204,378 people out of the total population of 204,395, with percentage of total population):

- Bulgarians: 123,084 (60.22%)
- Turks: 59,551 (29.14%)
- Romani: 16,457 (8.05%)

=== Religion ===
Religions in Shumen Province (2001 census)
Religious group	Percentage
Orthodox Christian	59.1%
Muslim	35.5%
Protestant Christian	0.7%
Roman Catholic Christian	0.2%
others and indefinable	4.5%

Religious adherence in the province according to 2001 census:

Census 2001
religious adherence	population	%
Orthodox Christians	120,787	59.10%
Muslims	72,544	35.50%
Protestants	1,472	0.72%
Roman Catholics	386	0.19%
Other	821	0.40%
Religion not mentioned	8,368	4.09%
**total**	**204,378**	100%

== Transportation ==
Shumen lies on the main route between Varna and Sofia and is served by numerous trains and buses serving the city.

== See also ==
- Provinces of Bulgaria
- List of villages in Shumen Province
