= Municipalities of Bulgaria =

Administrative divisions of Bulgaria

Municipalities of Bulgaria общини на България (Bulgarian)
- Category: Unitary state
- Location: Republic of Bulgaria
- Found in: Provinces
- Number: 265
- Populations: 520 (Treklyano Municipality) – 1 295 931 (Sofia City)
- Areas: 44.39 km^{2} (17.14 sq mi) (Chelopech Municipality)– 1,366.63 km^{2} (527.66 sq mi) (Sliven Municipality)
- Government: Province government, National government
- Subdivisions: Village

The 28 provinces of Bulgaria are divided into 265 municipalities (община, obshtina). Municipalities typically comprise multiple towns, villages and settlements and are governed by a mayor who is elected by popular majority vote for a four-year term, and a municipal council which is elected using proportional representation for a four-year term. The creation of new municipalities requires that they must be created in a territory with a population of at least 6,000 and created around a designated settlement. They must also be named after the settlement that serves as the territory's administrative center, among other criteria.

The council of a municipality is further permitted to create administrative subdivisions: mayoralties (kmetstvo), settlements (naseleno myasto), and wards or quarters (rayon). Mayoralties are overseen by elected mayors and typically comprises one or more villages or towns; they must contain a population of at least 250. Settlements are overseen by a manager appointed by the mayor of a municipality and thus have fewer responsibilities and less power than a mayoralty; they must have a population of fewer than 150. Wards are overseen by elected mayors and must include a population of at least 25,000; their creation is required in Bulgaria's three most populous municipalities.

Like municipalities themselves, mayoralties and wards are designated administrative-territorial units, as they have their own elected officials. Settlements, however, are simply designated territorial units since their leaders are appointed.

== Blagoevgrad Province ==
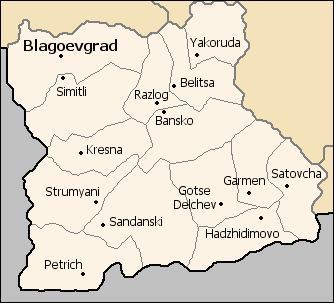
A map of the municipalities in Blagoevgrad Province

1. Bansko Municipality (main town: Bansko)
2. Belitsa Municipality (main town: Belitsa)
3. Blagoevgrad Municipality (main town: Blagoevgrad)
4. Garmen Municipality (main village: Garmen)
5. Gotse Delchev Municipality (main town: Gotse Delchev)
6. Hadzhidimovo Municipality (main town: Hadzhidimovo)
7. Kresna Municipality (main town: Kresna)
8. Petrich Municipality (main town: Petrich)
9. Razlog Municipality (main town: Razlog)
10. Sandanski Municipality (main town: Sandanski)
11. Satovcha Municipality (main village: Satovcha)
12. Simitli Municipality (main town: Simitli)
13. Strumyani Municipality (main village: Strumyani)
14. Yakoruda Municipality (main town: Yakoruda)

== Burgas Province ==
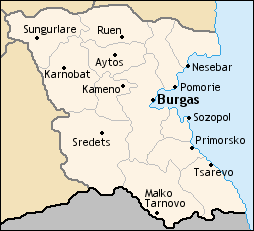
The municipalities of Burgas Province

1. Aytos Municipality (main town: Aytos)
2. Burgas Municipality (main town: Burgas)
3. Kameno Municipality (main town: Kameno)
4. Karnobat Municipality (main town: Karnobat)
5. Malko Tarnovo Municipality (main town: Malko Tarnovo)
6. Nesebar Municipality (main town: Nesebar)
7. Pomorie Municipality (main town: Pomorie)
8. Primorsko Municipality (main town: Primorsko)
9. Ruen Municipality (main village: Ruen)
10. Sozopol Municipality (main town: Sozopol)
11. Sredets Municipality (main town: Sredets)
12. Sungurlare Municipality (main town: Sungurlare)
13. Tsarevo Municipality (main town: Tsarevo)

== Dobrich Province ==
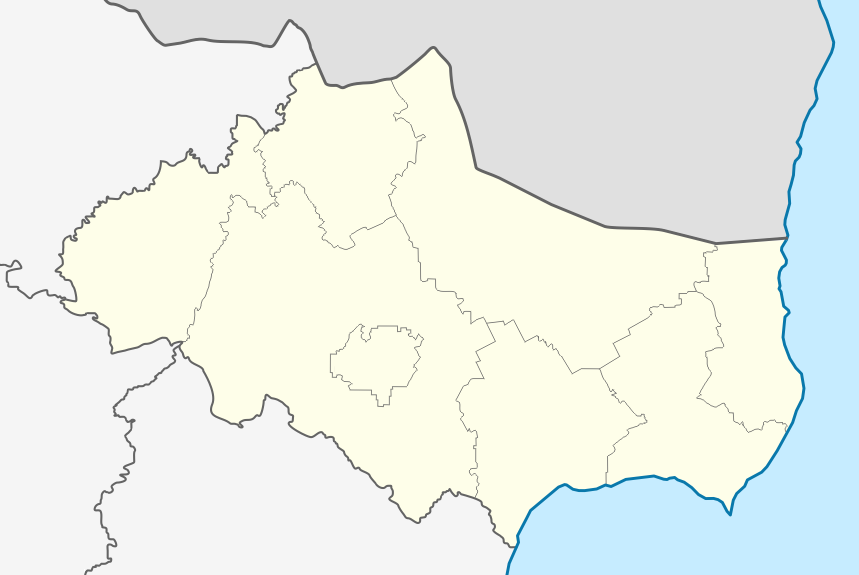
1. Balchik Municipality (main town: Balchik)
2. Dobrich Municipality (main town: Dobrich)
3. Dobrichka Municipality (administrative town: Dobrich)
4. General Toshevo Municipality (main town: General Toshevo)
5. Kavarna Municipality (main town: Kavarna)
6. Krushari Municipality (main village: Krushari)
7. Shabla Municipality (main town: Shabla)
8. Tervel Municipality (main town: Tervel)

== Gabrovo Province ==
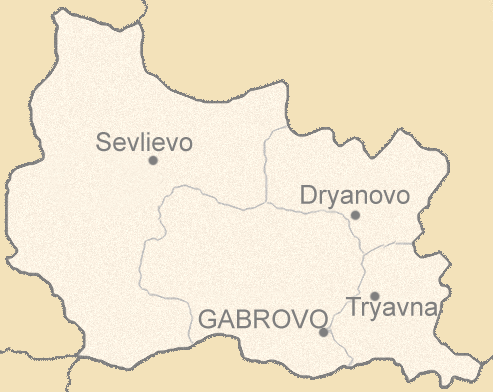
The municipalities of Gabrovo Province

1. Dryanovo Municipality (main town: Dryanovo)
2. Gabrovo Municipality (main town: Gabrovo)
3. Sevlievo Municipality (main town: Sevlievo)
4. Tryavna Municipality (main town: Tryavna)

== Haskovo Province ==
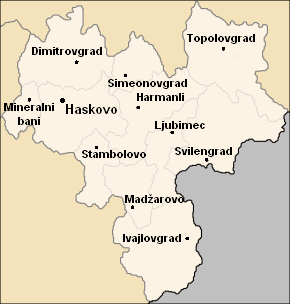
The municipalities of Haskovo Province

1. Dimitrovgrad Municipality (main town: Dimitrovgrad)
2. Harmanli Municipality (main town: Harmanli)
3. Haskovo Municipality (main town: Haskovo)
4. Ivaylovgrad Municipality (main town: Ivaylovgrad)
5. Lyubimets Municipality (main town: Lyubimets)
6. Madzharovo Municipality (main town: Madzharovo)
7. Mineralni Bani Municipality (main village: Mineralni Bani)
8. Simeonovgrad Municipality (main town: Simeonovgrad)
9. Stambolovo Municipality (main village: Stambolovo)
10. Svilengrad Municipality (main town: Svilengrad)
11. Topolovgrad Municipality (main town: Topolovgrad)

== Kardzhali Province ==
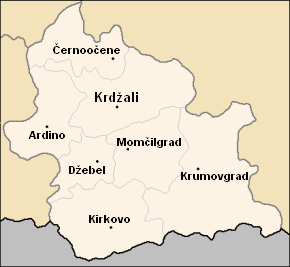
The municipalities of Kardzhali Province

1. Ardino Municipality (main town: Ardino)
2. Chernoochene Municipality (main village: Chernoochene)
3. Dzhebel Municipality (main town: Dzhebel)
4. Kardzhali Municipality (main town: Kardzhali)
5. Kirkovo Municipality (main village: Kirkovo)
6. Krumovgrad Municipality (main town: Krumovgrad)
7. Momchilgrad Municipality (main town: Momchilgrad)

== Kyustendil Province ==
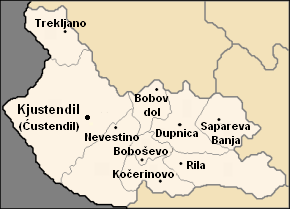
The municipalities of Kyustendil Province

1. Boboshevo Municipality (main town: Boboshevo)
2. Bobov Dol Municipality (main town: Bobov Dol)
3. Dupnitsa Municipality (main town: Dupnitsa)
4. Kocherinovo Municipality (main town: Kocherinovo)
5. Kyustendil Municipality (main town: Kyustendil)
6. Nevestino Municipality (main village: Nevestino)
7. Rila Municipality (main town: Rila)
8. Sapareva Banya Municipality (main town: Sapareva Banya)
9. Treklyano Municipality (main village: Treklyano)

== Lovech Province ==
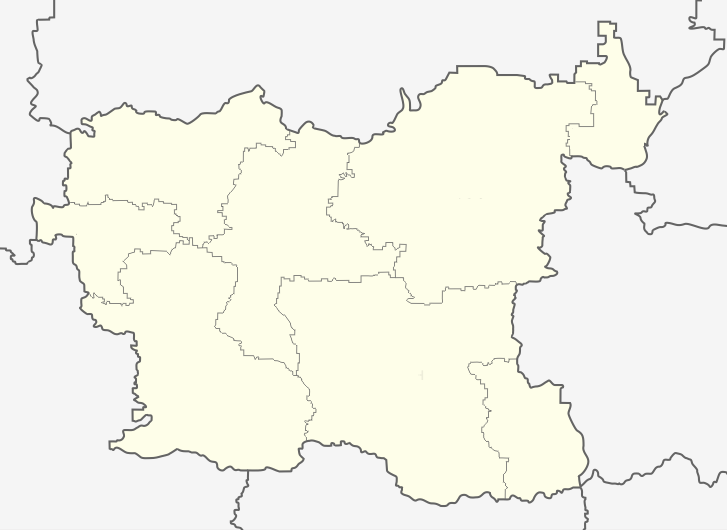
1. Apriltsi Municipality (main town: Apriltsi)
2. Letnitsa Municipality (main town: Letnitsa)
3. Lovech Municipality (main town: Lovech)
4. Lukovit Municipality (main town: Lukovit)
5. Teteven Municipality (main town: Teteven)
6. Troyan Municipality (main town: Troyan)
7. Ugarchin Municipality (main town: Ugarchin)
8. Yablanitsa Municipality (main town: Yablanitsa)

== Montana Province ==
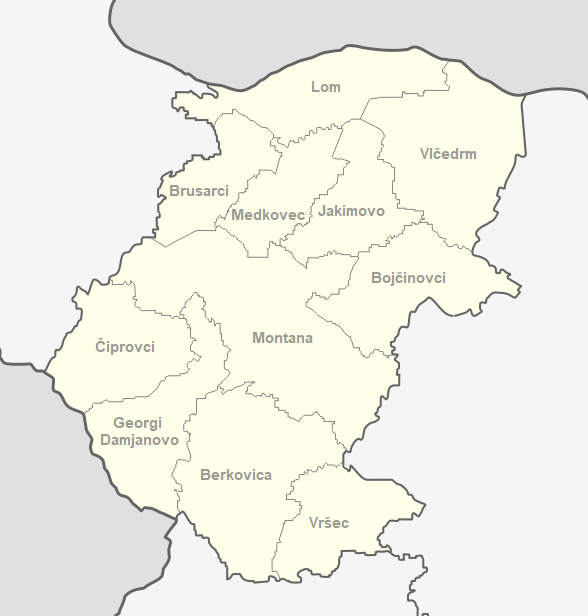
The municipalities of Montana Province

1. Berkovitsa Municipality (main town: Berkovitsa)
2. Boychinovtsi Municipality (main town: Boychinovtsi)
3. Brusartsi Municipality (main town: Brusartsi)
4. Chiprovtsi Municipality (main town: Chiprovtsi)
5. Georgi Damyanovo Municipality (main village: Georgi Damyanovo)
6. Lom Municipality (main town: Lom)
7. Medkovets Municipality (main village: Medkovets)
8. Montana Municipality (main town: Montana)
9. Valchedram Municipality (main town: Valchedram)
10. Varshets Municipality (main town: Varshets)
11. Yakimovo Municipality (main village: Yakimovo)

== Pazardzhik Province ==
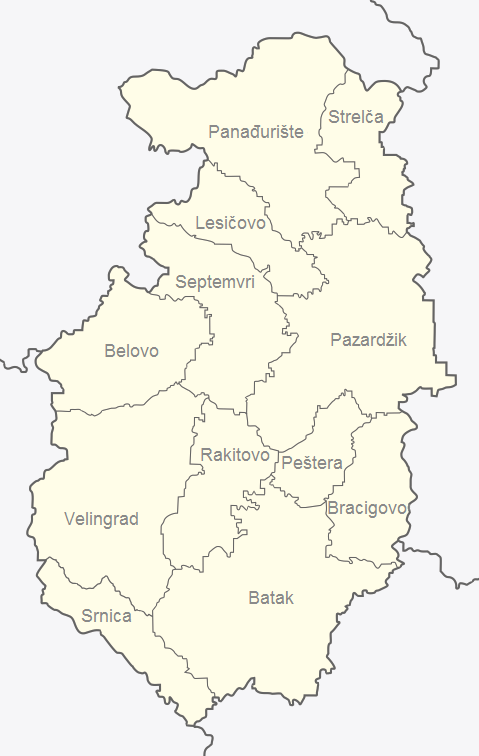
The municipalities of Pazardzhik Province

1. Batak Municipality (main town: Batak)
2. Belovo Municipality (main town: Belovo)
3. Bratsigovo Municipality (main town: Bratsigovo)
4. Lesichovo Municipality (main village: Lesichovo)
5. Panagyurishte Municipality (main town: Panagyurishte)
6. Pazardzhik Municipality (main town: Pazardzhik)
7. Peshtera Municipality (main town: Peshtera)
8. Rakitovo Municipality (main town: Rakitovo)
9. Sarnitsa Municipality (main town: Sarnitsa)
10. Septemvri Municipality (main town: Septemvri)
11. Strelcha Municipality (main town: Strelcha)
12. Velingrad Municipality (main town: Velingrad)

== Pernik Province ==
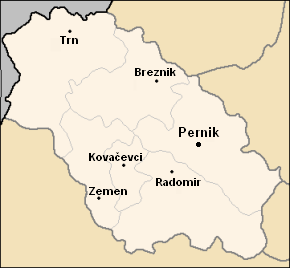
The municipalities of Pernik Province

1. Breznik Municipality (main town: Breznik)
2. Kovachevtsi Municipality (main village: Kovachevtsi)
3. Pernik Municipality (main town: Pernik)
4. Radomir Municipality (main town: Radomir)
5. Tran Municipality (main town: Tran)
6. Zemen Municipality (main town: Zemen)

== Pleven Province ==
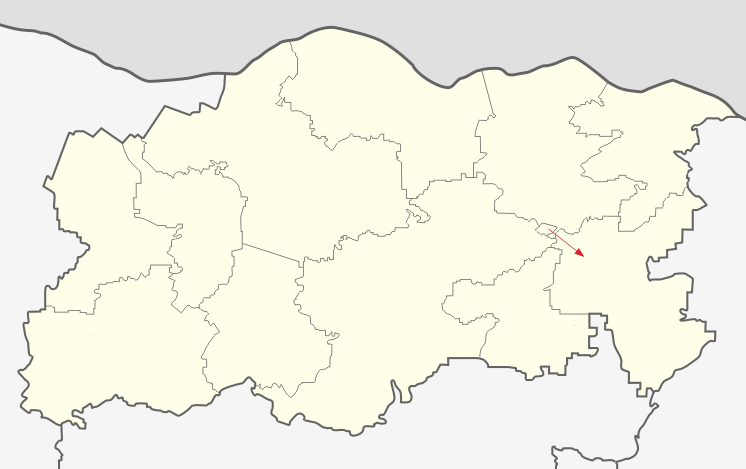

1. Belene Municipality (main town: Belene)
2. Cherven Bryag Municipality (main town: Cherven Bryag)
3. Dolna Mitropoliya Municipality (main town: Dolna Mitropoliya)
4. Dolni Dabnik Municipality (main town: Dolni Dabnik)
5. Gulyantsi Municipality (main town: Gulyantsi)
6. Iskar Municipality (main town: Iskar)
7. Knezha Municipality (main town: Knezha)
8. Levski Municipality (main town: Levski)
9. Nikopol Municipality (main town: Nikopol)
10. Pleven Municipality (main town: Pleven)
11. Pordim Municipality (main town: Pordim)

== Plovdiv Province ==
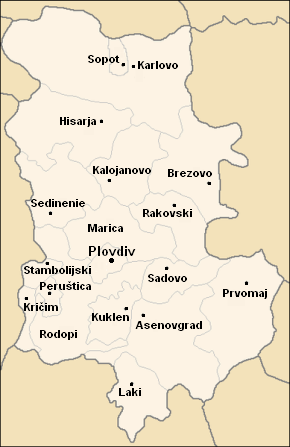
The municipalities of Plovdiv Province

1. Asenovgrad Municipality (main town: Asenovgrad)
2. Brezovo Municipality (main town: Brezovo)
3. Hisarya Municipality (main town: Hisarya)
4. Kaloyanovo Municipality (main village: Kaloyanovo)
5. Karlovo Municipality (main town: Karlovo)
6. Krichim Municipality (main town: Krichim)
7. Kuklen Municipality (main town: Kuklen)
8. Laki Municipality (main town: Laki)
9. Maritsa Municipality (administrative city: Plovdiv)
10. Parvomay Municipality (main town: Parvomay)
11. Perushtitsa Municipality (main town: Perushtitsa)
12. Plovdiv Municipality (main town: Plovdiv)
13. Rakovski Municipality (main town: Rakovski)
14. Rodopi Municipality (administrative town: Plovdiv)
15. Sadovo Municipality (main town: Sadovo)
16. Saedinenie Municipality (main town: Saedinenie)
17. Sopot Municipality (main town: Sopot)
18. Stamboliyski Municipality (main town: Stamboliyski)

== Razgrad Province ==
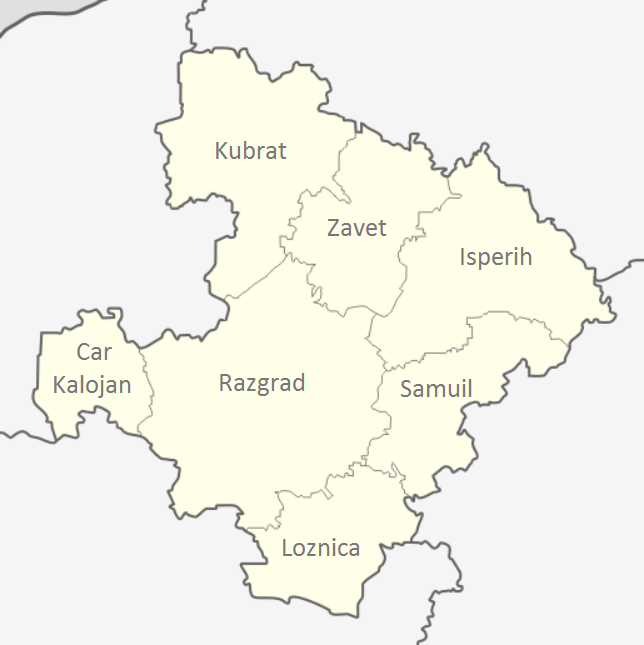
The municipalities of Razgrad Province

1. Isperih Municipality (main town: Isperih)
2. Kubrat Municipality (main town: Kubrat)
3. Loznitsa Municipality (main town: Loznitsa)
4. Razgrad Municipality (main town: Razgrad)
5. Samuil Municipality (main village: Samuil)
6. Tsar Kaloyan Municipality (main town: Tsar Kaloyan)
7. Zavet Municipality (main town: Zavet)

== Ruse Province ==
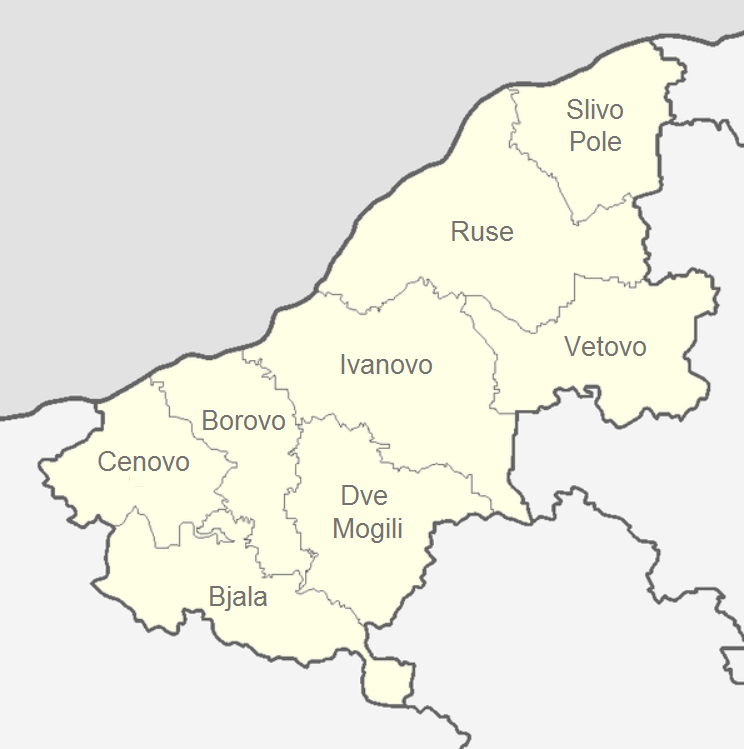
The municipalities of Ruse Province

1. Borovo Municipality (main town: Borovo)
2. Byala Municipality (main town: Byala)
3. Dve Mogili Municipality (main town: Dve Mogili)
4. Ivanovo Municipality (main village: Ivanovo)
5. Ruse Municipality (main town: Ruse)
6. Slivo Pole Municipality (main town: Slivo Pole)
7. Tsenovo Municipality (main village: Tsenovo)
8. Vetovo Municipality (main town: Vetovo)

== Shumen Province ==
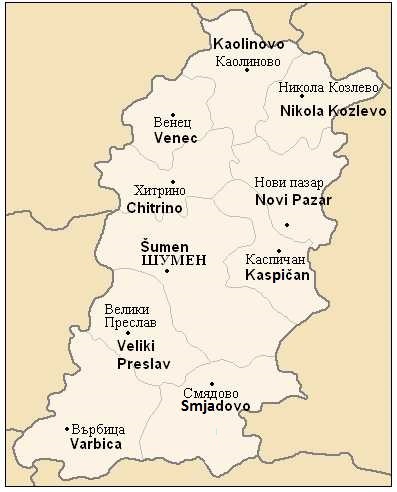
The municipalities of Shumen Province

1. Hitrino Municipality (main village: Hitrino)
2. Kaolinovo Municipality (main town: Kaolinovo)
3. Kaspichan Municipality (main town: Kaspichan)
4. Nikola Kozlevo Municipality (main village: Nikola Kozlevo)
5. Novi Pazar Municipality (main town: Novi Pazar)
6. Shumen Municipality (main town: Shumen)
7. Smyadovo Municipality (main town: Smyadovo)
8. Varbitsa Municipality (main town: Varbitsa)
9. Veliki Preslav Municipality (main town: Veliki Preslav)
10. Venets Municipality (main village: Venets)

== Silistra Province ==
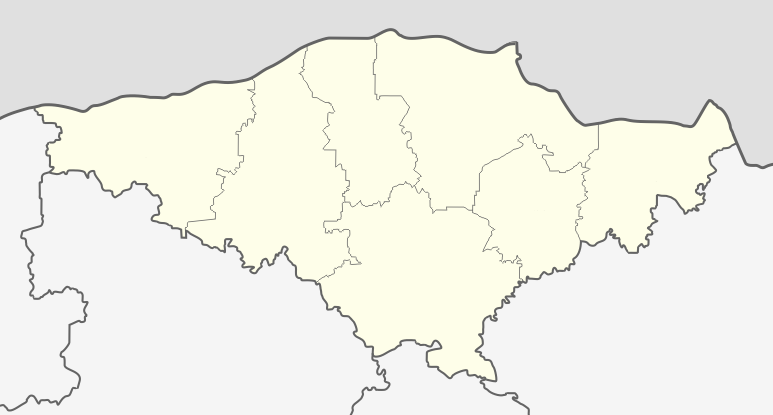
1. Alfatar Municipality (main town: Alfatar)
2. Dulovo Municipality (main town: Dulovo)
3. Glavinitsa Municipality (main town: Glavinitsa)
4. Kaynardzha Municipality (main village: Kaynardzha)
5. Silistra Municipality (main town: Silistra)
6. Sitovo Municipality (main village: Sitovo)
7. Tutrakan Municipality (main town: Tutrakan)

== Sliven Province ==
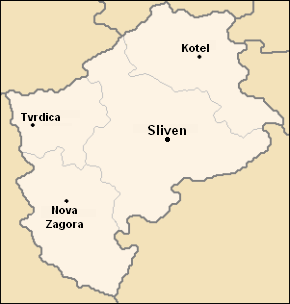
The municipalities of Sliven Province

1. Kotel Municipality (main town: Kotel)
2. Nova Zagora Municipality (main town: Nova Zagora)
3. Sliven Municipality (main town: Sliven)
4. Tvarditsa Municipality (main town: Tvarditsa)

== Smolyan Province ==
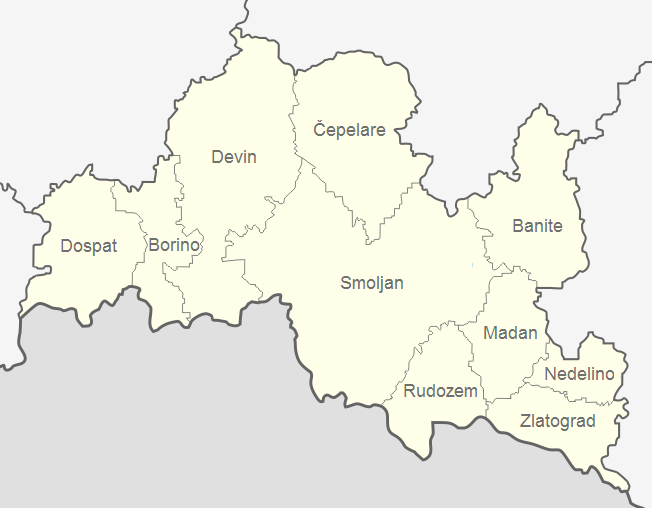
The municipalities of Smolyan Province

1. Banite Municipality (main village: Banite)
2. Borino Municipality (main village: Borino)
3. Chepelare Municipality (main town: Chepelare)
4. Devin Municipality (main town: Devin)
5. Dospat Municipality (main town: Dospat)
6. Madan Municipality (main town: Madan)
7. Nedelino Municipality (main town: Nedelino)
8. Rudozem Municipality (main town: Rudozem)
9. Smolyan Municipality (main town: Smolyan)
10. Zlatograd Municipality (main town: Zlatograd)

== Sofia City Province ==
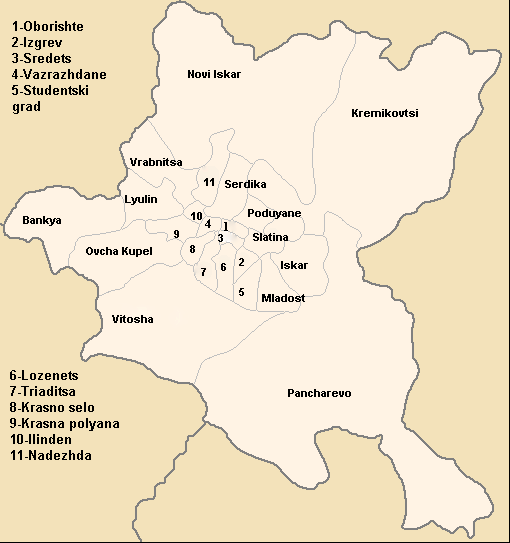
The municipalities of Sofia City Province

1. Sofia Municipality (main town: Sofia)

== Sofia Province ==
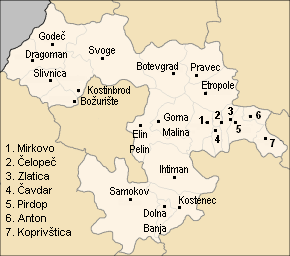
The municipalities of Sofia Province

1. Anton Municipality (main village: Anton)
2. Botevgrad Municipality (main town: Botevgrad)
3. Bozhurishte Municipality (main town: Bozhurishte)
4. Chavdar Municipality (main village: Chavdar)
5. Chelopech Municipality (main village: Chelopech)
6. Dolna Banya Municipality (main town: Dolna Banya)
7. Dragoman Municipality (main town: Dragoman)
8. Elin Pelin Municipality (main town: Elin Pelin)
9. Etropole Municipality (main town: Etropole)
10. Godech Municipality (main town: Godech)
11. Gorna Malina Municipality (main village: Gorna Malina)
12. Ihtiman Municipality (main town: Ihtiman)
13. Koprivshtitsa Municipality (main town: Koprivshtitsa)
14. Kostenets Municipality (main town: Kostenets)
15. Kostinbrod Municipality (main town: Kostinbrod)
16. Mirkovo Municipality (main village: Mirkovo)
17. Pirdop Municipality (main town: Pirdop)
18. Pravets Municipality (main town: Pravets)
19. Samokov Municipality (main town: Samokov)
20. Slivnitsa Municipality (main town: Slivnitsa)
21. Svoge Municipality (main town: Svoge)
22. Zlatitsa Municipality (main town: Zlatitsa)

== Stara Zagora Province ==
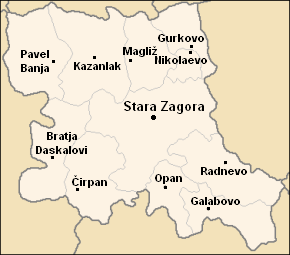
The municipalities of Stara Zagora Province

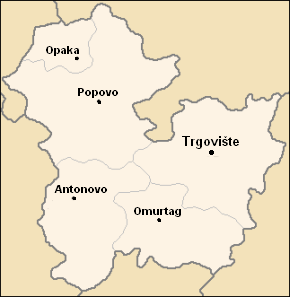
The municipalities of Targovishte Province

1. Bratya Daskalovi Municipality (main village: Bratya Daskalovi)
2. Chirpan Municipality (main town: Chirpan)
3. Galabovo Municipality (main town: Galabovo)
4. Gurkovo Municipality (main town: Gurkovo)
5. Kazanlak Municipality (main town: Kazanlak)
6. Maglizh Municipality (main town: Maglizh)
7. Nikolaevo Municipality (main town: Nikolaevo)
8. Opan Municipality (main village: Opan)
9. Pavel Banya Municipality (main town: Pavel Banya)
10. Radnevo Municipality (main town: Radnevo)
11. Stara Zagora Municipality (main town: Stara Zagora)

== Targovishte Province ==
1. Antonovo Municipality (main town: Antonovo)
2. Omurtag Municipality (main town: Omurtag)
3. Opaka Municipality (main town: Opaka)
4. Popovo Municipality (main town: Popovo)
5. Targovishte Municipality (main town: Targovishte)

== Varna Province ==
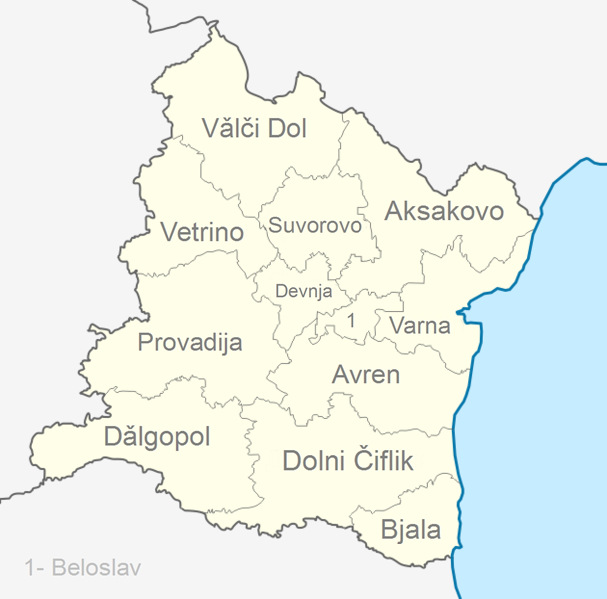
The municipalities of Varna Province

1. Aksakovo Municipality (main town: Aksakovo)
2. Avren Municipality (main village: Avren)
3. Beloslav Municipality (main town: Beloslav)
4. Byala Municipality (main town: Byala)
5. Dalgopol Municipality (main town: Dalgopol)
6. Devnya Municipality (main town: Devnya)
7. Dolni Chiflik Municipality (main town: Dolni Chiflik)
8. Provadiya Municipality (main town: Provadiya)
9. Suvorovo Municipality (main town: Suvorovo)
10. Valchi Dol Municipality (main town: Valchi Dol)
11. Varna Municipality (main town: Varna)
12. Vetrino Municipality (main village: Vetrino)

== Veliko Tarnovo Province ==
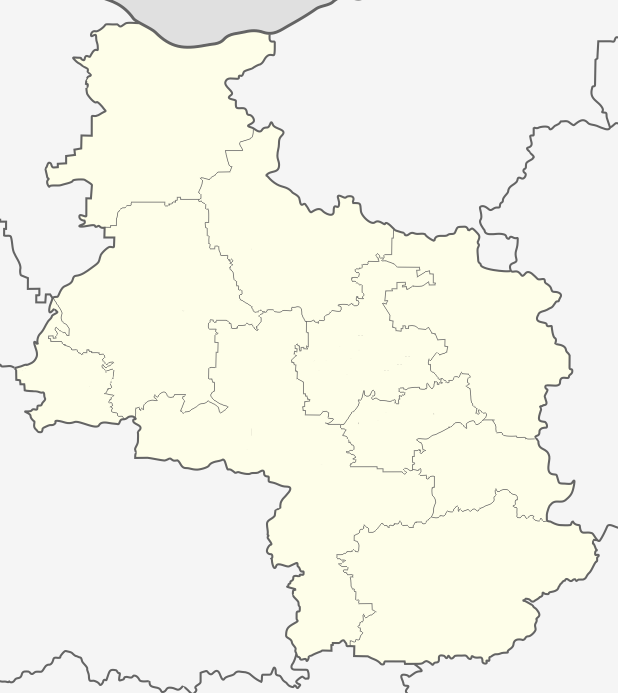
1. Elena Municipality (main town: Elena)
2. Gorna Oryahovitsa Municipality (main town: Gorna Oryahovitsa)
3. Lyaskovets Municipality (main town: Lyaskovets)
4. Pavlikeni Municipality (main town: Pavlikeni)
5. Polski Trambesh Municipality (main town: Polski Trambesh)
6. Strazhitsa Municipality (main town: Strazhitsa)
7. Suhindol Municipality (main town: Suhindol)
8. Svishtov Municipality (main town: Svishtov)
9. Veliko Tarnovo Municipality (main town: Veliko Tarnovo)
10. Zlataritsa Municipality (main town: Zlataritsa)

== Vidin Province ==
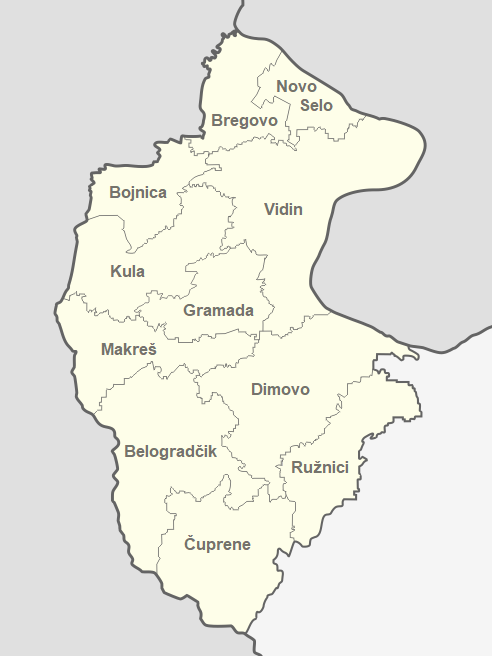
The municipalities of Vidin Province

1. Belogradchik Municipality (main town: Belogradchik)
2. Boynitsa Municipality (main village: Boynitsa)
3. Bregovo Municipality (main town: Bregovo)
4. Chuprene Municipality (main village: Chuprene)
5. Dimovo Municipality (main town: Dimovo)
6. Gramada Municipality (main town: Gramada)
7. Kula Municipality (main town: Kula)
8. Makresh Municipality (main village: Makresh)
9. Novo Selo Municipality (main village: Novo Selo)
10. Ruzhintsi Municipality (main village: Ruzhintsi)
11. Vidin Municipality (main town: Vidin)

== Vratsa Province ==
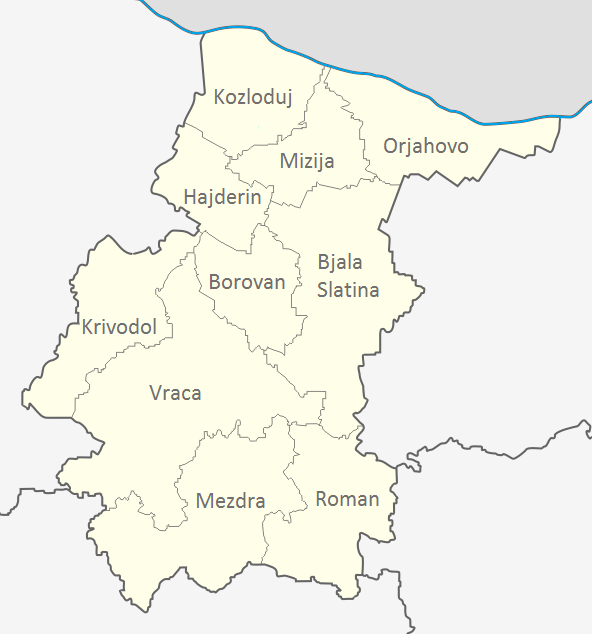
The municipalities of Vratsa Province

1. Borovan Municipality (main village: Borovan)
2. Byala Slatina Municipality (main town: Byala Slatina)
3. Hayredin Municipality (main village: Hayredin)
4. Kozloduy Municipality (main town: Kozloduy)
5. Krivodol Municipality (main town: Krivodol)
6. Mezdra Municipality (main town: Mezdra)
7. Miziya Municipality (main town: Miziya)
8. Oryahovo Municipality (main town: Oryahovo)
9. Roman Municipality (main town: Roman)
10. Vratsa Municipality (main town: Vratsa)

== Yambol Province ==
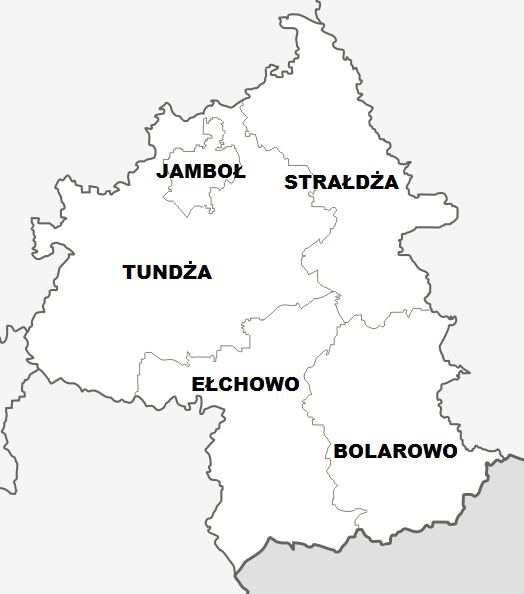
The municipalities of Yambol Province

1. Bolyarovo Municipality (main town: Bolyarovo)
2. Elhovo Municipality (main town: Elhovo)
3. Straldzha Municipality (main town: Straldzha)
4. Tundzha Municipality (administrative town: Tundzha)
5. Yambol Municipality (main town: Yambol)

== See also ==
- Bulgaria
- Provinces of Bulgaria
- List of cities and towns in Bulgaria
- List of villages in Bulgaria
