= Krichim Municipality =

Coordinates: 42°03′N 24°28′E

Krichim Municipality Община Кричим
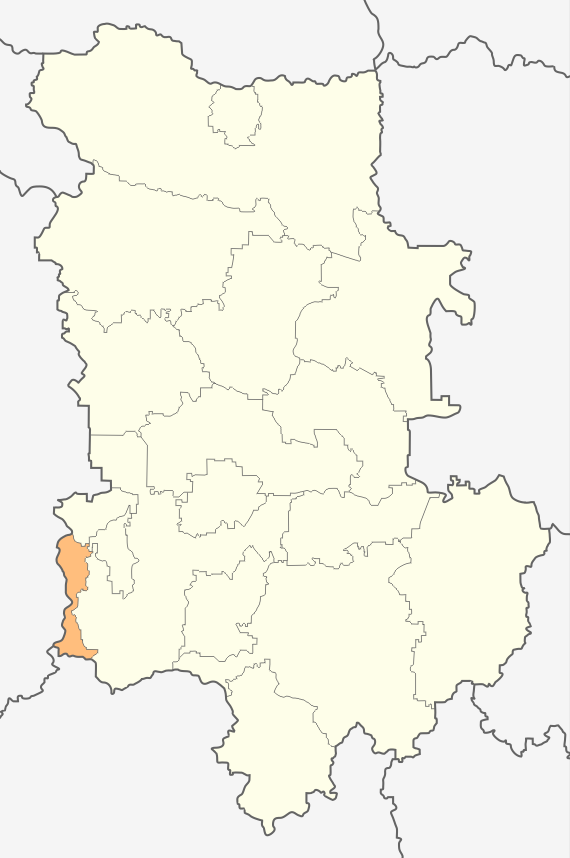
- Country: Bulgaria
- Province: Plovdiv Province
- Seat: Krichim

Area
  - Total: 54.9 km^{2} (21.2 sq mi)

Population (2024)
  - Total: 7,128
  - Density: 130/km^{2} (336/sq mi)
- Website: www.krichim.bg

Krichim Municipality (Bulgarian: Община Кричим) is a municipality in Plovdiv Province, central Bulgaria. Covering a territory of 54.9 km^{2}, it is the 17th largest of the 18 municipalities in the province, encompassing 0.92% of its total area. It is the third smallest by area in the country, after Perushtitsa and Chelopech. It is also one of the two municipalities with disjunct territory, along with Zlatitsa, and among the nine that contains a single settlement. It borders the municipalities of Stamboliyski to the north, Perushtitsa to the northeast, Rodopi to the east, Devin to the south, as well as Bratsigovo and Pazardzhik to the west. Until 1998 Krichim was part of Rodopi Municipality.

== Geography ==
The municipality has a flat topography to the north and mountainous to the south. Its northernmost reaches lie in the central part of the Pazardzhik–Plovdiv Field, which constitutes the western half of the Upper Thracian Plain, where the lowest point at 206 m is located. Also in the north is a small section of the easternmost slopes of the Besaparski Hills, a small northerly elevation of the Rhodope Mountains. Further south, covering most of the municipality, rise two of the main ridges of the Rhodopes, Ravnogor and Chernatitsa. In the latter, at its southeasternmost point on the boundary with the Rodopi Municipality, is the highest elevation at the summit of Kadieva Varnitsa (1,657 m).

Krichim Municipality falls within the transitional continental climatic zone. In direction south–north runs a 24 km section of the Vacha, a right tributary of the river Maritsa of the Aegean Sea drainage. The river flows in a deep forested valley. Along its course are located the Krichim Reservoir just south of the municipal seat, and the Vacha Reservoir, whose dam wall is in the southwestern corner of the municipality, both important junctions of the Dospat–Vacha Hydropower Cascade. In the northern part of its territory flows a 5 km section of the Stara reka, another of the Maritsa's left tributaries.

== Transport ==
Krichim Municipality is traversed by two roads of the national network with a total length of 23.5 km, a 21.1 km section of the third class III-866 road, and a 2.4 km stretch of the third class III-8602 road.

In the northern part runs an 4.2 km stretch of railway line No. 18 Stamboliyski–Peshtera.

== Demography ==
The population is 7,128 as of 2024. The municipal seat Krichim is the only settlement of the administrative division.

== Gallery ==
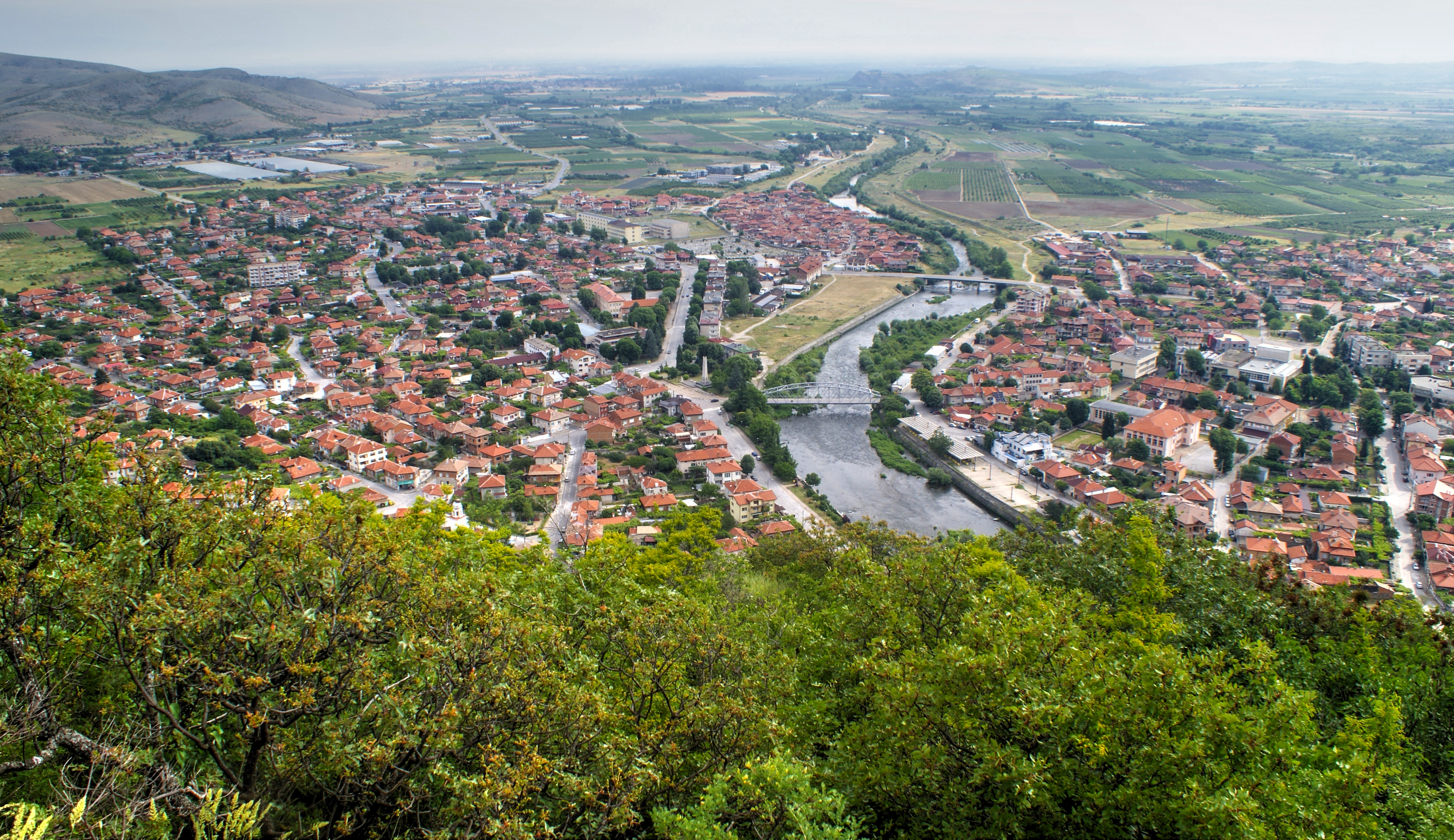
A view of Krichim

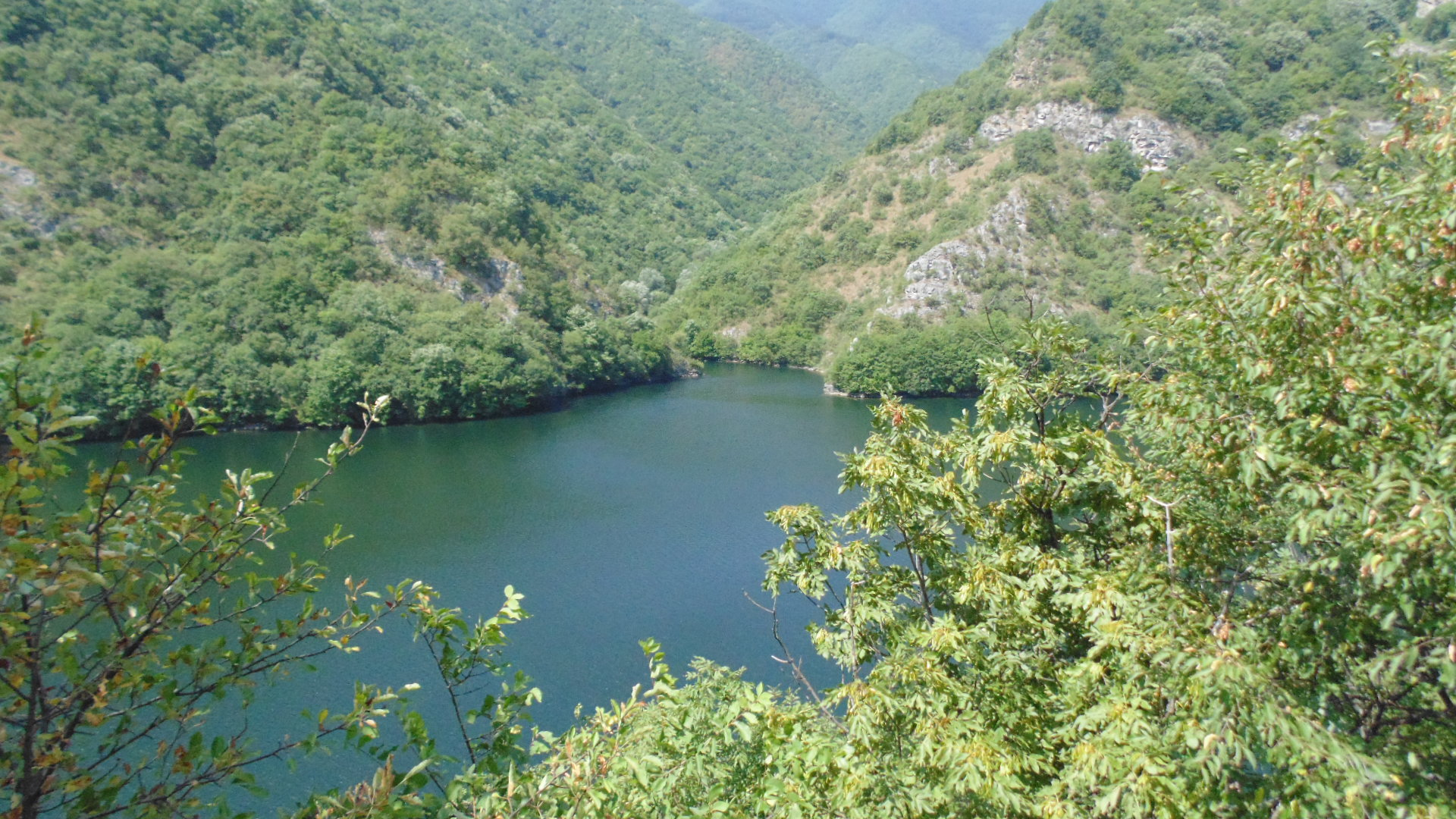
Krichim Reservoir

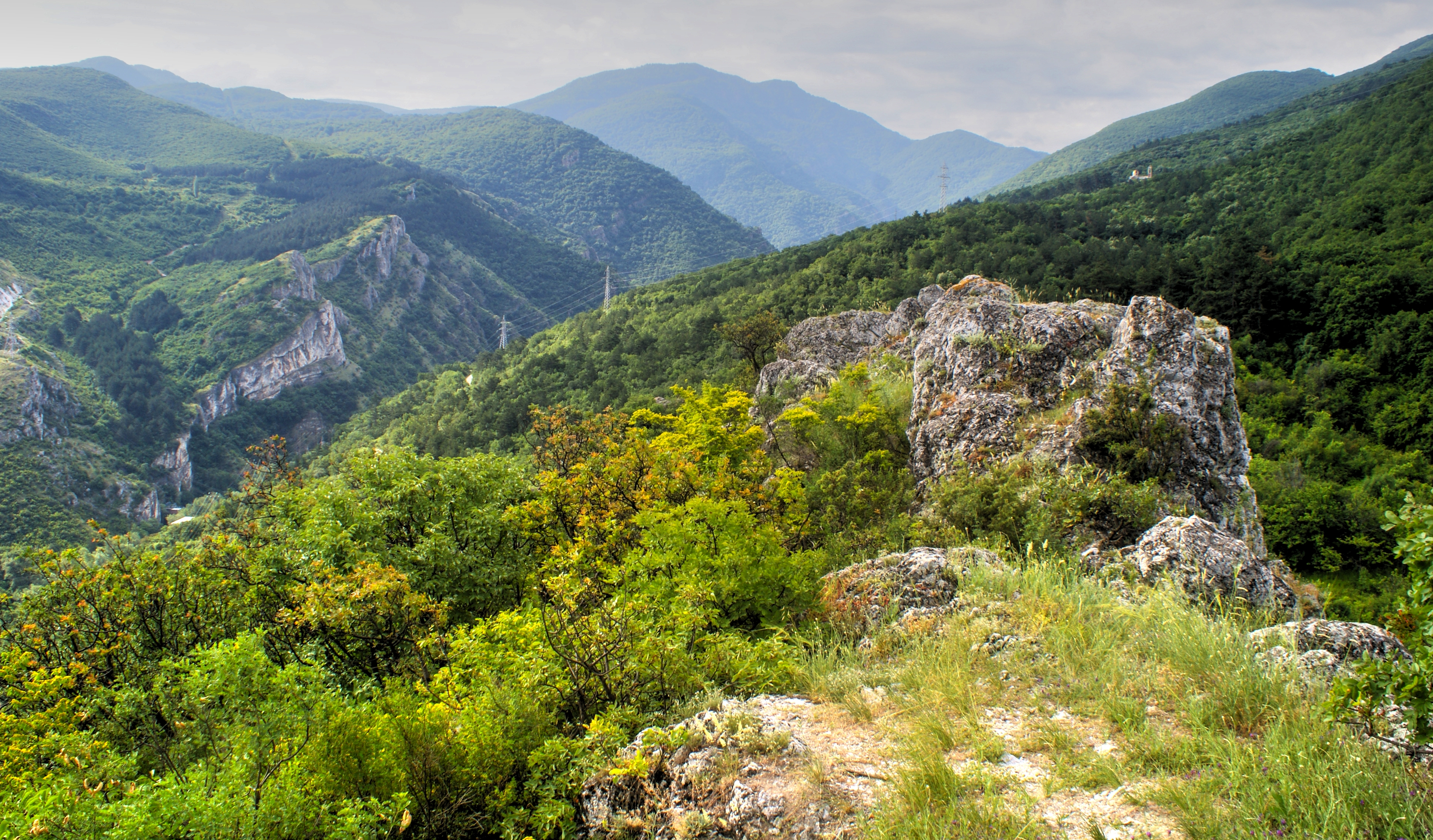
The Rhodopes at Ivankovo Kale

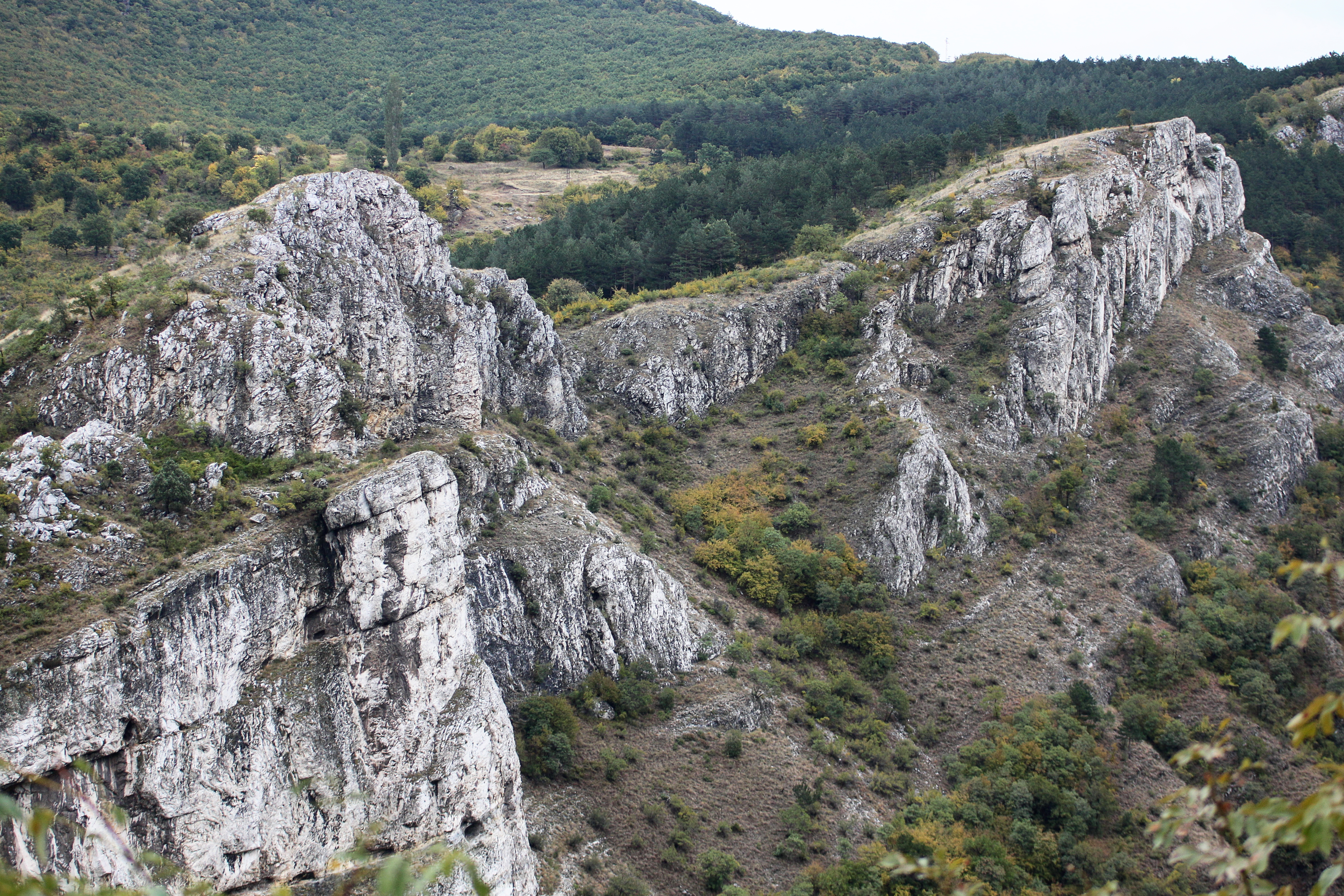
The Rhodopes near Krichim
