= Marin Roussev Mehandjiev =

Bulgarian chemist (1927–2005)

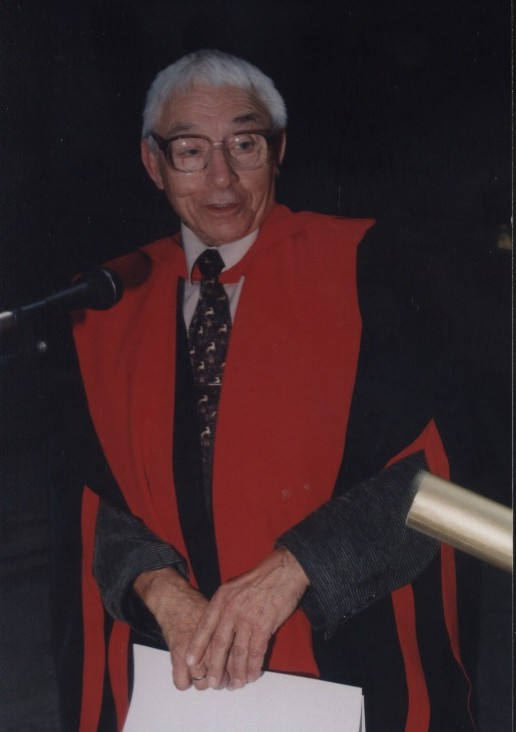
- Born: March 8, 1927; Sofia, Bulgaria
- Died: November 12, 2005 (aged 78); Sofia, Bulgaria
- Education: State Polytechnic in Sofia
- Occupation: Chemistry engineer
- Scientific career
- Fields: Chemistry
- Institutions: High Chemical Technological Institute in Sofia; Physicochemistry Institute in BAS

Marin Roussev Mehandjiev (1927-2005) was a Bulgarian chemist who had been nominated for Nobel Prize in chemistry in 2004.

== Biography ==
Mehandjiev was born on March 8, 1927, in Sofia, Bulgaria, in the family of an officer. His father, Colonel Roussi Mehandjiev, climbs the ladder of military career and in 1937 was the head of the Intelligence Department in the Ministry of Defence, in 1938 was sent as military attache in Turkey, and afterwards he was appointed as chief of staff of the Fourth Army . Basic education Marin Mehandjiev gets teaching in different cities not only in Bulgaria and secondary education ends at First Boys School in Sofia. In 1949, he completed a master's degree in chemical engineering as valedictorian of the first class at the State Polytechnic in Sofia. In 1971, he was elected associate professor in non-ferrous metallurgy from the High Chemical Technological Institute in Sofia. In 1971 he obtained his Ph.D. from the High Chemical Technological Institute in Burgas. In 1989, Mehandjiev took his second associate professor degree in non-equilibrium thermodynamics of accumulation processes from the Institute of Physical Chemistry of the Bulgarian Academy of Sciences.

== Career ==
As a specialist academic Mehandjiev worked in various companies in the country, creates and manages research laboratory at Elysseina Mining, Ore-Processing and Metallurgical Company, Research Centre in Pirdop Copper Smelting Works; became a researcher at several institutes such as the Institute of Non-Ferrous Metallurgy, Niproruda, Engineering Company Chimcomplect. In 1987 he was appointed as scientific director of Biotech Science & Engineering Co., Varna, as well as Head of the Chair of Chemical and Biotechnological Processes and Equipment in Institute of Biotechnology, Razgrad. Was lecturer in ecological modeling in the South-Western University N. Rilski Blagoevgrad and in ecology and technical safety in the College of Telecommunications in Sofia. Expert of "BIMAK" Company Chelopech and head ecologist of the museum-town Koprivshtitsa.

== Nominated for Nobel Prize ==
Mehandjiev was nominated for the Nobel Prize in chemistry in 2004 year by Ansted University for his contribution to the Non-Equilibrium Thermodynamics of Accumulation Processes and its applications, particularly the cancerogenic theory based on the proper protective mechanism of cellular tissues.

== Scientific awards and titles ==
- Doctor Honoris Causa of the International Academy for Culture and Political Science, United States (1999)
- Doctor in International Relations at the University of Alabama, United States (1999)
- Professor in Human Rights and Environment of the International Association of Lecturers of UNESCO, UNICEF, ECOSOC/UNO (1999)
- President of the Foundation "Science and analyzes related to the environment" (2000)
- Doctor Honoris Causa in Biotechnology and Bioathmosphere, Ansted University, (2001)
- Doctor Honoris Causa in Non-Equilibrium Thermodynamics of the University of Oradea [Romania (2003)
- Honorary Doctor of the International Ecological University "D. Sakharov, "Minsk, Belarus (2005)
- Corresponding Member of the Ukrainian Ecological Academy (1995)
- Corresponding Member of the Royal Academy of Pharmacy Madrid, [Spain (2002)
- Academician of the World Peace Academy, United States (1998)
- Academician of the Central European Academy of Science and Art, Timișoara / Bratislava (2000)
- Academician of the Balkan Academy of Science and Culture (2001)
- Academician of the Romanian-Moldovan Ecological Academy Yash, Romania (2001)
- Honorary Academician of the World Academy of Sciences, Technologies, Education and Humanitarians, Valencia, Spain (2003)
- Honorary Academician of the International Academy "Gretchy Marino," Italy (2005)

== Memberships ==
- Member of the Union of Scientists in Bulgaria (1965)
- Member of the International Committee "Achievement in Science and Research for the Benefit of the Working People," Israel (1987)
- Founding member of the Balkan Union of Oncology (1995)
- Member of the New York Academy of Sciences (1996–1997)
- Member of the International Administration of the World University Roundtable, Benson, Arizona, United States (1997)
- Member of the Supreme Environmental Expert Council of the Ministry of Environment and Water as a national expert (1997, 1998)
- Honorary member of the Spanish Association of Professionals in Occupational Health and Environment (1998)
- Honorary Member of the Ansted University Board of Advisory Council (1999)
- Founding member of the Balkan Academy of Sciences and Culture (2001)
- Member of the Board of Advisory Council of the American Biographical Institute (2003)

== International recognition ==
Reserved his place in the reference editions of the Bibliothèque: World Wide:

- 500 Great Minds of the Early 21st Century (2002)
- 500 Outstanding Professors and Scholars (2004)

Mehandjiev is included in the reference guides:

- Marquis WHO is who in the World, Editions 14, 15, 16, 17, 18
- Who's Who in Science and Engineering, Edition 4
- The Environment Encyclopaedia and Directory, Sec. W. page 360/1, 1997;

In the reference guides of the International Biographical Centre, Cambridge, England:

- Outstanding Scientists of the 20th Century (1999)
- Outstanding Scientists of the 21st Century (2001)
- Outstanding People of the 20th Century (1999)
- Outstanding People of the 21st Century (2002)
- Outstanding Intellectuals of the 20th Century (2000)
- 2000 Outstanding Scientists of the 21st Century (2002)
- 2000 Outstanding Intellectuals of the 21st Century (2002)
- Living Legends (2003)
- International Who's Who of Intellectuals (1999)
- Who's Who in the 21st Century (2001)
- 2000 Outstanding Scholars of the 21st Century (2002)
- Dictionary of International Biography, Editions: 27; 28; 29; 30.

== Other awards and honors ==
- Awarded by the International Biographical Centre, Cambridge, England with the awards:
  - "Man of the Year" 1998, 1999, 2001, 2003
- "International Personality" 2000 / 2001
- "International Scientist" 2001
- "Award for Achievements in the 20th Century" 1998, 2000
- "Award for Achievements in the 21st Century", 2001
- "Medal of Distinction" 2002
- Awarded with the Sign of Honor of the Banja Luca University, Bosnia and Herzegovina, (2003, 2004)
- Honorary citizen of the Museum-town Koprivshtitsa, 2001

== Publications ==
Marin Mehandjiev has published more than 400 scientific papers and is the author of 18 monographs, most of which are included as required reading in questionnaires for state exams in universities. The most important of these are:

- Planning and Methods in Technological Investigations", Sofia, Technica Publ. House, 1975 (In Bulgarian)
- "Combined Research and Design for the Technological Processes in the Chemical Industry", Sofia, Technica Publ. House, 1981 (In Bulgarian)
- "Ecologization and Ecological Assessment", Svisthtov, Publ. V.F.S.I. "D. A. Tsenov", 1981 (In Bulgarian and Russian)
- "Processes and Equipments in the Biotechnology and in the Chemical Technology" Razgrad, Publ. I.B. 1989 (In Bulgarian)
- "Cancer: Enemy and Future Ally", Sofia, Publ. House Onix, 1994
- "Waste Reduction and Minimization in Mining, Ore-Processing and Metallurgical Plants", Sofia, "Fliorir" Rubl. House, 1996
- "Thermodynamics of Accumulation Processes in the Affected Systems", Sofia, "Filvest" Publ. House, 1997, Part I and II
- "Cancer: Enemy and Future Ally", Sofia, Publ. House "Jurispres", 2002
