= Stamboliyski Municipality =

Coordinates: 42°08′N 24°32′E

Stamboliyski Municipality Община Стамболийски
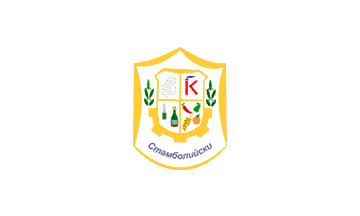
- Flag

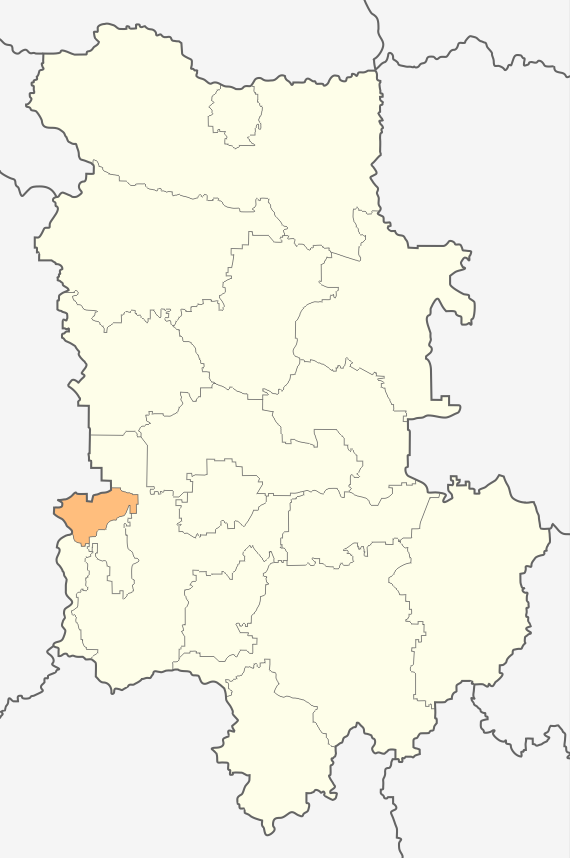
- Country: Bulgaria
- Province: Plovdiv Province
- Seat: Stamboliyski

Area
  - Total: 61.3 km^{2} (23.7 sq mi)

Population (2024)
  - Total: 17,654
  - Density: 288/km^{2} (746/sq mi)
- Website: stamboliyski.egov.bg/wps/portal/municipality-stamboliyski/home

Stamboliyski Municipality (Bulgarian: Община Стамболийски) is a municipality in Plovdiv Province, central Bulgaria. Covering a territory of 61.3 km^{2}, it is the 15th largest of the 18 municipalities in the province, encompassing 1.02% of its total area. It borders the municipalities of Rodopi to the northeast, Perushtitsa and Krichim to the south, Bratsigovo to the southwest, and Pazardzhik to the west and northwest, the latter two belonging to Pazardzhik Province.

== Geography ==
The municipality has a largely flat topography with some hilly areas to the west. It mostly lies in the central part of the Pazardzhik–Plovdiv Field, which constitutes the western half of the Upper Thracian Plain, where the lowest point at 172 m is located. In the west are the easternmost slopes of the Besaparski Hills, a small northerly elevation of the Rhodope Mountains; there lies its highest point at the peak of Shiroki Vrah (443 m).

Stamboliyski Municipality falls within the transitional continental climatic zone. Along its northern border flows a 13 km section of the river Maritsa of the Aegean Sea drainage, with the municipal territory spanning south of the river. It is drained by the lower course of two of the Maritsa’s right tributaries, the Stara reka and the Vacha.

== Transport ==
Stamboliyski Municipality is traversed by two roads of the national network with a total length of 21.6 km, an 11.2 km section of the third class III-375 road, and a 10.4 km stretch of the third class III-866 road. Just north its limits run two major highways, the Trakiya motorway (A1) which connects the capital Sofia with the Black Sea port of Burgas, and the first class I-8 road Kalotina–Sofia–Plovdiv–Kapitan Andreevo.

In direction west–east the municipality is crossed by 11.4 km section of railway line No. 1 Kalotina–Sofia–Plovdiv–Svilengrad. From Stamboliyski heading south runs an 8 km stretch of railway line No. 18 Stamboliyski–Peshtera.

== Demography ==
The population is 17,654 as of 2024.

There are four villages and one town in Stamboliyski Municipality:

- Kurtovo Konare
- Novo Selo
- Stamboliyski
- Trivoditsi
- Yoakim Gruevo

== Gallery ==
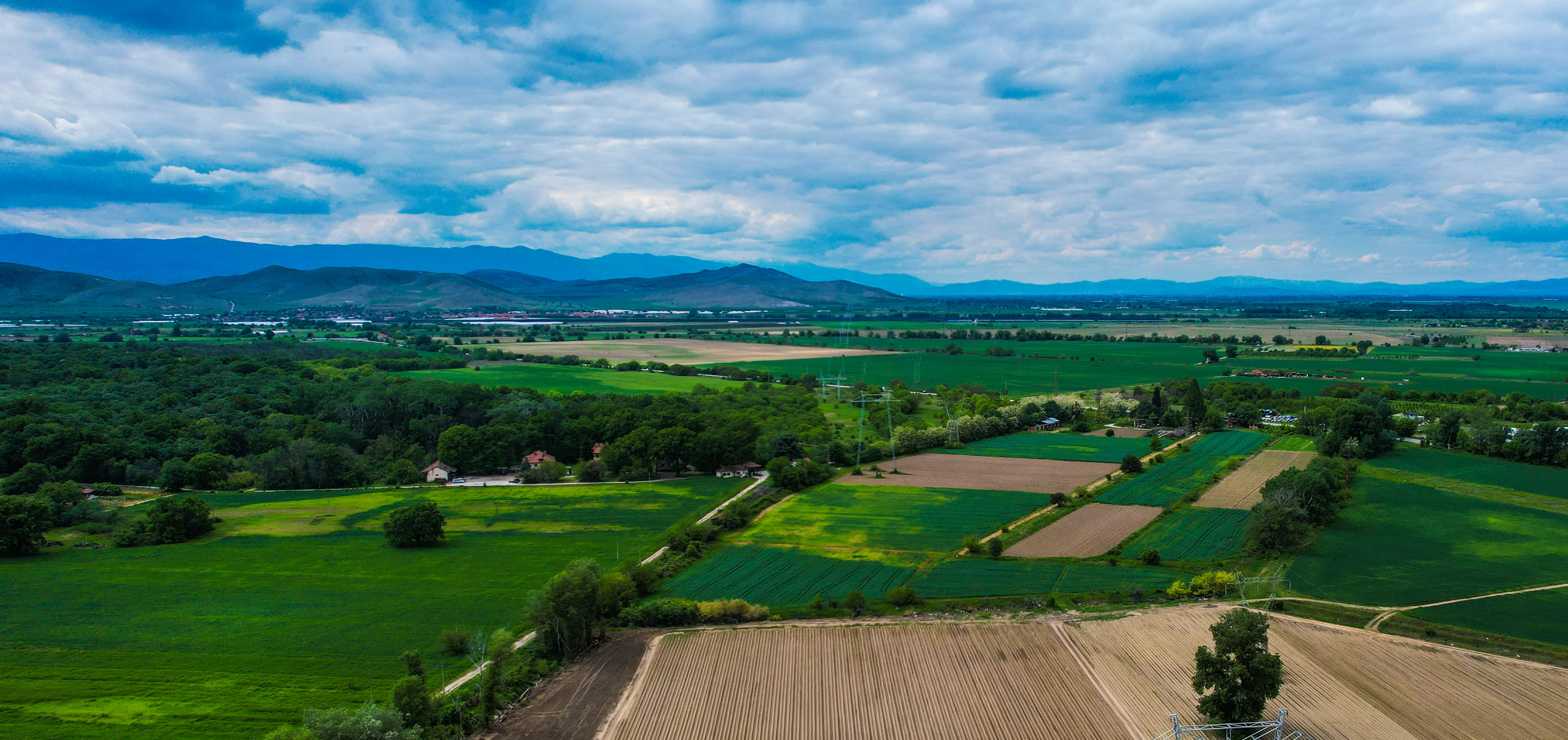
Aerial view of the municipality

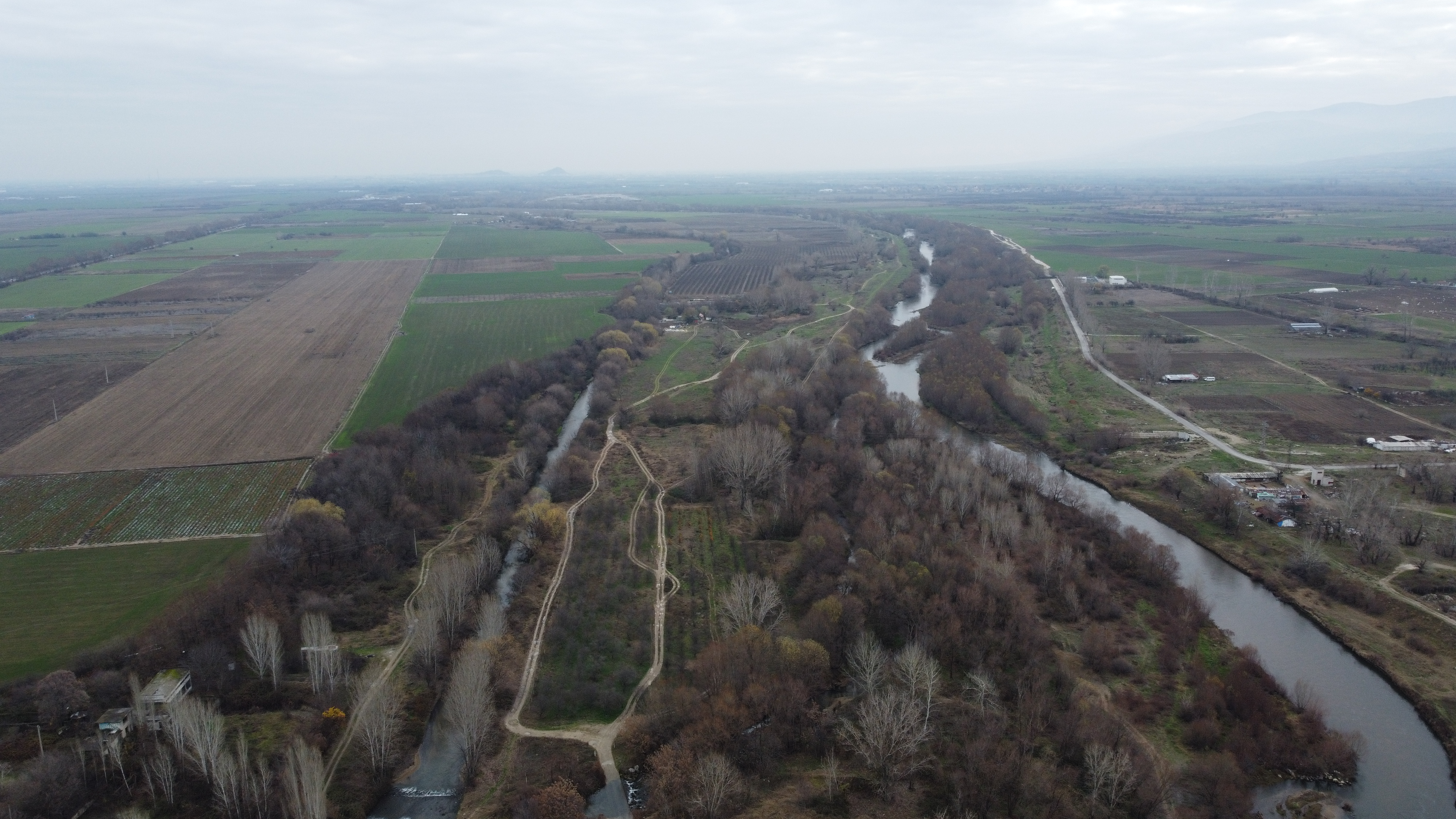
The Maritsa near Stamboliyski

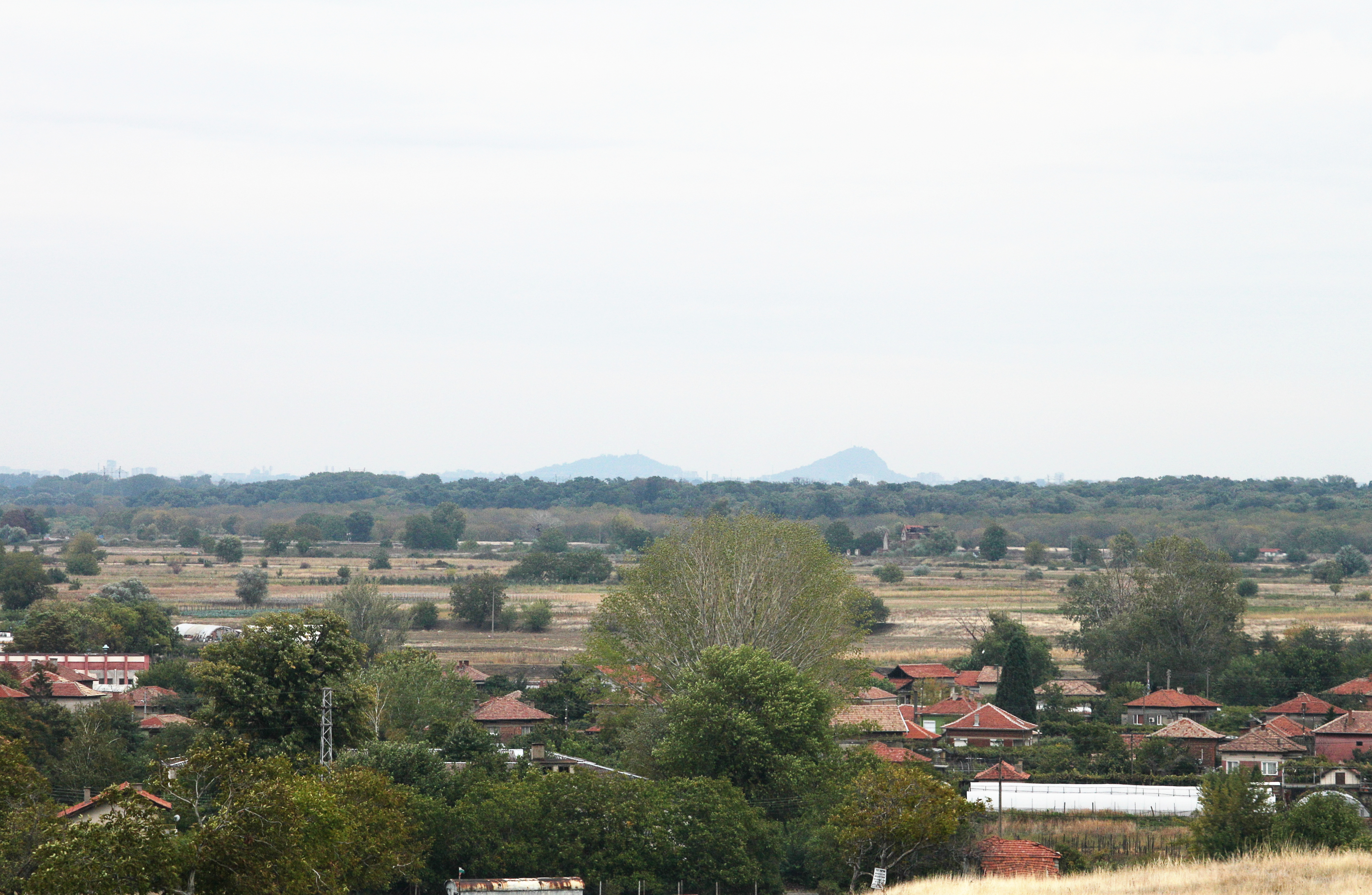
A view of Novo Selo

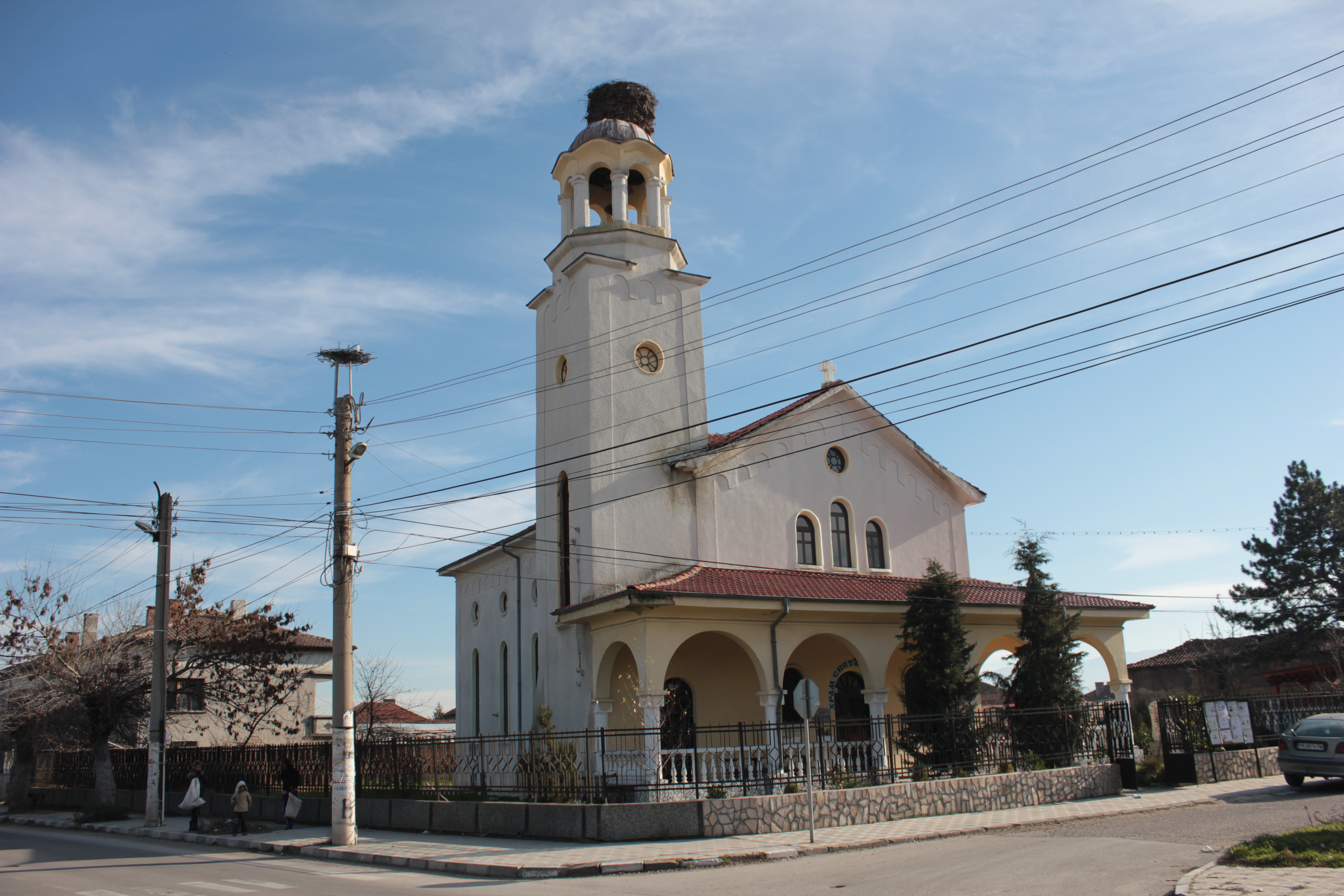
The Holy Trinity Church in Stamboliyski
