= Stara reka (Maritsa) =

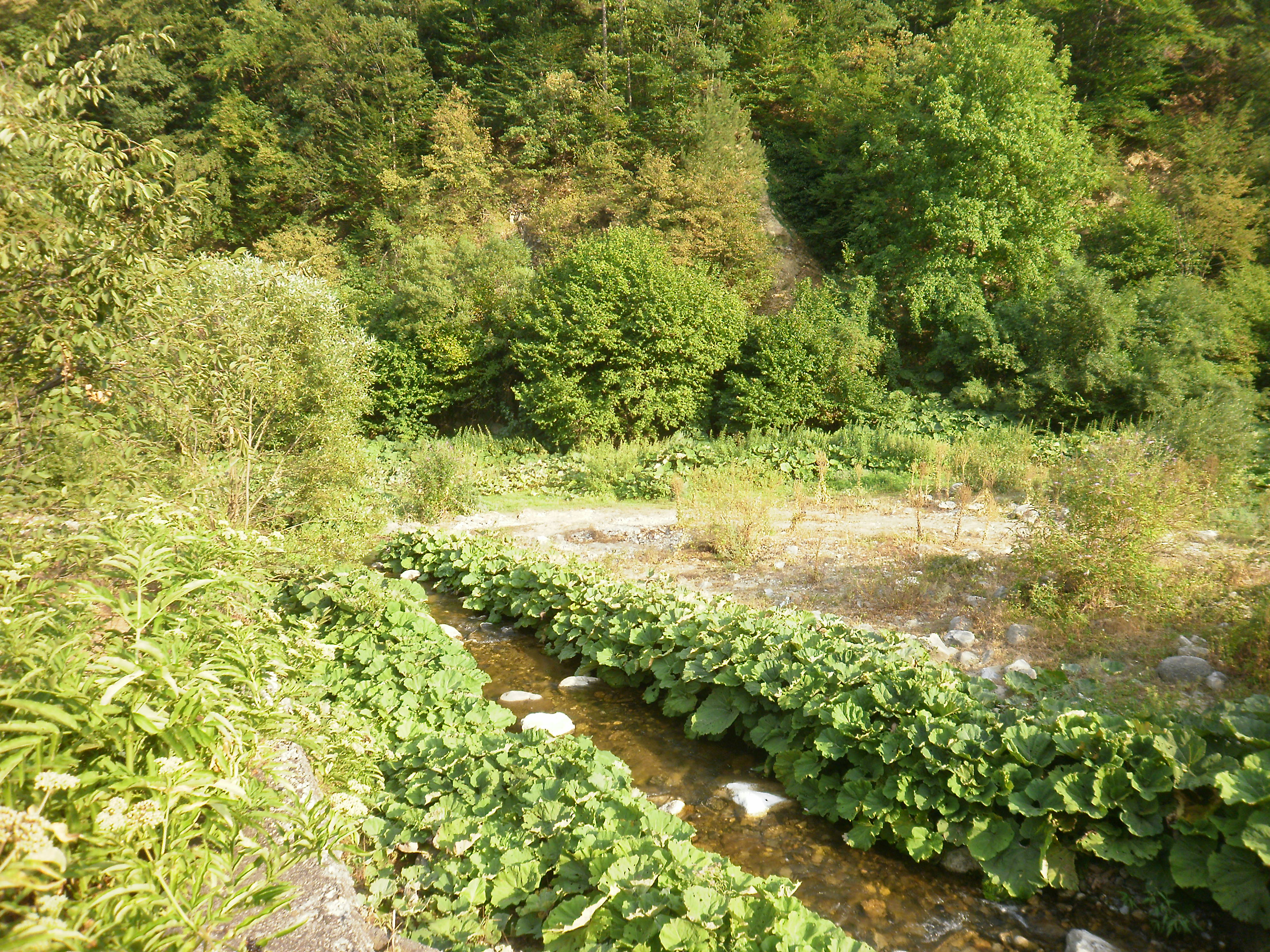

Location
- Country: Bulgaria

Physical characteristics
- Source
  - location: western Rhodope Mountains
  - coordinates: 42°52′50.88″N 24°8′40.92″E
  - elevation: 1,743 m (5,719 ft)
- Mouth
  - location: Maritsa
  - coordinates: 42°8′30.02″N 24°30′10.08″E
  - elevation: 183 m (600 ft)
- Length: 61 km (38 mi)
- Basin size: 350 km^{2} (140 sq mi)

Basin features
- Progression: Maritsa→ Aegean Sea

The Stara reka (Bulgarian: Стара река, meaning "Old River") is a 61 km-long river in southern Bulgaria, a right tributary of the river Maritsa.

== Geography ==
The river takes its source at an altitude of 1,743 m in the Batak Mountain of western Rhodope mountain range, 1.3 km west of the Kartela locality on the road between the towns of Batak and Dospat. Until the town of Peshtera it flows in a north-northeastern direction in a deep, at places canyon-like, valley which widens only in the area around Batak. At Peshtera its valley widens again and then enters another steep valley, crossing the northern foothills of the Rhodope Mountains. At the village of Byaga the valley of Stara Reka widens once again, winds around the Besaparski Hills from the south and east and enters the Upper Thracian Plain, where the river flows into the Maritsa at an altitude of 183 m west of the town of Stamboliyski.

Its drainage basin covers a territory of 350 km^{2} or 0.66% of Maritsa's total and borders the drainage basins of the Chepinska reka and several small tributaries of the Maritsa to the west and northwest and the Vacha to the east and south, all of them right tributaries of the Maritsa.

The Stara reka has predominantly rain-snow feed with high water in April–May and low water in September. The average annual flow at its mouth is 2.74 m^{3}/s.

== Settlements and economy ==
The river flows almost entirely in Pazardzhik Province; its final few kilometers are in Plovdiv Province. There are six settlements along its course: the towns of Batak and Peshtera and the villages of Byaga, Isperihovo, Kurtovo Konare and Novo Selo. There two main roads along its valley, a 17.3 km stretch of the second class II-37 road Yablanitsa–Pazardzhik–Dospat follows the Stara reka between Peshtera and Batak, and an 11.3 km stretch of the third class III-375 road Peshtera–Plovdiv follows its valley between Peshtera and Isperihovo. Almost the entire route of the Stamboliyski–Peshtera railway follows its lower course. The river's waters are utilised for irrigation and industrial water supply. Part of its waters are diverted via underground tunnel to the Batak Reservoir for electricity generation at the Batak Hydropower Cascade (254 MW).
