= Perushtitsa Municipality =

Coordinates: 42°03′N 24°33′E

Perushtitsa Municipality Община Перущица
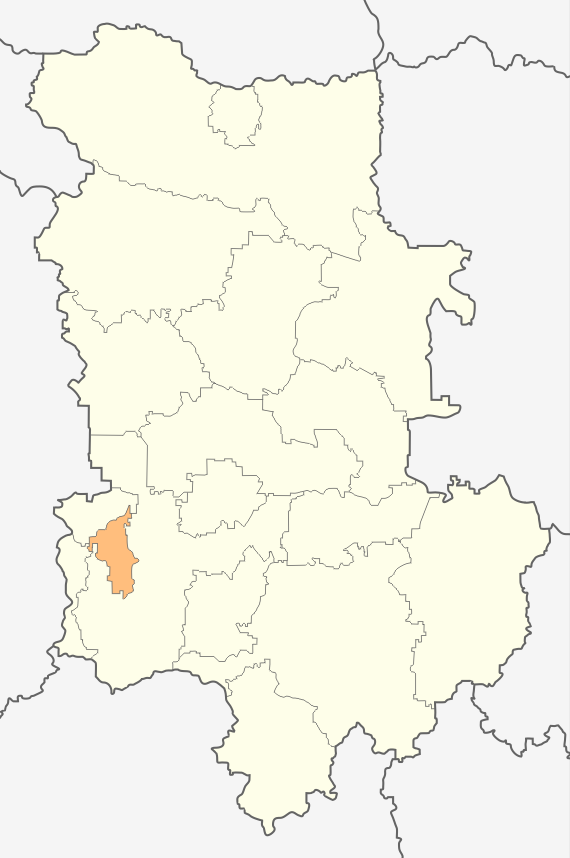
- Country: Bulgaria
- Province: Plovdiv Province
- Seat: Perushtitsa

Area
  - Total: 48.7 km^{2} (18.8 sq mi)

Population (2024)
  - Total: 4,148
  - Density: 85.2/km^{2} (221/sq mi)
- Website: perushtitsa.egov.bg/wps/portal/municipality-perushtitsa/home

Perushtitsa Municipality (Bulgarian: Община Перущица) is a municipality in Plovdiv Province, central Bulgaria. Covering a territory of 48.7 km^{2}, it is the smallest of the 18 municipalities in the province, encompassing 0.81% of its total area, and also the second smallest in the country, after Chelopech. It among the nine that contain a single settlement. It borders the municipalities of Stamboliyski to the northwest, Rodopi to the east, south and southeast, and Krichim to the west. Until 1998 Perushtitsa was part of Rodopi Municipality.

== Geography ==
The municipality has a flat topography to the north and mountainous to the south. The northern half lies in the south–central part of the Pazardzhik–Plovdiv Field, which constitutes the western half of the Upper Thracian Plain, where the lowest point at 184 m is located. To the south are located the northwestern edges of the Chernatitsa ridge of the Rhodope Mountains. There, at southernmost point of Perushtitsa Municipality on the boundary with the Rodopi Municipality, is its highest point, the summit of Sveti Georgi (1,191 m).

Perushtitsa Municipality falls within the transitional continental climatic zone. In direction southwest–northeast along the border with the municipalities of Krichim and Stamboliyski runs the river Vacha, a right tributary of the river Maritsa of the Aegean Sea drainage.

== Transport ==
Perushtitsa Municipality is traversed by a single road of the national network, a 4.9 km stretch of the third class III-8602 road. Perushtitsa is located some 24 km southwest of the regional center Plovdiv and 19 km south of the major Trakiya motorway (A1). With the addition of the local roads, the total length of the road network reaches 22.7 km. The length of the streets in Perushtitsa is 21.2 km.

== Demography ==
The population is 4,148 as of 2024. The municipal seat Perushtitsa is the only settlement of the administrative division.

== Gallery ==
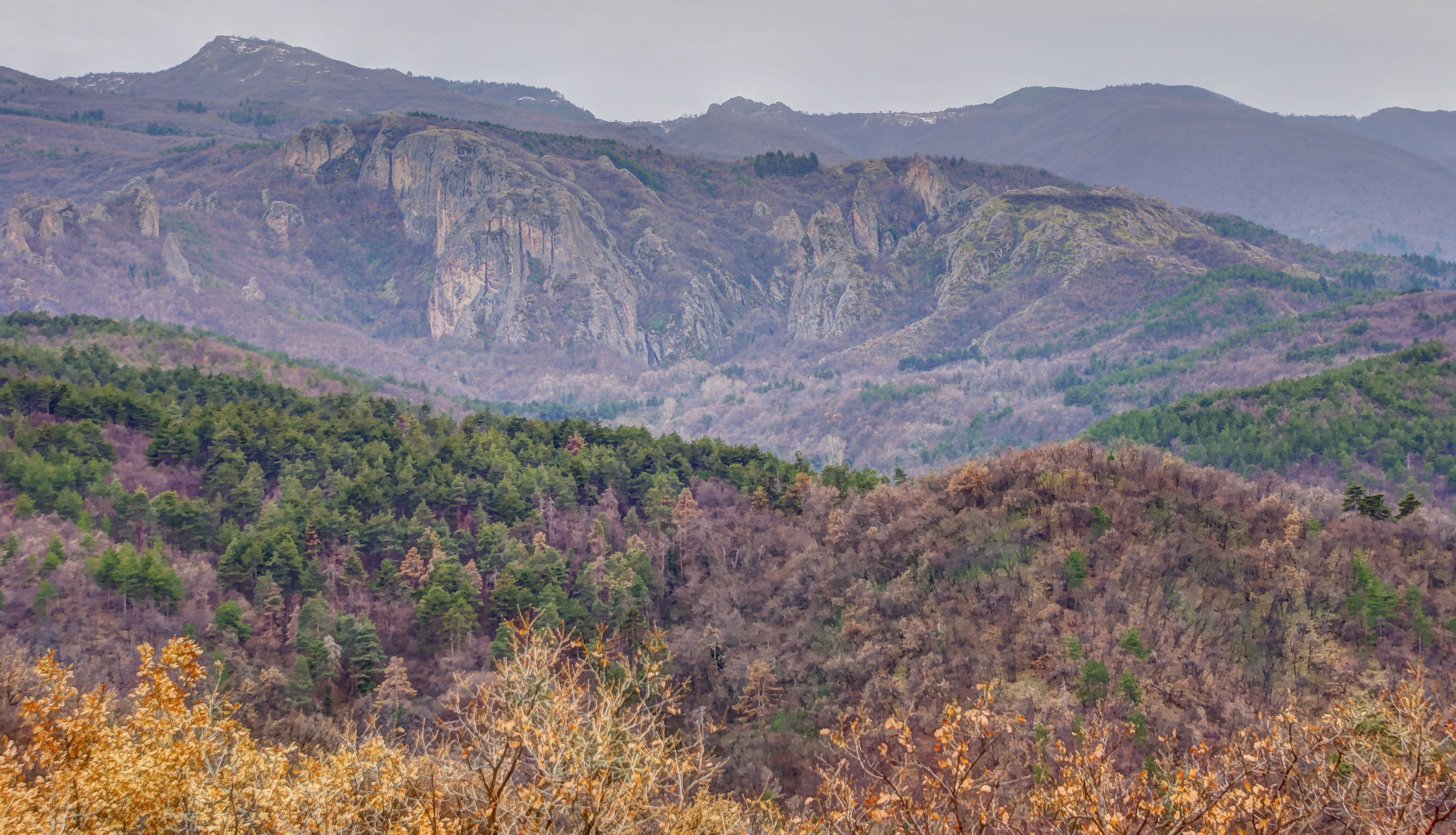
Perestitsa protected locality

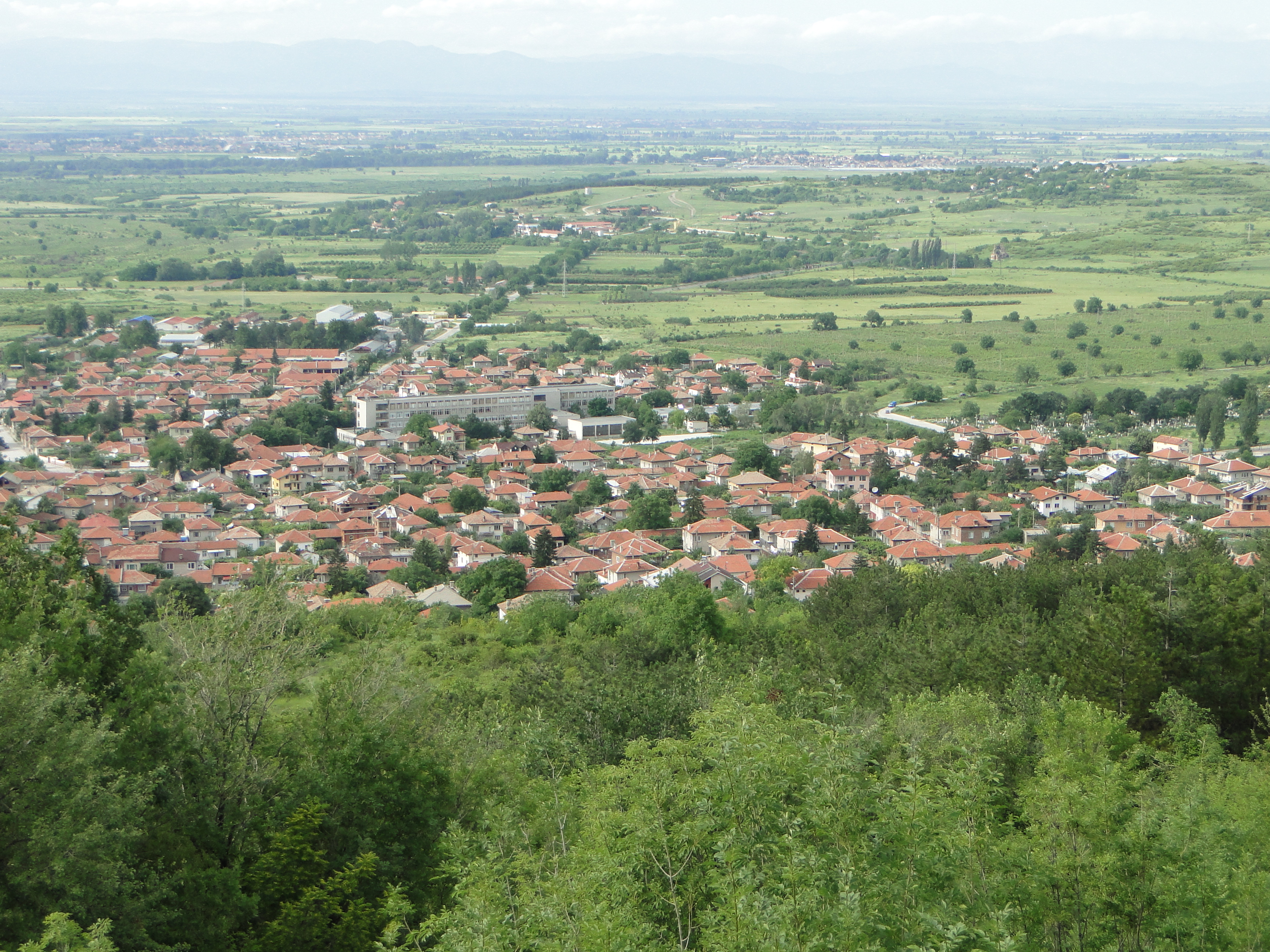
A view of Perushtitsa

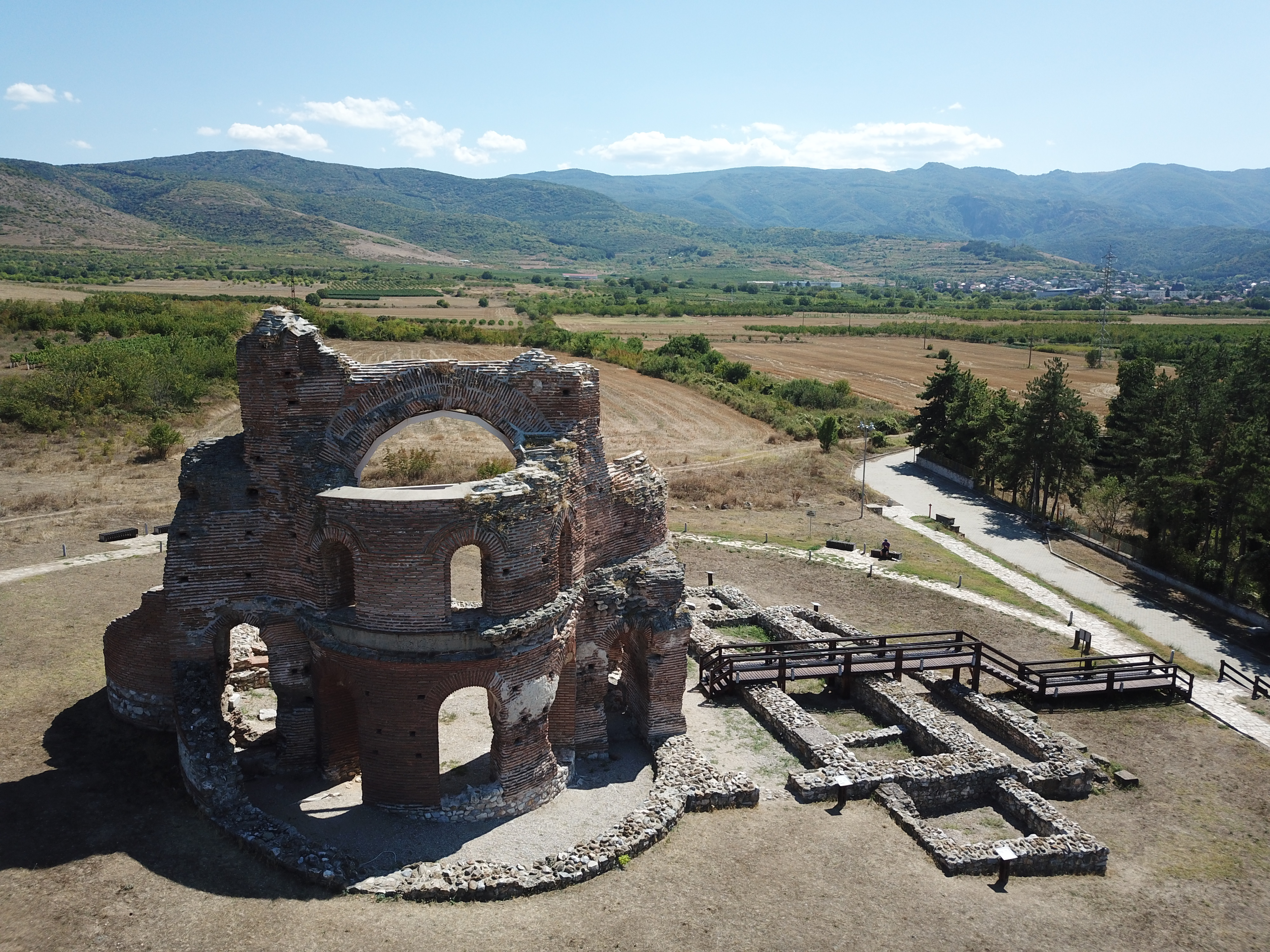
The ruins of the Red Church near Perushtitsa

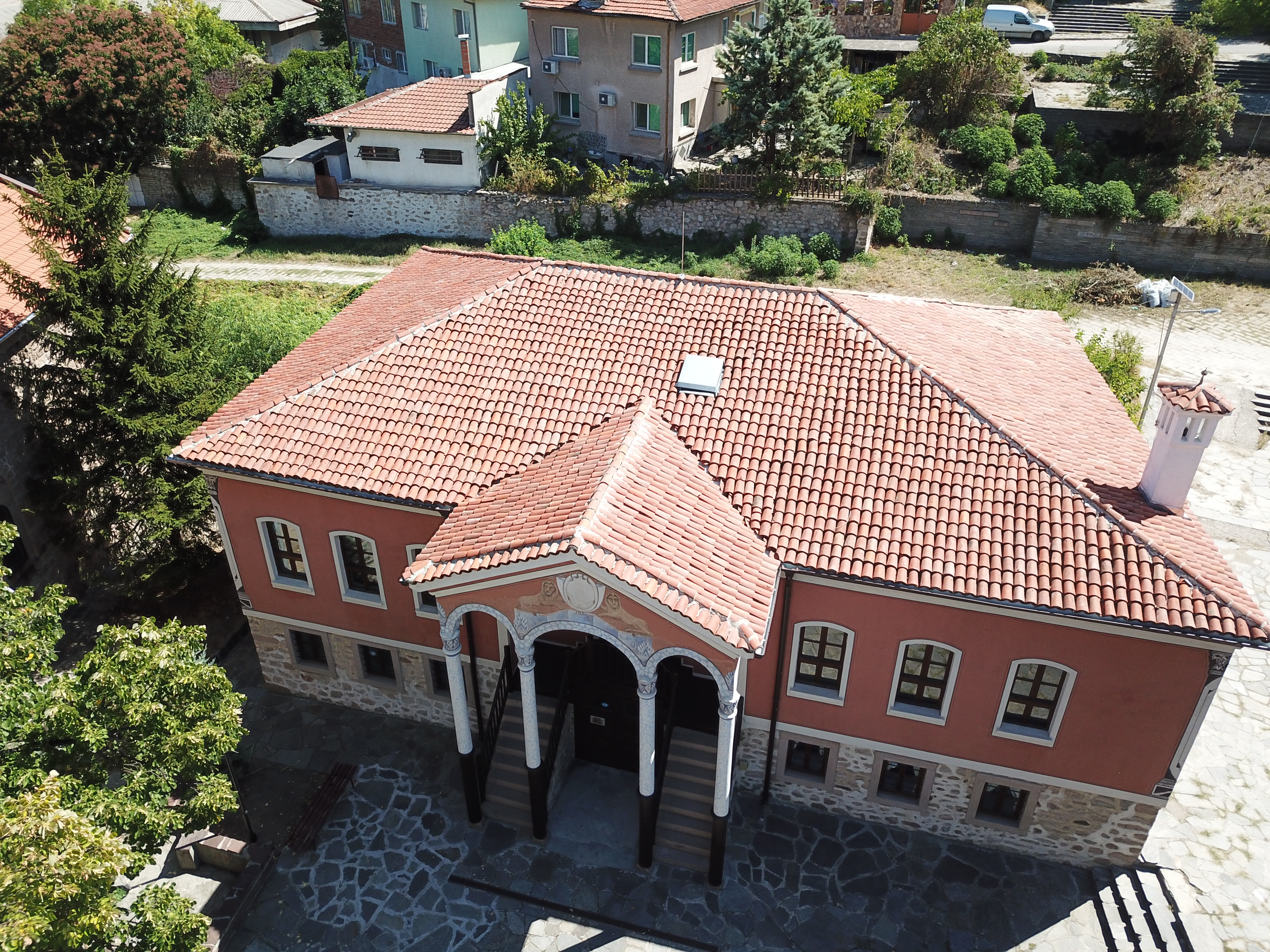
The Perushtitsa Art Gallery
