= Novo Selo, Plovdiv Province =

Village in Stamboliyski municipality, Plovdiv oblast, Bulgaria

Coordinates: 42.105°N 24.483°E

Novo Selo (Bulgarian: Ново село, meaning "new village") is a small village in southern Bulgaria. It is located in Stamboliyski Municipality in Plovdiv Province. Novo Selo is located on the north slope of the Rhodope Mountains.
