= Chelopech =

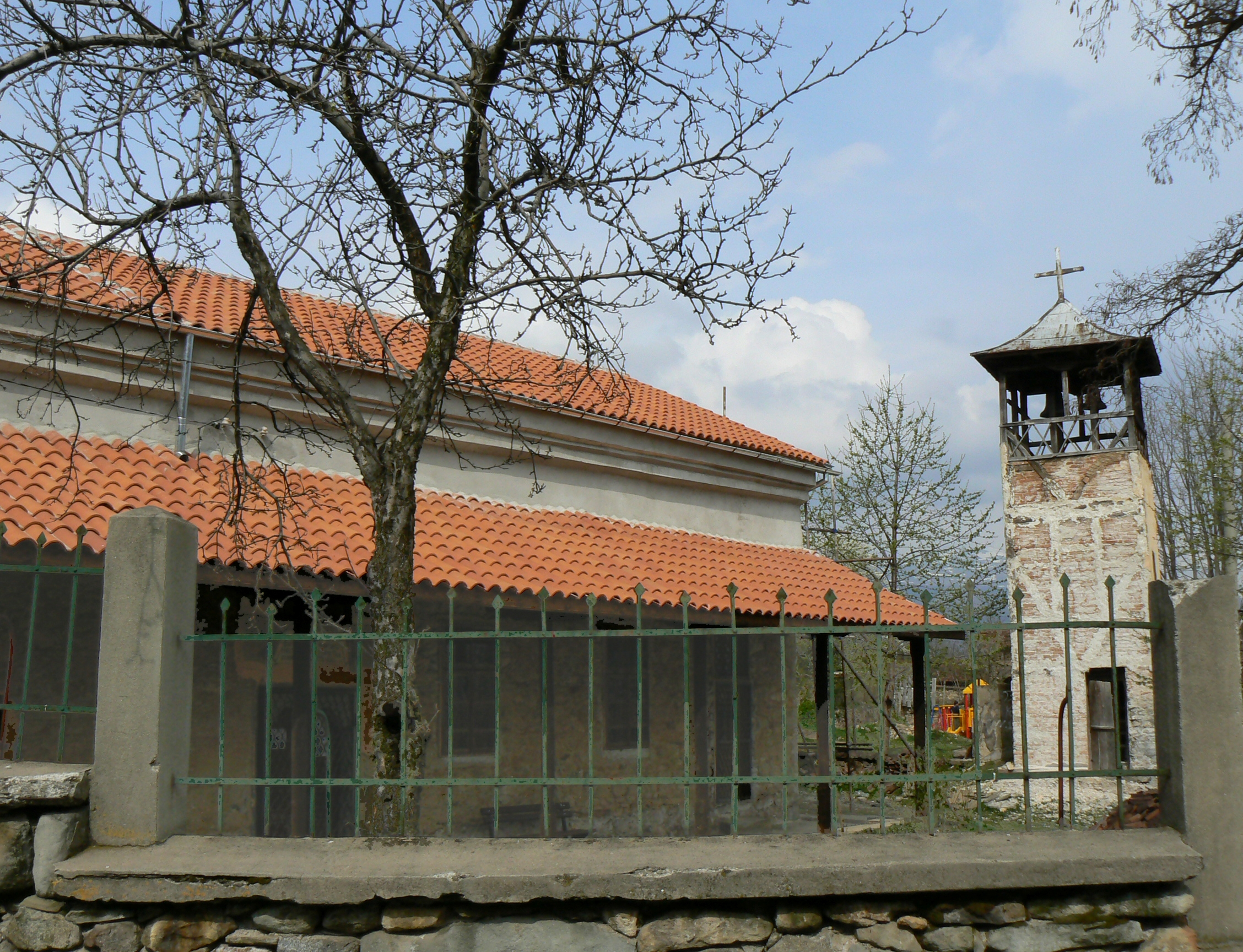

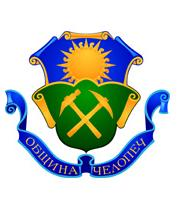
- Coat of arms

- Chelopech (Bulgaria)
- Coordinates: 42°42′N 24°5′E
- Country: Bulgaria
- Province: Sofia

Government
  - Mayor: Aleksi Kesiakov
- Elevation: 705 m (2,313 ft)

Population (15 December 2007)
  - Total: 1,767
- Time zone: UTC+2 (EET)
  - Summer (DST): UTC+3 (EEST)
- Postal code: 2087
- Area code: 07185

Chelopech (Bulgarian: Челопеч) is a village in the western part of Bulgaria. It is the only village in the Chelopech Municipality, Sofia Province.

== Geographical outline ==
Chelopech is situated in the Zlatitsa–Pirdop Valley enclosed between the Balkan Mountains to the north and Sredna Gora to the south. The major railroad connecting Sofia and Burgas passes through the village.

== History ==
The history of the village dates back to antiquity, which is proved by the remains, discovered on its territory - the "Ginova Mogila", "Gradishte", etc. The name of the village is first mentioned in a preserved Turkish document which dates back to the year 1430. It was designated an independent municipality on 15 August 1991.

Chelopech Hill on Trinity Peninsula in Antarctica is named after the village.

== Cultural and natural resources ==
The St. Nikolas the Wonderworker Church was built in 1835. The Municipality is in charge of the Murgana chalet, located at 1,350 metres (4,430 ft) above sea level at the foot of the Mourgana Peak in the Balkan Mountains.

== Demographics ==
According to December 2018, there are 1,526 people residing in Chelopech, most of whom ethnic Bulgarians (95%), followed by Romani people (4%).

=== Religion ===
According to the latest Bulgarian census of 2011, the religious composition, among those who answered the optional question on religious identification, was the following:

Religious composition of Chelopech Municipality
Orthodox Christianity	86.2%
Catholicism	0.4%
Protestantism	1.4%
Islam	0.0%
No religion	9.2%
Prefer not to answer, others and indefinable	2.8%

An overwhelming majority of the population of Chelopech Municipality identify themselves as Christians. At the 2011 census, 86.2% of respondents identified as Orthodox Christians belonging to the Bulgarian Orthodox Church.

== Industry ==
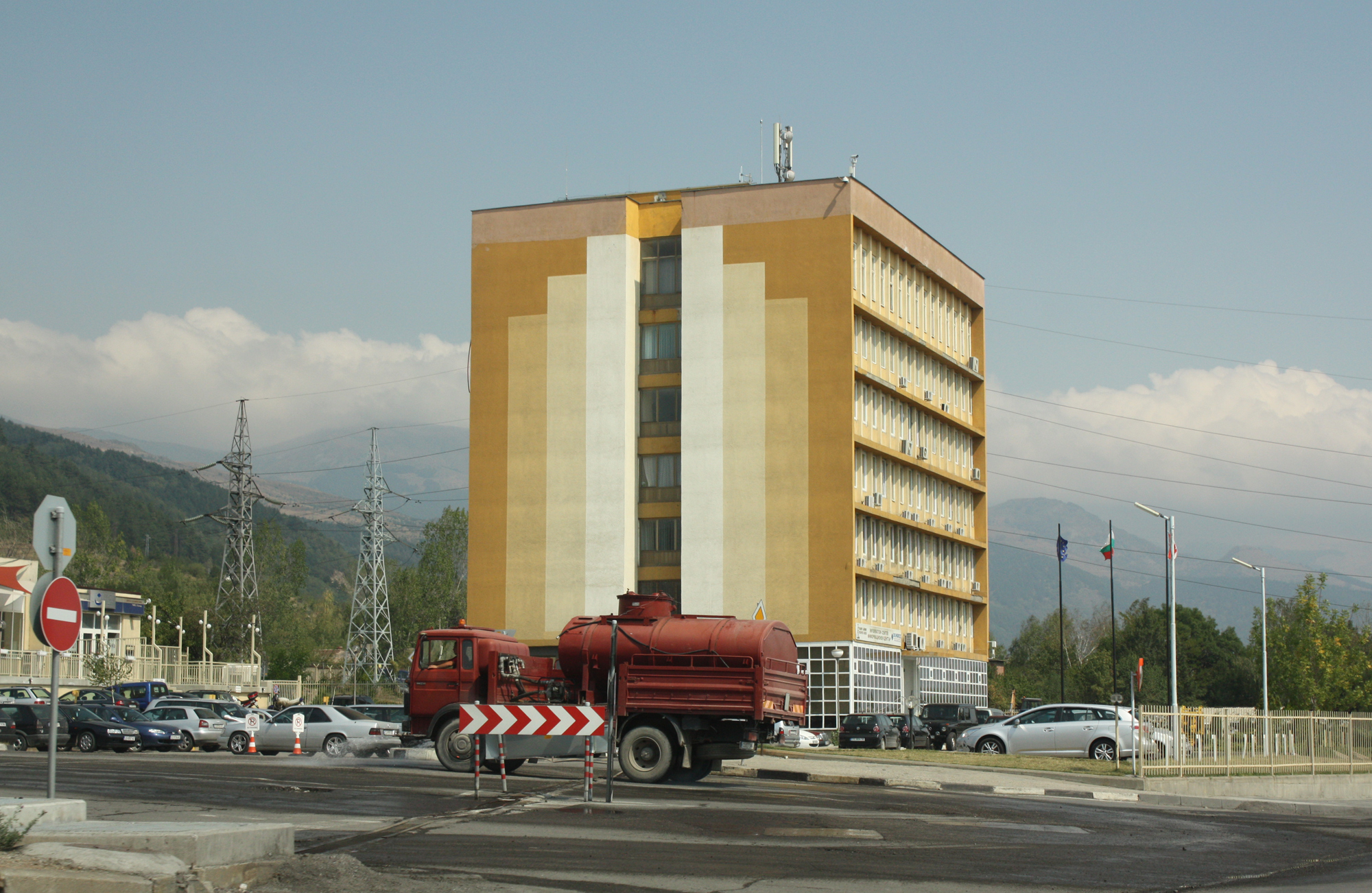
Dundee Precious Metals Inc. Building in Chelopech

Copper mining is the main branch of the local producing structure. Chelopech is the biggest and richest copper-gold-pyrites deposit in Europe, which is one of the reasons for the stable economic situation in the region.

== Gallery ==
Chelopech

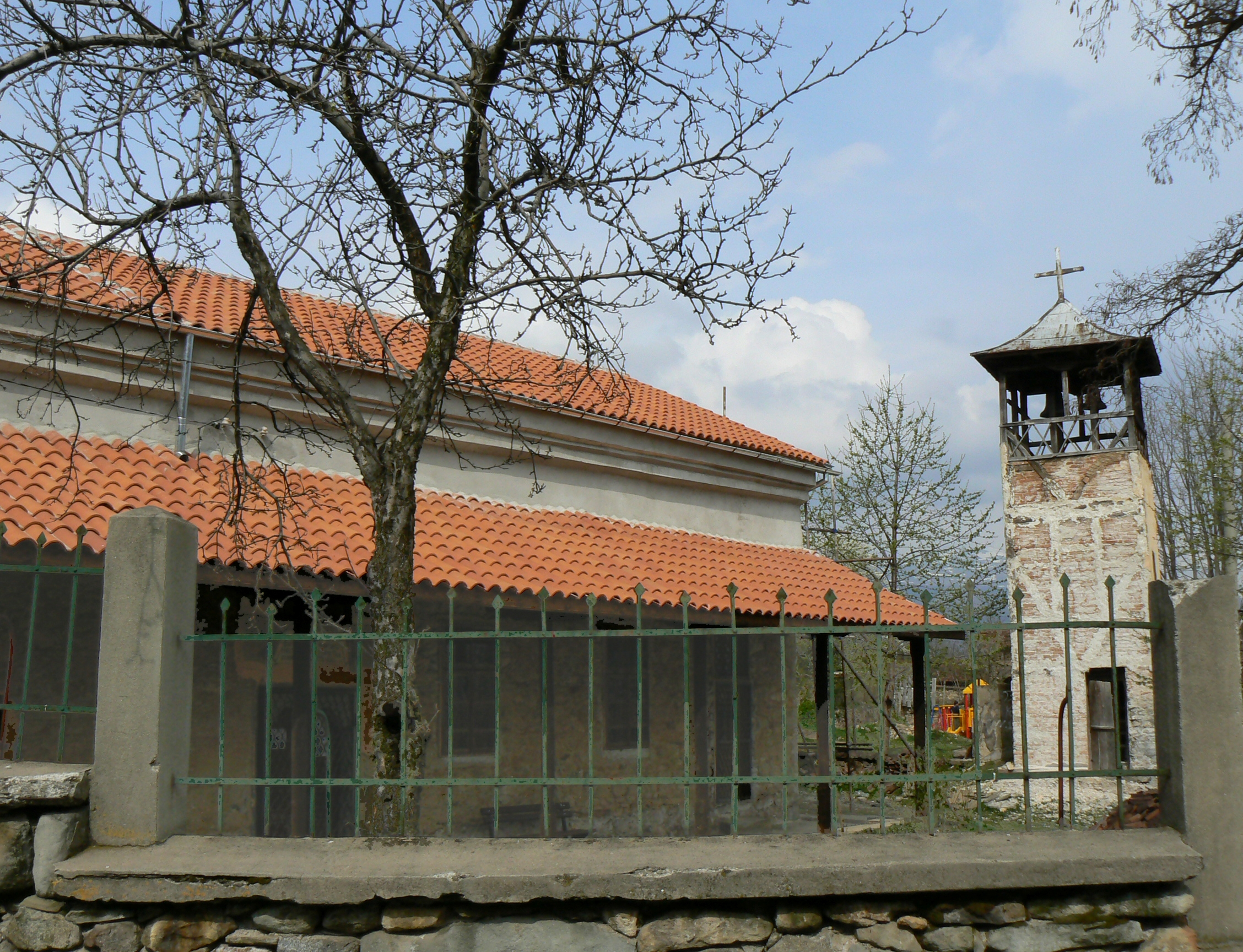
St Nikolay Church

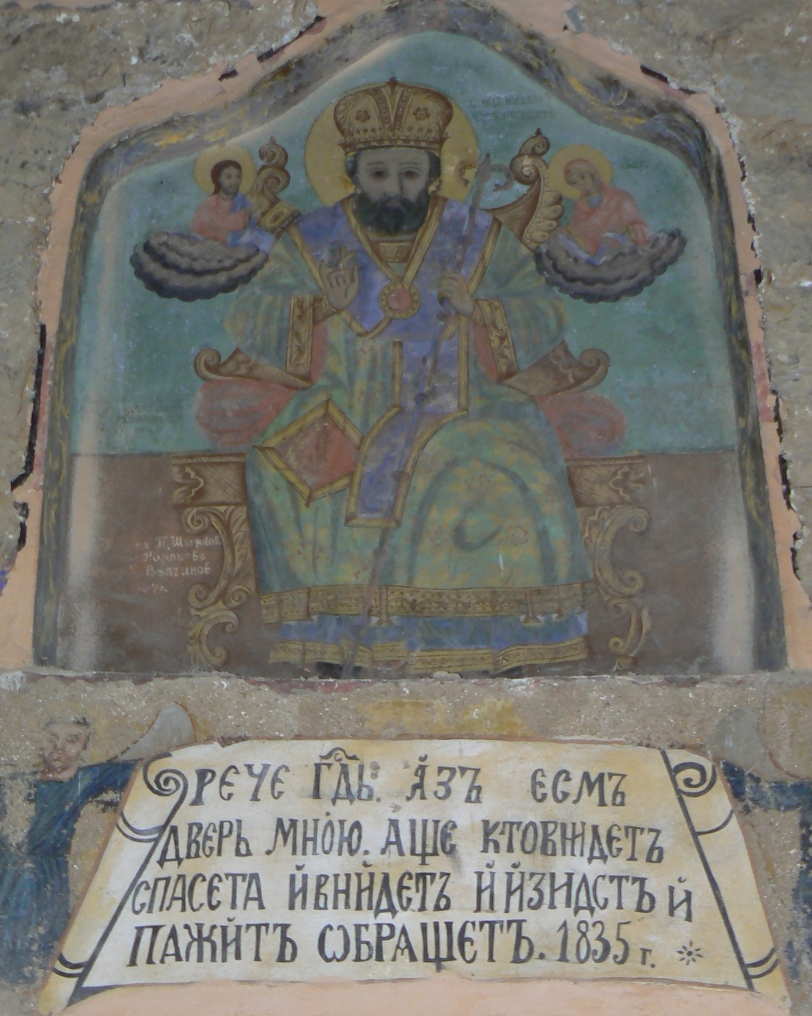
The inscription above the church door

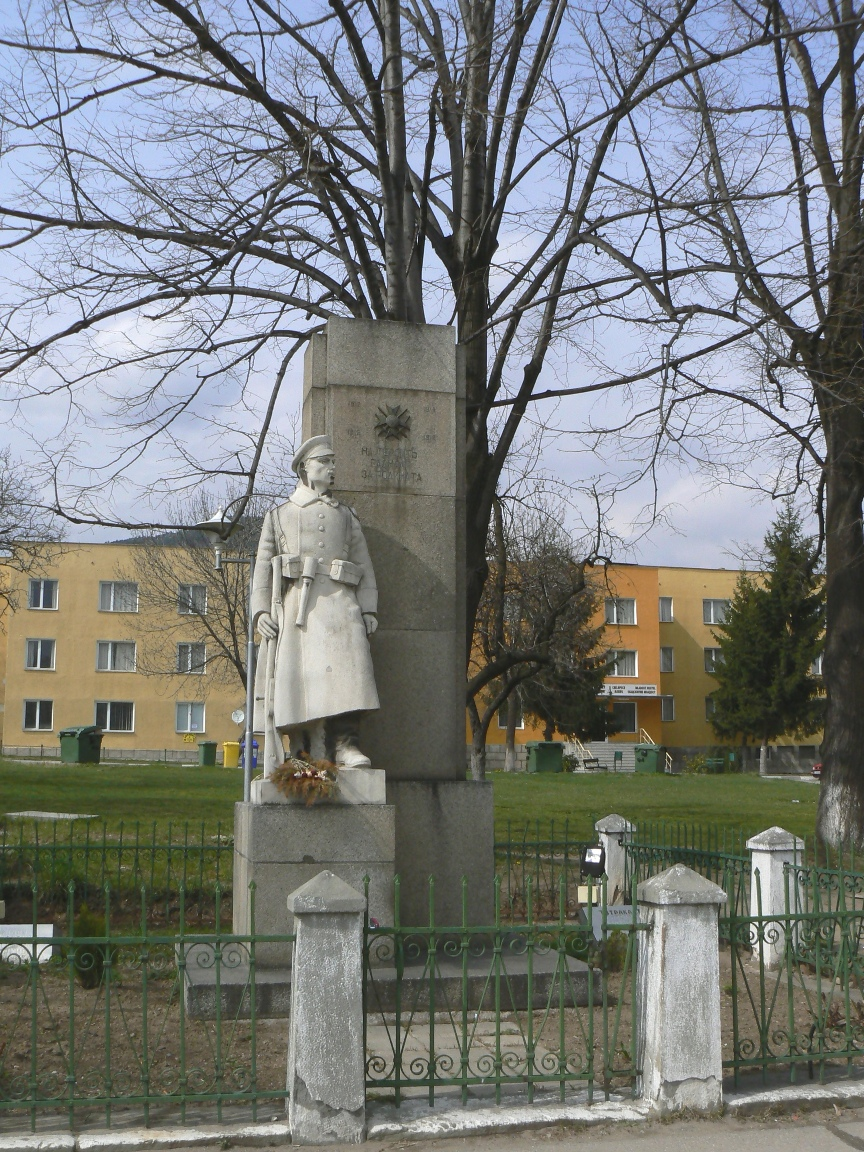
A monument to the fallen in the wars

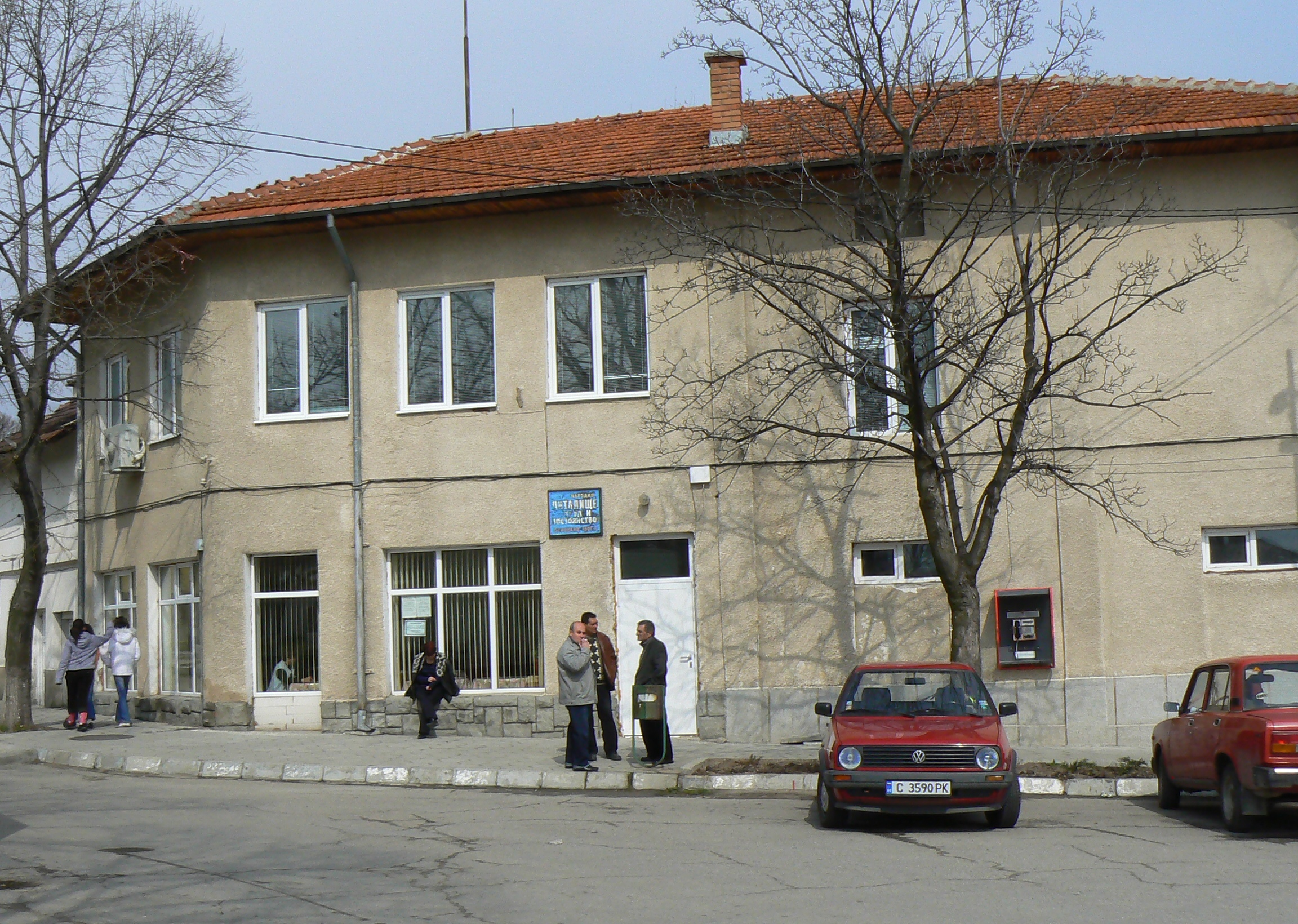
The chitalishte.
