= Chelopech Municipality =

Coordinates: 42.7000°N 24.0830°E

Chelopech Municipality Община Челопеч
- Municipality
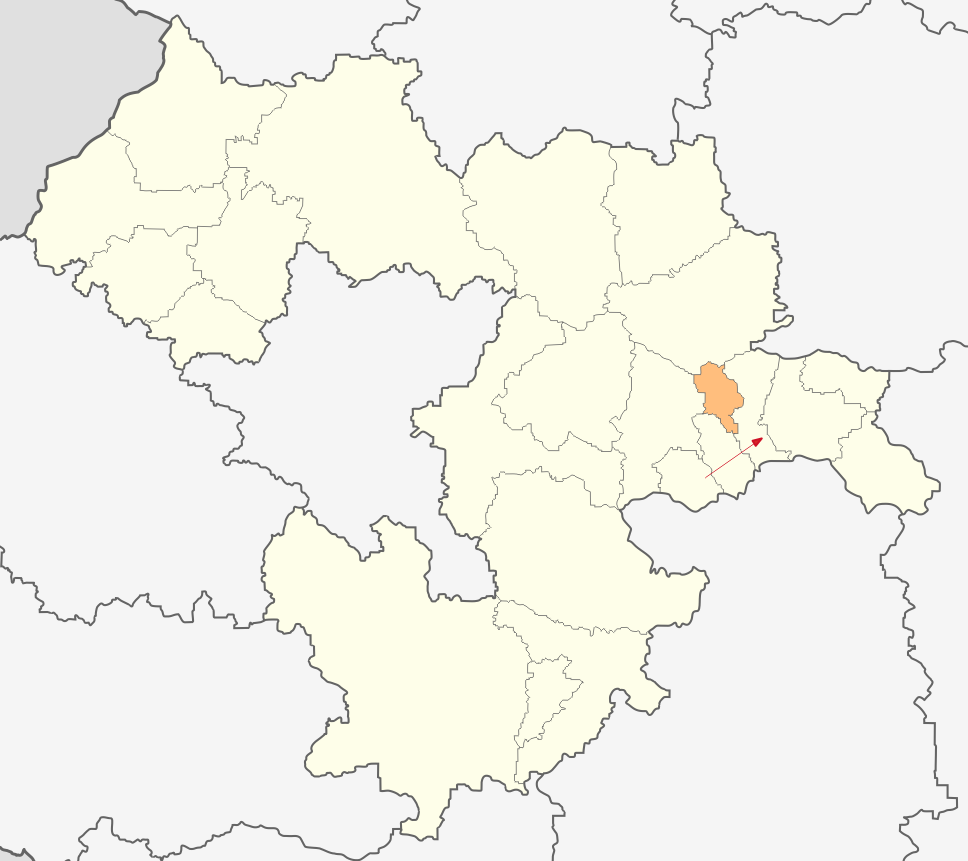
- Country: Bulgaria
- Province: Sofia Province
- Seat: Chelopech

Chelopech Municipality is a municipality in Sofia Province, Bulgaria.

The Chelopech Municipality includes only one village - Chelopech, which is located on the southern side of the Balkan Mountains, on the main road from the capital Sofia to Burgas. It borders Zlatitsa Municipality, Chavdar Municipality, Mirkovo Municipality and Etropole Municipality.

== Demographics ==
According to December 2018, there are 1,526 people residing in Chelopech, most of whom ethnic Bulgarians (95%), followed by Romani people (4%).

=== Religion ===
According to the latest Bulgarian census of 2011, the religious composition, among those who answered the optional question on religious identification, was the following:

Religious composition of Chelopech Municipality
Orthodox Christianity	86.2%
Catholicism	0.4%
Protestantism	1.4%
Islam	0.0%
No religion	9.2%
Prefer not to answer, others and indefinable	2.8%

An overwhelming majority of the population of Chelopech Municipality identify themselves as Christians. At the 2011 census, 86.2% of respondents identified as Orthodox Christians belonging to the Bulgarian Orthodox Church.
