= Stamboliyski =

Stamboliyski Стамболийски
- Location of Stamboliyski
- Coordinates: 42°8′N 24°32′E
- Country: Bulgaria
- Province (Oblast): Plovdiv

Government
  - Mayor: Ivan Yakov

Population (2011)
  - Total: 11,601
- Time zone: UTC+2 (EET)
  - Summer (DST): UTC+3 (EEST)
- Postal Code: 4210
- Area code: 0339

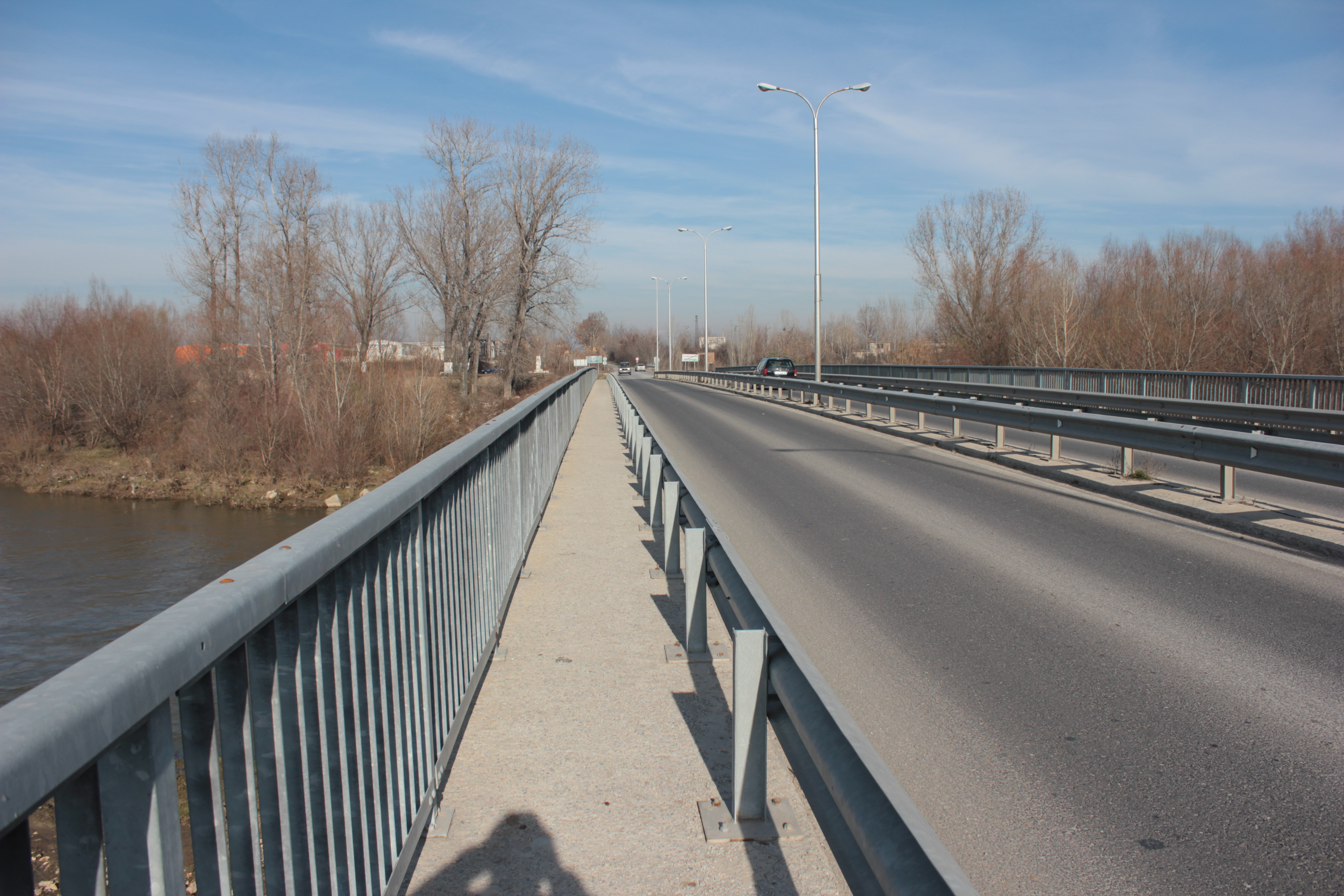
The bridge over Maritsa river at Stamboliyski

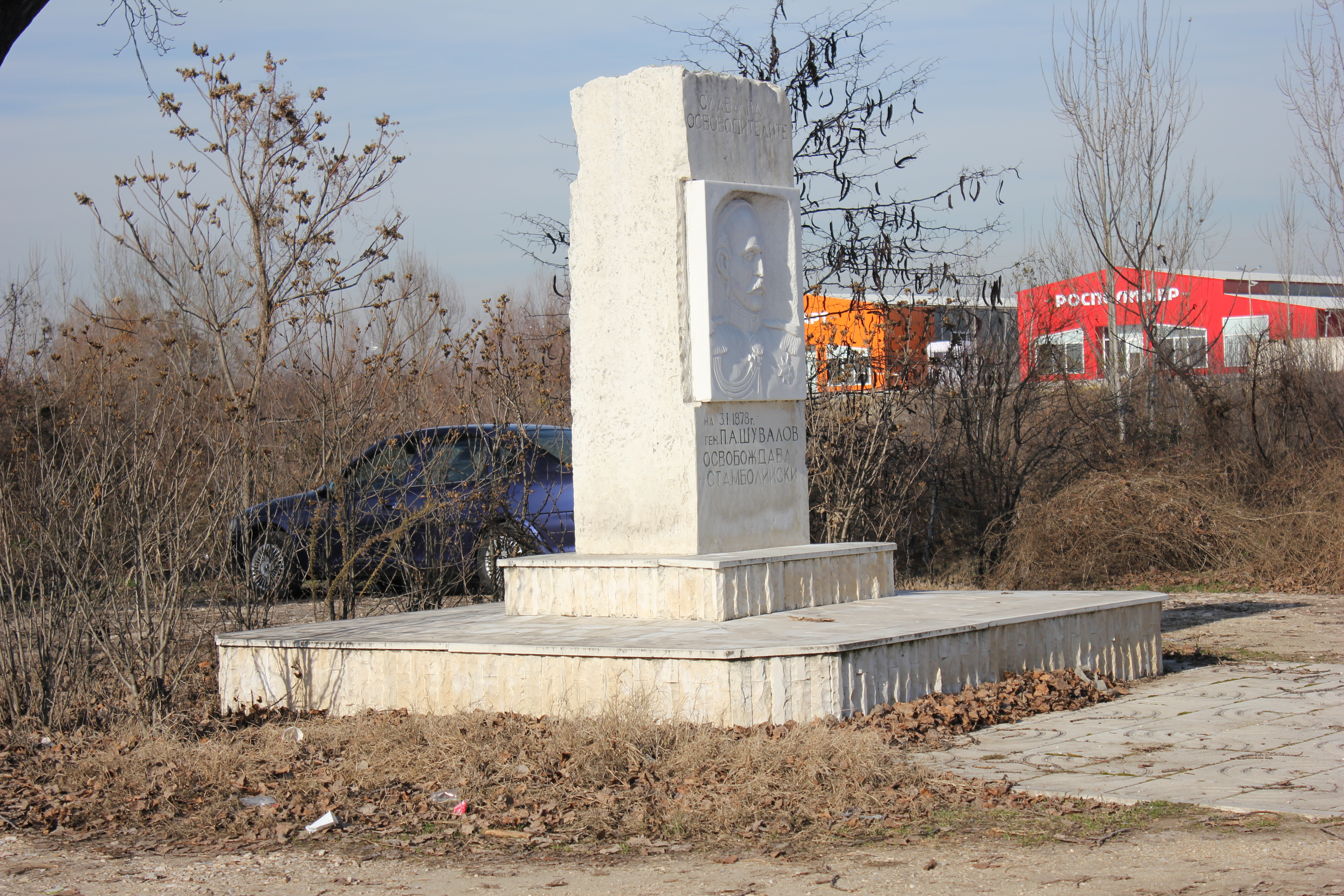
Memorial of General Shuvalov who in 1878 liberated Stamboliyski (then Gara Krichim)

Stamboliyski (Bulgarian: Стамболийски [stɐmboˈlijski]) is a town in Plovdiv Province, southern Bulgaria. It is located on the Maritsa river. Stamboliyski was founded in 1873–75, when the Istanbul-Belovo railway was built. It was initially called Gara Krichim ('Krichim Station') after the largest village in the vicinity then, Krichim.

== History ==
The first settlers came from Brestovitsa and Perushtitsa, which together with railway workers from Peshtera established a village north of the railway line, which in 1926 had 224 residents. Refugees from the parts of Thrace and Macedonia under foreign rule arrived in 1926–1928 and the population grew to 554 in 1934. Industrialists from the larger cities founded factories in Gara Krichim and the village developed into a regional centre of industry and transport. It was proclaimed a town in 1964, and after the village of Krichim also acquired town status in 1969, it was renamed Novi Krichim ('New Krichim'). In 1979, the name was changed to Stamboliyski in honour of Aleksandar Stamboliyski, a former Prime Minister of Bulgaria and agrarian leader.

== Culture ==
Once a year there is a celebration of the city, which lasts for three days. The date changes each year according to the Holy Spirit religious holiday. Every Saturday there is a market near the center.

== Public institutions ==
Schools

- School "Hristo Botev"
- School "Otets Paisiy"
- School "Hristo Smirnenski"

Community Center

Community Center Vaptsarov offers the following activities:

- Youth Dance Ensemble "Yuzhnyache"
- Kids' Vocal Studio
- Schools ballet and art and music schools
- Courses in English and German
- Football team "Thrace"

Sport

The town of Stamboliyski is home to Taekwondo Club Trakiets and has sport clubs for wrestling, boxing, football, table tennis and Zumba.
