= Zavet (town) =

Zavet Завет
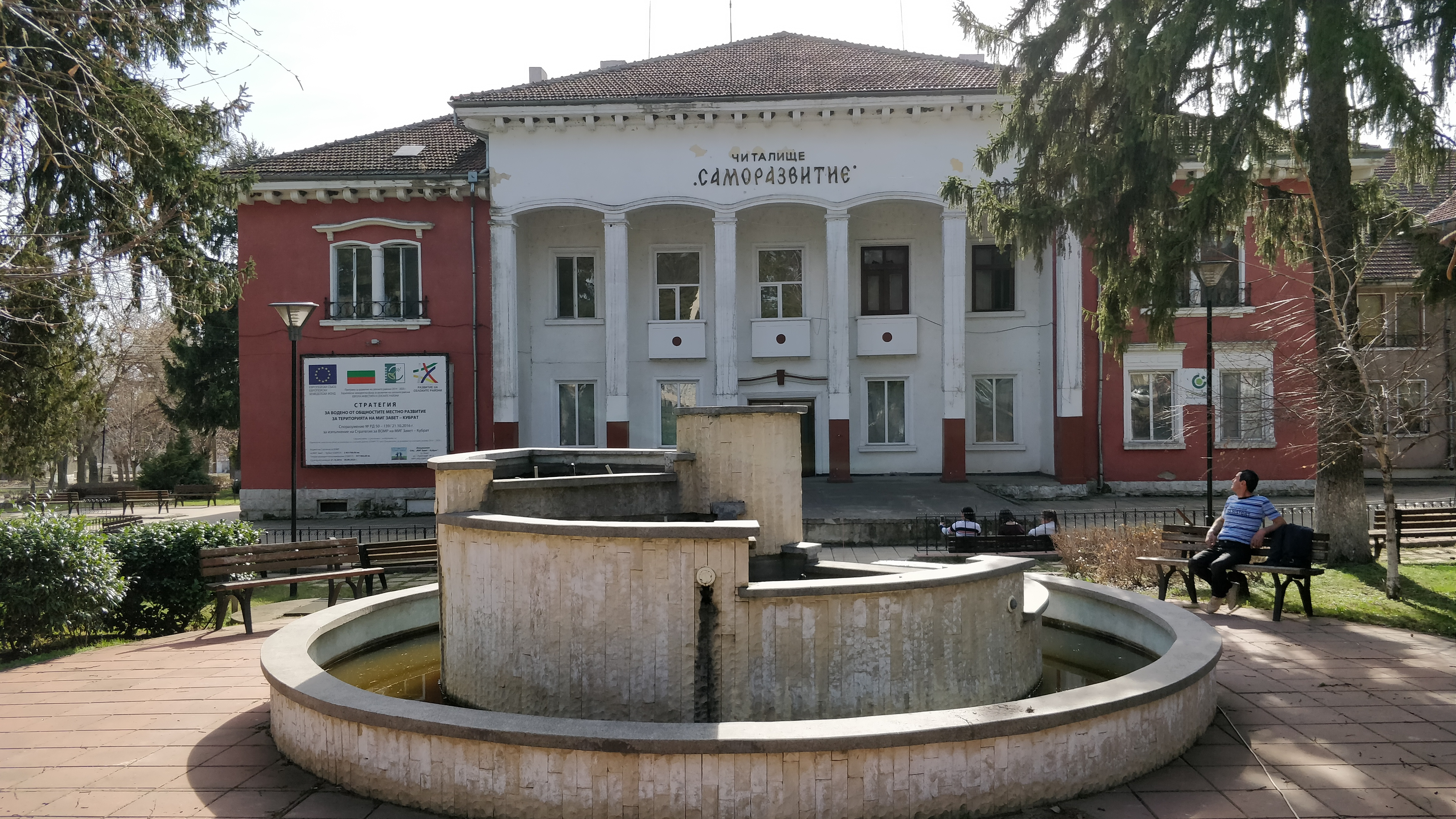
- Chitalishte of the town at the centre

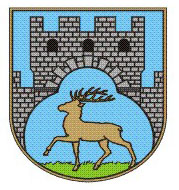
- Seal

- Location of Zavet
- Coordinates: 43°46′N 26°40′E
- Country: Bulgaria
- Provinces (Oblast): Razgrad

Government
  - Mayor: Ahter Veliev
- Elevation: 265 m (869 ft)

Population (2008)
  - Total: 3,585
- Time zone: UTC+2 (EET)
  - Summer (DST): UTC+3 (EEST)
- Postal Code: 7330
- Area code: 08342

Zavet (Bulgarian: Завет, pronounced [ˈzavɛt]; Turkish: Zavut) is a town in northeastern Bulgaria, part of Razgrad Province and located in the geographic region of Ludogorie. It is the administrative centre of the homonymous Zavet Municipality, which lies in the northern part of Razgrad Province. Zavet is situated in the western Ludogorie Plateau, 12 kilometres from Isperih and Kubrat, and 35 kilometres from Tutrakan and Razgrad.

Zavet used to be a village in the 1970s, when Ostrovo was the municipal centre. In 1974, Zavet was promoted to the municipal centret, thus depriving Ostrovo of its status.

== Municipality ==
Zavet municipality includes the following 7 places:

- Brestovene
- Ivan Shishmanovo
- Ostrovo
- Prelez
- Sushevo
- Veselets
- Zavet

== Honour ==
Zavet Saddle on Smith Island, South Shetland Islands is named after Zavet.

== Gallery ==
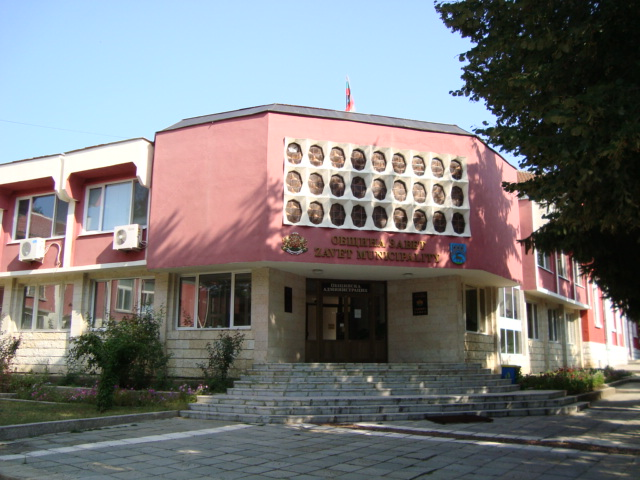
Municipality building

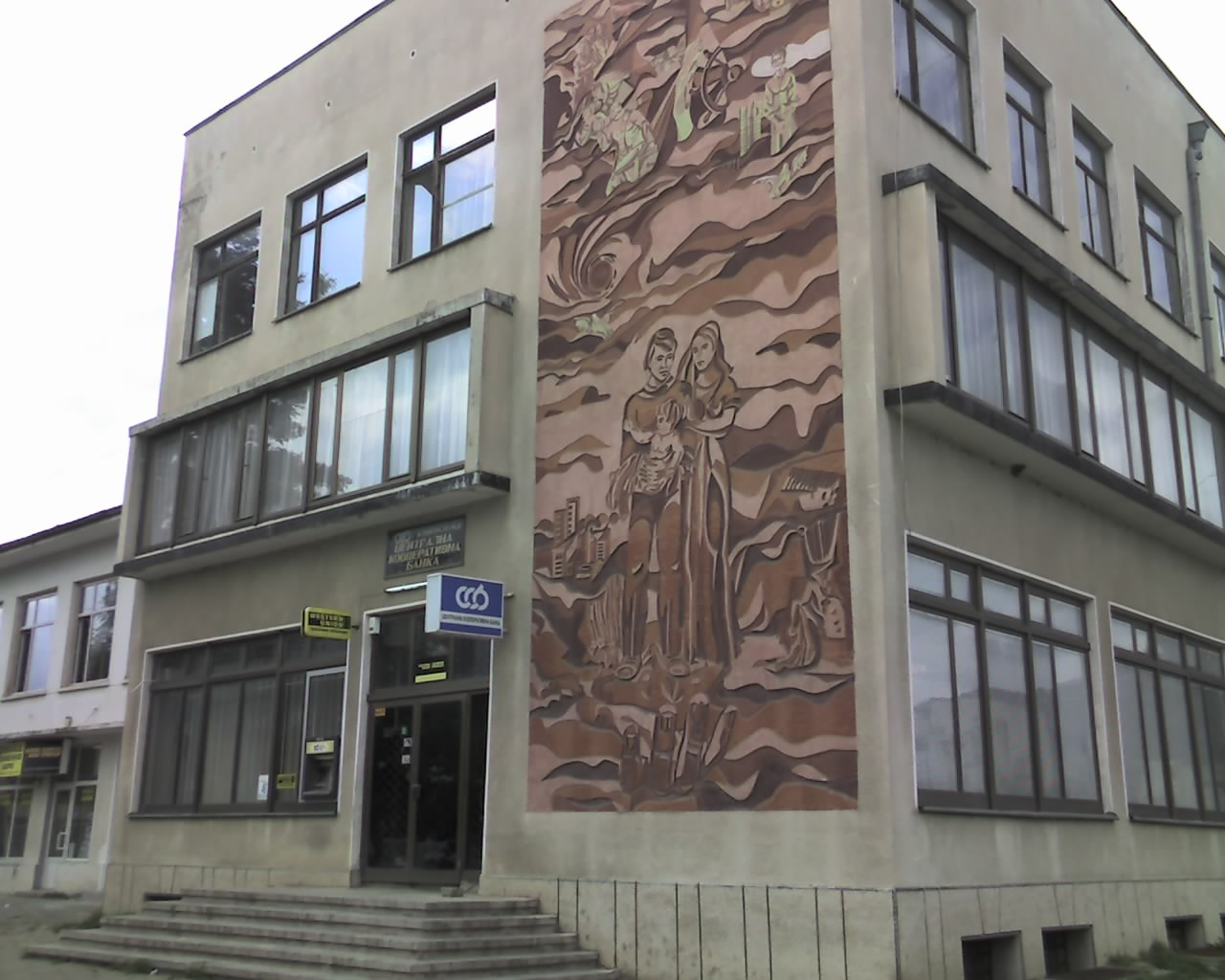
A building in the centre of the town
