= Konevo =

Konevo may refer to:

- Konevo, Kardzhali Province, Bulgaria
- Konevo, Razgrad Province, a populated place in Isperih Municipality, Bulgaria
- Konevo, Shumen Province, Bulgaria
- Konevo, Russia, a list of rural localities in Russia
