= Samuil =

Samuil may refer to:

- Samuel of Bulgaria, tsar from 997 to 1014
- Samuil Municipality, municipality in Bulgaria
  - Samuil (village), its administrative centre
- Sawyl Penuchel, British king of the sub-Roman period
