= Zavet =

Zavet may refer to:

- Zavet Municipality, a municipality in Razgrad Province, Bulgaria
- Zavet (town), a town in Zavet Municipality, Razgrad Province, Bulgaria
- Zavet (village), a village in Sungurlare Municipality, Burgas Province, Bulgaria
- Promise Me This (Serbian: Zavet), a 2007 Serbian film

or:

- Zavet Saddle, a saddle of elevation in Imeon Range
