= Demir Baba Teke =

Alevi mausoleum in Bulgaria

Coordinates: 43.73863°N 26.75196°E

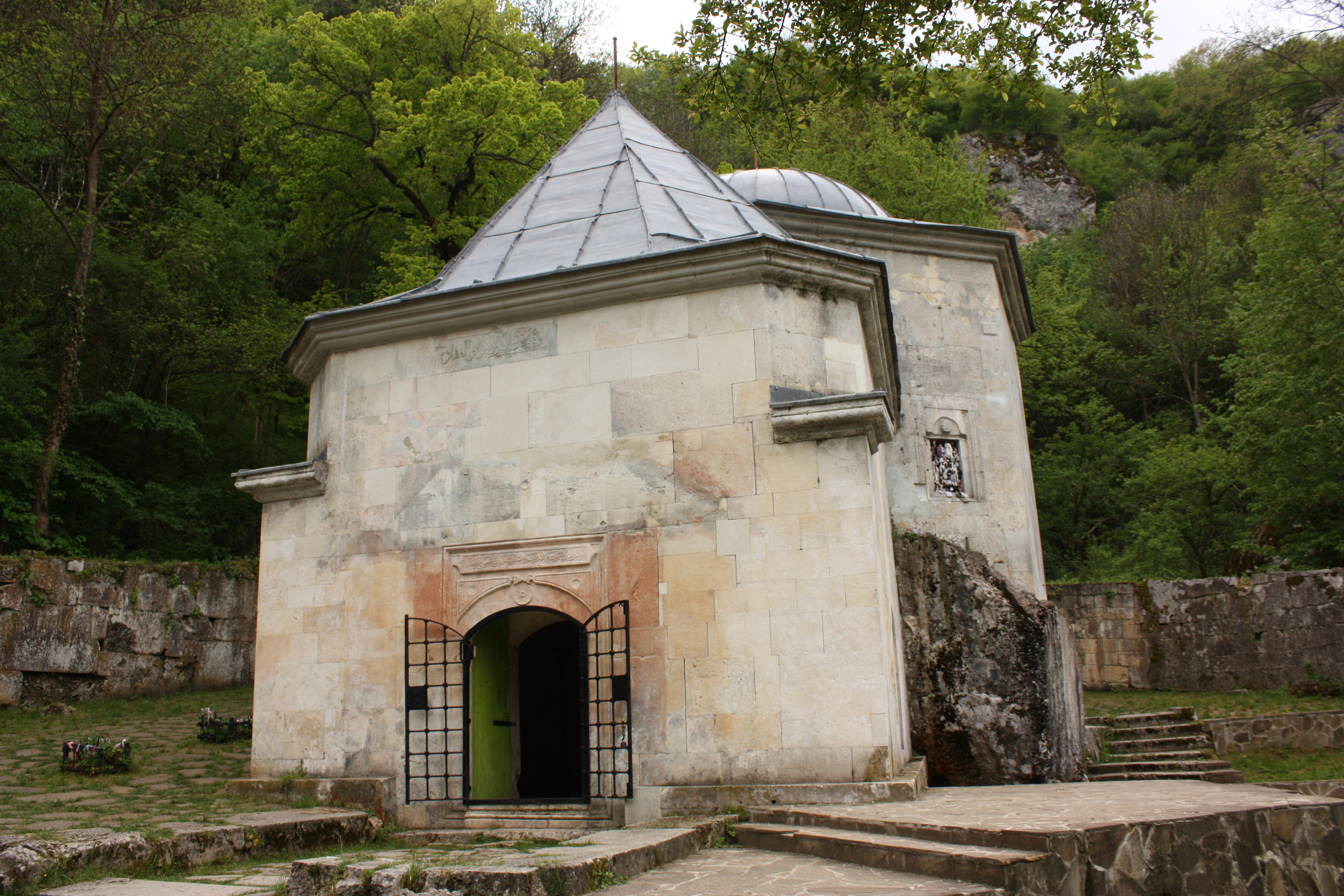
Frontal view of Demir Baba Teke, known as the most sacred place for Alians.

Demir Baba Teke (Bulgarian: Демир баба теке; Turkish: Demir Baba Tekkesi) is a 16th-century Alevi mausoleum (türbe) near the village of Sveshtari, Isperih municipality, Razgrad Province in northeastern Bulgaria. As part of the Sboryanovo historical and archaeological reserve, Demir Baba Teke is one of the 100 Tourist Sites of Bulgaria.

The mausoleum is thought to be the resting place of Demir Baba, a 16th-century Alevi saint. The tomb itself is a heptagonal building constructed out of local sandstone. It has a lower rectangular antechamber and is covered by a hemispherical dome 11 metres (36 ft) in height. Demir Baba's grave lies in the middle of the heptagonal inner premises. Constructed out of bricks and wood, the sarcophagus is 3.74 metres (12.3 ft) in length and is positioned with the saint's head pointing southwest. The sarcophagus is usually entirely covered by gifts and is only rarely displayed to Alevi pilgrims.

The mausoleum is thought to have been constructed in the 16th century on what was probably an ancient Thracian holy site from the 4th century BC. A cult complex (tekke) gradually emerged around the türbe. This included a holy spring, a mosque that was mentioned by travellers in the 18th and 19th centuries but was then destroyed, and a wooden public kitchen (imaret) which was pulled down in 1976 due to its deteriorating condition. The tekke features that have survived until today are the mausoleum, the holy spring, a residential building and a low stone fence surrounding the complex. A small exhibition in the residential building explains the story of the Alevis and Demir Baba himself.

Demir Baba Teke was proclaimed a monument of culture of local importance in 1970 by the government of the then-People's Republic of Bulgaria. The mausoleum was renovated in 1991–1994: the decaying wooden floor was replaced with a new one and the building's interior decorative elements (including the 19th-century murals) were reconstructed.

== Gallery ==
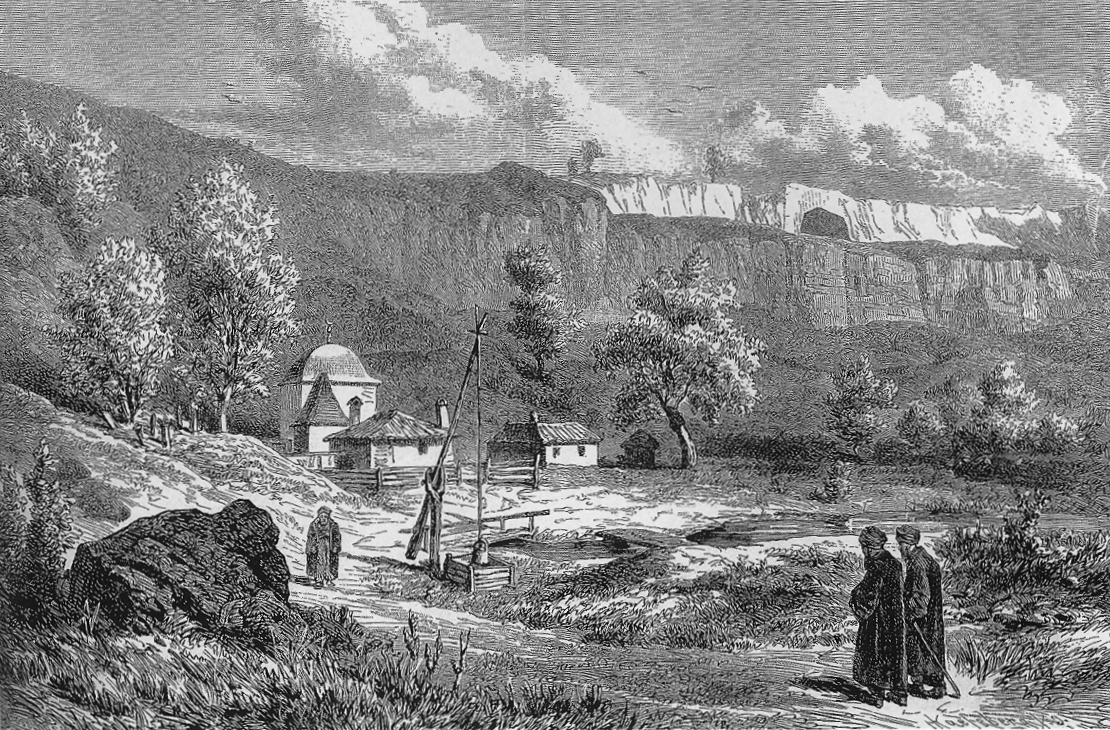
Demir Baba Teke as seen by Austrian traveller Felix Philipp Kanitz in the 19th century

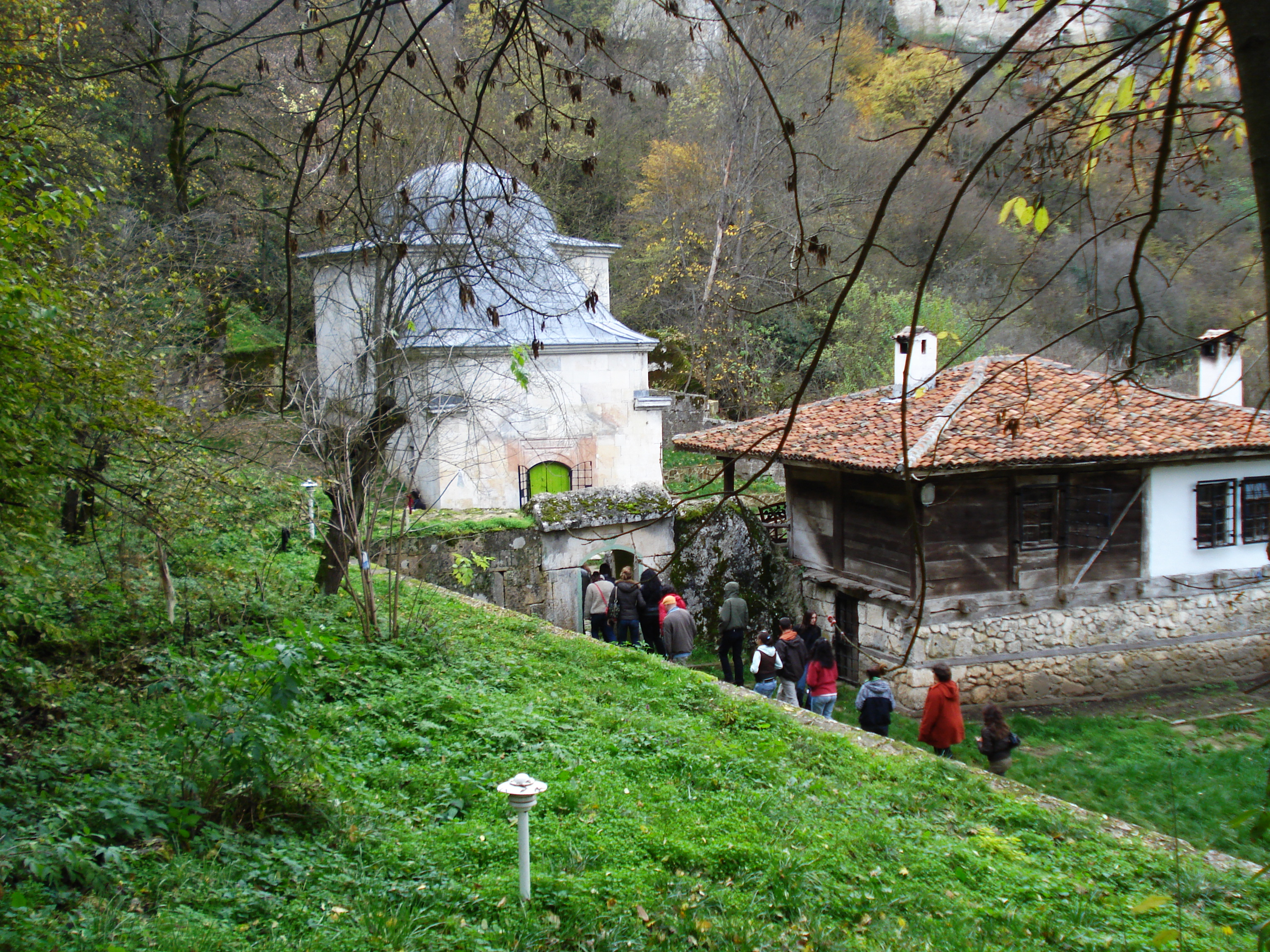
View towards the entrance of the mausoleum

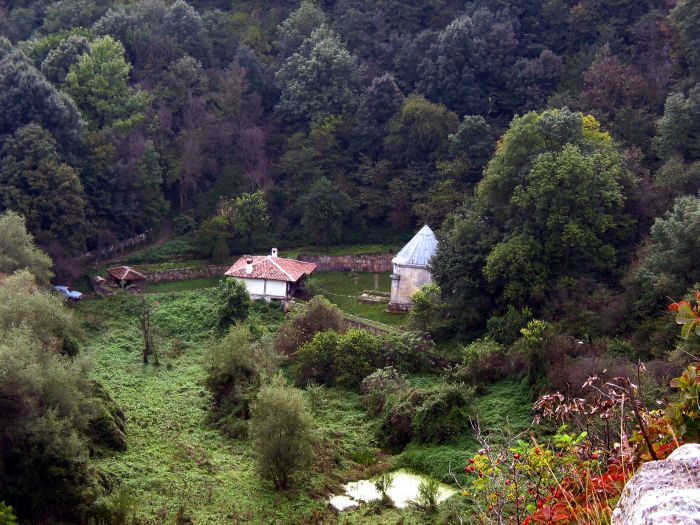
Distant view towards the complex

== See also ==
- Razgrad Incident
- Ibrahim Pasha mosque
- Banya Bashi Mosque clashes
