= Konevo, Russia =

Konevo (Russian: Конево) or Konyovo (Конёво) is the name of several rural localities in Russia.

== Modern localities ==
- Konevo, Altai Krai, a selo in Podoynikovsky Selsoviet of Pankrushikhinsky District in Altai Krai; 53°52′N 80°34′E
- Konyovo, Arkhangelsk Oblast, a selo in Konevsky Selsoviet of Plesetsky District in Arkhangelsk Oblast
- Konevo, Kaliningrad Oblast, a settlement in Krasnoyarsky Rural Okrug of Ozyorsky District in Kaliningrad Oblast
- Konevo, Kemerovo Oblast, a selo in Konevskaya Rural Territory of Belovsky District in Kemerovo Oblast; 54°32′N 86°15′E
- Konevo (selo), Kostroma Oblast, a selo in Konevskoye Settlement of Sharyinsky District in Kostroma Oblast
- Konevo (village), Kostroma Oblast, a village in Konevskoye Settlement of Sharyinsky District in Kostroma Oblast
- Konevo, Kursk Oblast, a khutor in Nizhnemedveditsky Selsoviet of Kursky District in Kursk Oblast
- Konevo, Balakhninsky District, Nizhny Novgorod Oblast, a village in Konevsky Selsoviet of Balakhninsky District in Nizhny Novgorod Oblast
- Konevo, Kovriginsky Selsoviet, Gorodetsky District, Nizhny Novgorod Oblast, a village in Kovriginsky Selsoviet of Gorodetsky District in Nizhny Novgorod Oblast
- Konevo, Smirkinsky Selsoviet, Gorodetsky District, Nizhny Novgorod Oblast, a village in Smirkinsky Selsoviet of Gorodetsky District in Nizhny Novgorod Oblast
- Konevo, Krasnozyorsky District, Novosibirsk Oblast, a selo in Krasnozyorsky District of Novosibirsk Oblast
- Konevo, Toguchinsky District, Novosibirsk Oblast, a village in Toguchinsky District of Novosibirsk Oblast
- Konevo, Perm Krai, a village in Sivinsky District of Perm Krai
- Konevo, Pskov Oblast, a village in Ostrovsky District of Pskov Oblast
- Konevo, Artinsky District, Sverdlovsk Oblast, a village in Artinsky District of Sverdlovsk Oblast
- Konevo, Nevyansky District, Sverdlovsk Oblast, a selo in Nevyansky District of Sverdlovsk Oblast
- Konevo, Tver Oblast, a village in Botovskoye Rural Settlement of Ostashkovsky District in Tver Oblast
- Konevo, Tyumen Oblast, a selo in Konevsky Rural Okrug of Abatsky District in Tyumen Oblast
- Konevo, Kharovsky District, Vologda Oblast, a village in Kubinsky Selsoviet of Kharovsky District in Vologda Oblast
- Konevo, Vashkinsky District, Vologda Oblast, a village in Roksomsky Selsoviet of Vashkinsky District in Vologda Oblast

== Alternative names ==
- Konevo, alternative name of Konevy, a village in Stulovsky Rural Okrug of Slobodskoy District in Kirov Oblast; 58°41′N 50°8′E
