= Alians =

Sufi mystic order in Shia Islam

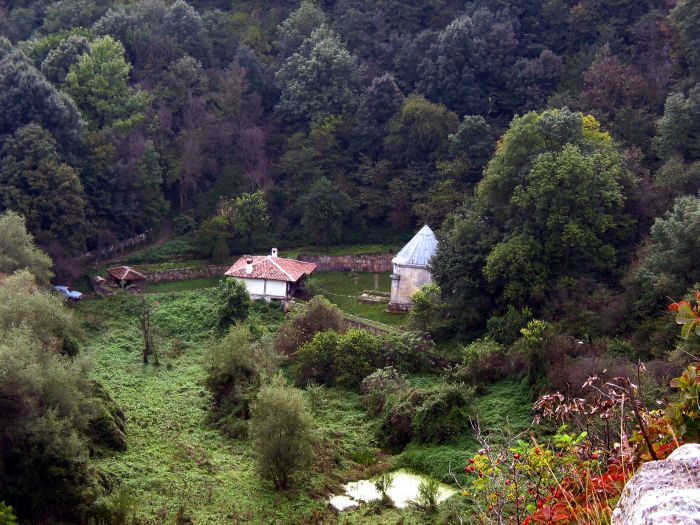
Demir Baba teke, Alian sacred place

The Alian Order (in Bulgarian: алиани, in Turkish: Alevi) is a Shia Muslim community based in Bulgaria. The term “Alian” derives from the veneration of Ali ibn Abi Talib, cousin and son-in-law of Prophet Muhammad, whom the community considers an emanation of God. The community goes by several names in Bulgaria, including Aliani (Алиани), Alevii (Алевии), Kazalbashi (or Kızılbaşı, meaning “red heads” in Turkish), and Bektashi.

The Alian community's historical connection to the Safavid dynasty represents an important element of their identity and historical development. The Qizilbash tribes who sided with Ismail I (r. 1501-1524) are considered among the ancestors of the Alians. Theologically, the Alian community adheres to a form of Shi'a Islam with distinctive principles that differentiate them from Sunnism and Twelver Shi'ism. They are also Sufi and believe that the union that a person can achieve with God is entirely personal and based on individual experience.

== Origin theories ==
Their exact origin is not certain, since few relevant historical records have been preserved, but according to the prevailing theory they fled to Bulgaria from Central Anatolia after the 1512 victory by the Ottoman Sultan Selim I, a Sunni, over the first, part-Turcoman Safavid shah of the Persians, Ismail I.

Alians appear to be descendants of a Sufi-dervish-like group of priests but they themselves believe about 10% are the descendants of the earliest Christians of Asia Minor who fled the Sunni invasion of Anatolia. Ali for them is not one single historical person but the ineffable name kept by God's Ministers (Avlioh).

It has also been suggested that they perhaps first came to the Balkans during the 15th century, in order to keep up the morale of Ottoman soldiers and to help integrate the newly conquered peoples into the empire.

== Observances and beliefs ==
The Alians have similar beliefs and practices to the Alevis and, along with Alevis are surviving examples of pre-Sunni Islam because the Alians are believed to be descendants of a member of the Banu Eli tribe who was called Abbas ibn Ali and Umm ul-Banin. Their 12 imams refer to 12 ministerial roles during the Alian religious ceremony, and they are hence different from those of Twelver Shiism. They believe the Quran was compiled by Salman al-Farsi, whom they hold in high esteem. Their tafsir of the Quran is based on harmony between the 4 books (Quran, the Old Testament, the New Testament, and Psalter).

They are a closed society and hide their rituals. Circumcision, is done when the boy is one week old. At the age of 13 years, his pubic hair may be trimmed in a special ceremony where only male Elders are present. They are monogamous and should only marry other Alians. Marriages may be arranged years in advance by the families, but the couple is only married together as young men and women because Alians abhor child marriage. Alians believe in personal communication with God through a near-trance state during Zikr. They use the Persian calendar, an Old Rite-style breviary, and use candles and wine during their Dzhem on Thursday nights to achieve the Haqq–Muhammad–Ali communion. They celebrate Gaxand in winter and Nowruz in spring, and celebrate Sufi saints, using icons and crosses alongside tasbih. They historically placed a great role among themselves for converting Christians in Bulgaria.

A tradition is performed among Alians after the 3rd week of December until the first week of January, during which Gaxan, his bride Fadike, and a character normally known as the Arab, will visit homes to perform a play and collect gifts. They distribute these to others in the community, especially Zeyi, i.e. young women who can not afford dowries; they also distribute nuts, sweets, chocolate and dried fruits to children.

Balkan Christians visit Alian shrines. Alians did not visit madrassahs in the Ottoman Empire because Sunni Islam was taught there. Consequently, they educated their children themselves. They are at risk of gradual assimilation into Orthodox Christianity or secularism. By the Second World War and the following Communism in Bulgaria, many Alians fled to the European part of Turkey.

Demir Baba teke is a sacred place to Alians and other Islamic sects because Demir Baba, a famous dervish who lived during the 16th century, is buried there. The tekke of Otman Baba, located in the Haskovo-region village of Teketo, is another Alian holy site.

The historical emergence of the Shī'ah Imāmī Alian Ṭarīqah and other related Muslim sects

Alians and Shia Islam

== Location ==
In Bulgaria, Alians inhabit predominantly the villages of Yablanovo and Malko Selo in Sliven Province; Sevar, Ostrovo, Madrevo, Sveshtari, Bisertsi, and Lavino in Razgrad Province; Preslavci, Chernik, and Bradvari in Silistra Province; and Mogilets and Bayachevo in Targovishte Province.

== Notes ==
- Житието на Демир Баба и създаването на ръкописи от мюсюлманите от хетеродоксните течения на исляма в Североизточна България (in Bulgarian).: Demir Baba's life and the creation of manuscripts by heterodox Muslims in northeastern Bulgaria
- "Демир баба теке е светиня" (in Bulgarian). Archived from the original on 2020-06-29.: Demir baba teke is a holy place
- "Националният институт за паметници на културата иска да спре реставрацията на Демир баба теке" (in Bulgarian). Archived from the original on 2007-09-28.: The National institute of cultural monuments want to halt the restoration of Demir baba teke
- Георгиева, И. (1997). Българските алиани. Сборник етнографски материали (in Bulgarian). Sofia. Bulgarian Alians. A collection of ethnographic materials.
- Bosakov, Vesselin (1999). "Religious and sociocultural dimensions of the Kazalbashi community in Bulgaria". Facta Universitatis. 2 (6). University of Niš: 277–283.
