= Loznitsa =

Loznitsa Лозница
- Location of Loznitsa
- Coordinates: 43°22′N 26°36′E
- Country: Bulgaria
- Provinces (Oblast): Razgrad

Government
  - Mayor: Ayhan Hashimov
- Elevation: 214 m (702 ft)

Population (December 2009)
  - Total: 2,409
- Time zone: UTC+2 (EET)
  - Summer (DST): UTC+3 (EEST)
- Postal Code: 7290
- Area code: 08362

Loznitsa (Bulgarian: Лозница, pronounced [ˈɫɔznit͡sɐ]; also transliterated Loznica or Loznitza; Turkish: Kubadın) is a small town in northeastern Bulgaria, part of Razgrad Province, located in the geographic region of Ludogorie. It is the administrative centre of the homonymous Loznitsa Municipality, which lies in the southernmost part of the Province. As of December 2009, the town had a population of 2,409.

In Antiquity, Thracians Romans and Byzantines inhabited the area; there are also traces of a Bulgarian settlement dating to the 7th-11th century, the time of the First Bulgarian Empire. The old Ottoman Turkish name of Loznitsa was Kubadın and it was first mentioned in a register in 1573. Around the time of the Liberation of Bulgaria, present Loznitsa was a village of 66 households according to Russian data. In the early 20th century, Bulgarians from the Balkan Mountains settled in the village. A school was built in 1908, and the local community centre (chitalishte) Probuda was founded in 1912.

In 1934, the old Turkish name was changed to the Bulgarian Loznitsa, honouring the region's viticultural traditions ("loza" means "vine" in Bulgarian). On 4 September 1974, the village was proclaimed a town. Loznitsa has a mixed population of Bulgarians, Turks, and Romani. The town is twinned with the Küçükçekmece suburb of Istanbul, Turkey.

== Municipality ==
Loznitsa municipality includes the following 16 places:

- Beli Lom
- Chudomir
- Gorotsvet
- Gradina
- Kamenar
- Kroyach
- Lovsko
- Loznitsa
- Manastirsko
- Manastirtsi
- Seydol
- Sinya Voda
- Studenets
- Trabach
- Trapishte
- Veselina
