= Ezerche =

- Location of Ezerche
- Coordinates: 43°33′N 26°19′E
- Country: Bulgaria
- Provinces (Oblast): Razgrad

Government
  - Mayor: Хюсеин Реханов Хюсеинов
- Elevation: 294 m (965 ft)

Population (2021)
  - Total: 1,510
- Time zone: UTC+2 (EET)
  - Summer (DST): UTC+3 (EEST)
- Postal Code: 7274
- Area code: 084

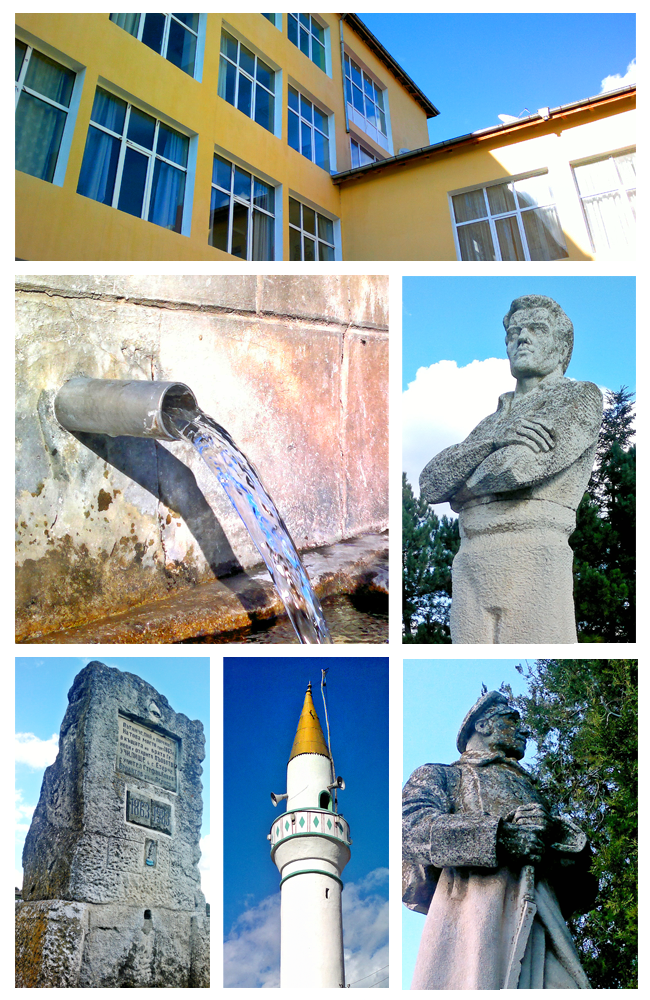
Montage of famous landmarks in the area

Ezerche (Bulgarian: Езерче) is a village in northeastern Bulgaria, part of Tsar Kaloyan Municipality, Razgrad Province. It has a population of about 2,000. The village is around 261 km (162 mi) from the capital of Sofia.

It is the birthplace of the artist Radi Nedelchev and the 1960 Olympic champion Dimitar Dobrev and Mehmed Hyusmenov Kodakov world championship medalist was also born there
