= Tsar Kaloyan =

Tsar Kaloyan may refer to:

- Kaloyan of Bulgaria - emperor (tsar) of Bulgaria from 1197 to 1207
- Tsar Kaloyan, Razgrad Province - a town and municipality of the Razgrad Province in Bulgaria
- Tsar Kaloyan, Plovdiv Province - a village in the Kuklen municipality of the Plovdiv Province, Bulgaria
