= Vazovo =

Vazovo Вазово
- Location of Vazovo
- Coordinates: 43°46′N 26°49′E
- Country: Bulgaria
- Province (Oblast): Razgrad

Government
  - Mayor: Fedail Ibryam
- Elevation: 204 m (669 ft)

Population (2015)
  - Total: 881
- Time zone: UTC+2 (EET)
  - Summer (DST): UTC+3 (EEST)
- Postal Code: 7422
- Area code: 083393

Vazovo (Bulgarian: Вазово, formerly Ески Балабанлар, Turkish: Eski Balabanlar) is a village in northeastern Bulgaria, part of the Isperih Municipality of Razgrad Province, located in the central part of the Ludogorie region. Vazovo has an area of 20.843 square kilometres (8.048 sq mi). The closest villages to Vazovo are Sveshtari to the south and Raynino to the north. In the period 1913-1916 and again between 1919 and 1940, when Southern Dobrudzha was under Romanian control, the Bulgarian-Romanian border passed just north of the village. In 1934 the village was renamed Vazovo, after the Bulgarian writer Ivan Vazov. Vazovo “Eski Balabanlar” has been a Turkish settlement since early 14th century, most who migrated to Turkey in between 1900 and 1989.
