= Tsar Kaloyan Municipality =

Tsar Kaloyan Municipality Община Цар Калоян
- Municipality
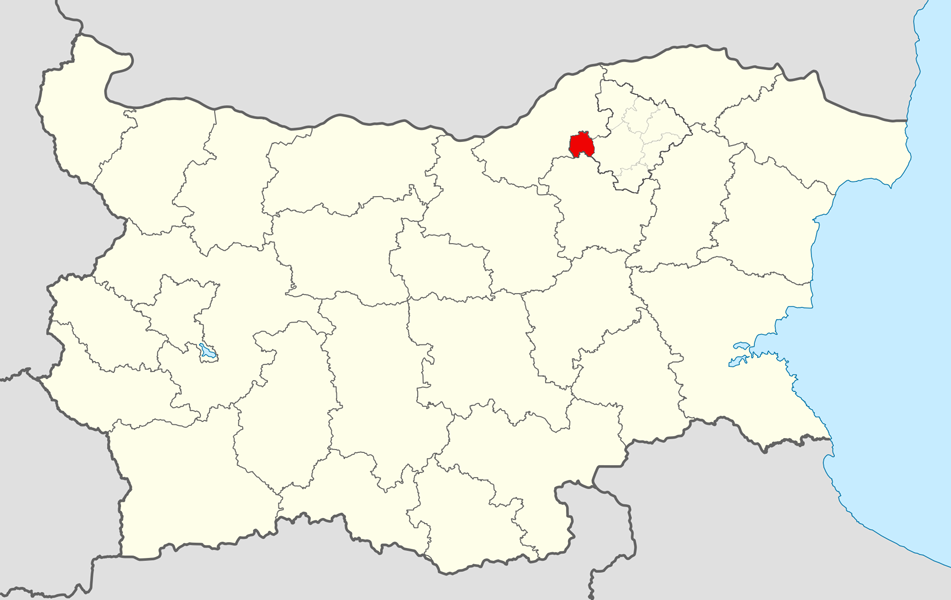
- Tsar Kaloyan Municipality within Bulgaria and Razgrad Province.
- Coordinates: 43°35′N 26°14′E
- Country: Bulgaria
- Province (Oblast): Razgrad
- Admin. centre (Obshtinski tsentar): Tsar Kaloyan

Area
  - Total: 186.42 km^{2} (71.98 sq mi)

Population (December 2009)
  - Total: 6,314
  - Density: 33.87/km^{2} (87.72/sq mi)
- Time zone: UTC+2 (EET)
  - Summer (DST): UTC+3 (EEST)

Tsar Kaloyan Municipality (Bulgarian: Община Цар Калоян, former name Hlebarovo Municipality) is a small municipality (obshtina) in Razgrad Province, Northeastern Bulgaria, located in the Danubian Plain about 27 km southeast of Danube river. It is named after its administrative centre - the town of Tsar Kaloyan.

The municipality embraces a territory of 186.42 km^{2} (71.98 sq mi) with a population of 6,314 inhabitants, as of December 2009.

The main road E70 crosses the area, connecting the province centre of Razgrad with the city of Ruse and respectively the Danube Bridge with the eastern operating part of Hemus motorway.

== Settlements ==
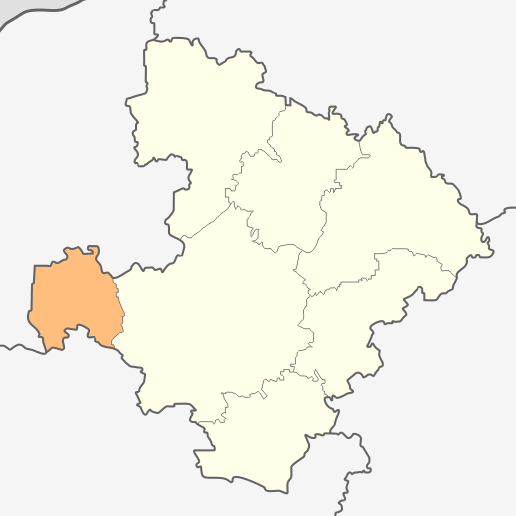
Tsar Kaloyan Municipality within Razgrad Province

Tsar Kaloyan Municipality includes the following 3 places (towns are shown in bold):

Town/Village	Cyrillic	Population (December 2009)
**Tsar Kaloyan**	**Цар Калоян**	3,856
Ezerche	Езерче	1,975
Kostandenets	Костанденец	483
Total		6,314

== Demography ==
The following table shows the change of the population during the last four decades.

Tsar Kaloyan Municipality
**Year**	1975	1985	1992	**2001**	2005	2007	2009	**2011**
**Population**	489	9,547	18,292	15,965	64,679	67,676	103,004	103,816
Sources: Census 2001, Census 2011, „pop-stat.mashke.org“,

=== Religion ===
According to the latest Bulgarian census of 2011, the religious composition, among those who answered the optional question on religious identification, was the following:

Religious composition of Tsar Kaloyan Municipality
Orthodox Christianity	24.1%
Catholicism	0.1%
Protestantism	0.1%
Islam	60.7%
No religion	1.9%
Prefer not to answer, others and indefinable	13.1%

== See also ==
- Provinces of Bulgaria
- Municipalities of Bulgaria
- List of cities and towns in Bulgaria
