= Zavet Municipality =

Zavet Municipality Община Завет
- Municipality
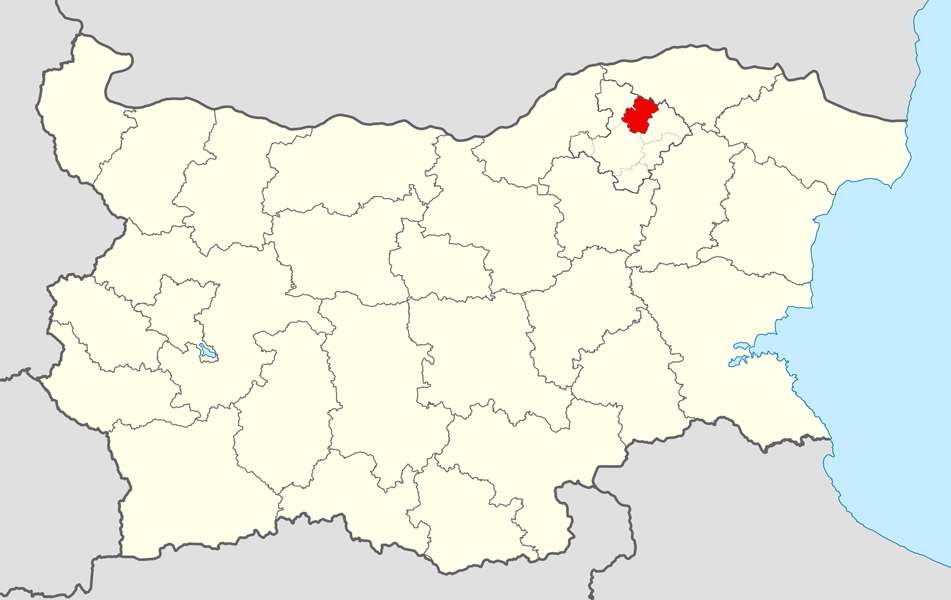
- Zavet Municipality within Bulgaria and Razgrad Province.
- Coordinates: 43°46′N 26°38′E
- Country: Bulgaria
- Province (Oblast): Razgrad
- Admin. centre (Obshtinski tsentar): Zavet

Area
  - Total: 273.88 km^{2} (105.75 sq mi)

Population (December 2009)
  - Total: 11,338
  - Density: 41.398/km^{2} (107.22/sq mi)
- Time zone: UTC+2 (EET)
  - Summer (DST): UTC+3 (EEST)

Zavet Municipality (Bulgarian: Община Завет) is a municipality (obshtina) in Razgrad Province, Northeastern Bulgaria, located in the Ludogorie geographical region part of the Danubian Plain. It is named after its administrative centre - the town of Zavet.

The municipality embraces a territory of 273.88 km^{2} (105.75 sq mi) with a population of 11,338 inhabitants, as of December 2009.

== Settlements ==
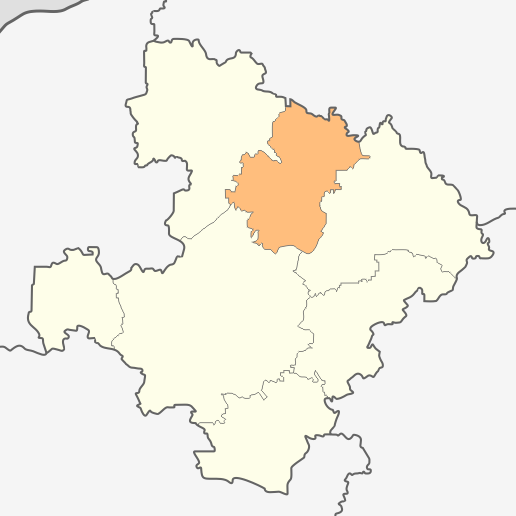
Zavet Municipality within Razgrad Province

Zavet Municipality includes the following 7 places (towns are shown in bold):

Town/Village	Cyrillic	Population (December 2009)
**Zavet**	**Завет**	3,371
Brestovene	Брестовене	2,874
Ivan Shishmanovo	Иван Шишманово	445
Ostrovo	Острово	2,229
Prelez	Прелез	760
Sushevo	Сушево	669
Veselets	Веселец	990
Total		11,338

== Demography ==
The following table shows the change of the population during the last four decades.

Zavet Municipality
**Year**	1975	1985	1992	**2001**	2005	2007	2009	**2011**
**Population**	12,672	11,484	13,637	12,333	11,943	11,665	11,338	...
Sources: Census 2001, Census 2011, „pop-stat.mashke.org“,

=== Religion ===
According to the latest Bulgarian census of 2011, the religious composition, among those who answered the optional question on religious identification, was the following:

Religious composition of Zavet Municipality
Orthodox Christianity	16.0%
Catholicism	0.2%
Protestantism	0.3%
Islam	67.9%
No religion	1.4%
Prefer not to answer, others and indefinable	14.2%

== See also ==
- Provinces of Bulgaria
- Municipalities of Bulgaria
- List of cities and towns in Bulgaria
