= Sredoseltsi =

Village in northeastern Bulgaria

Coordinates: 43°41′44″N 26°54′54″E

Sredoseltsi (Bulgarian: Средоселци; Turkish: Ortamahalle) is a village in northeastern Bulgaria, part of Isperih Municipality and situated in the central part of the Ludogorie region.

365 inhabitants reside in Sredoseltsi.

Sredoseltsi has an area of 6,778 km^{2}. Its neighbors include Kapinovtsi to the south, and Pechenitsa to the north-east.
