= Tsar Kaloyan, Razgrad Province =

Town in Razgrad oblast, Bulgaria

Coordinates: 43°37′N 26°15′E

Tsar Kaloyan (Bulgarian: Цар Калоян [ˈt͡sar kɐɫoˈjan]) is a town in northeastern Bulgaria, situated in Razgrad Province near the town of Razgrad. It is the administrative centre of the homonymous Tsar Kaloyan Municipality. As of December 2009, the town had a population of 3,856.

The village was named Torlak until 1934 when it was reverted to Tsar Kaloyan. In 1951 it was renamed Hlebarovo. In 1991 the name was reverted to Tsar Kaloyan.
