= Samuil Municipality =

Samuil Municipality Община Самуил
- Municipality
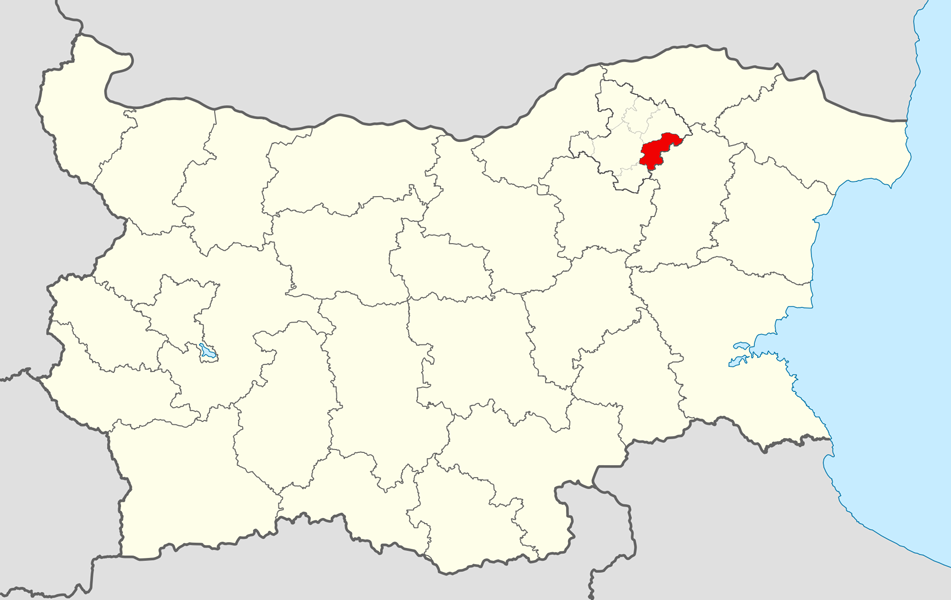
- Samuil Municipality within Bulgaria and Razgrad Province.
- Coordinates: 43°32′N 26°44′E
- Country: Bulgaria
- Province (Oblast): Razgrad
- Admin. centre (Obshtinski tsentar): Samuil

Area
  - Total: 250.29 km^{2} (96.64 sq mi)

Population (December 2009)
  - Total: 7,522
  - Density: 30.05/km^{2} (77.84/sq mi)
- Time zone: UTC+2 (EET)
  - Summer (DST): UTC+3 (EEST)

Samuil Municipality (Bulgarian: Община Самуил) is a municipality (obshtina) in Razgrad Province, Northeastern Bulgaria, located in the Ludogorie geographical region part of the Danubian Plain. It is named after its administrative centre - the village of Samuil.

The municipality embraces a territory of 250 km^{2} (97 sq mi) with a population of 7,522 inhabitants, as of December 2009.

== Settlements ==
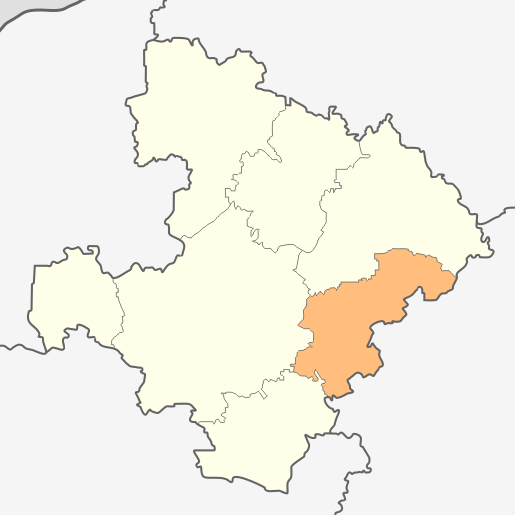
Samuil Municipality within Razgrad Province

Samuil Municipality includes the following 14 places all of them villages:

| Town/Village | Cyrillic | Population (December 2009) |
|---|---|---|
| Samuil | Самуил | 1,543 |
| Bogdantsi | Богданци | 534 |
| Bogomiltsi | Богомилци | 265 |
| Golyama Voda | Голяма вода | 328 |
| Golyam Izvor | Голям Извор | 425 |
| Harsovo | Хърсово | 584 |
| Huma | Хума | 245 |
| Kara Mihal | Кара Михал | 79 |
| Krivitsa | Кривица | 225 |
| Nozharovo | Ножарово | 571 |
| Pchelina | Пчелина | 279 |
| Vladimirovtsi | Владимировци | 1,170 |
| Zdravets | Здравец | 396 |
| Zhelyazkovets | Желязковец | 878 |
| Total | | 7,522 |

== Demography ==
The following table shows the change of the population during the last four decades.

Samuil Municipality
| Year | 1975 | 1985 | 1992 | 2001 | 2005 | 2007 | 2009 | 2011 |
| Population | 14,865 | 12,472 | 9,585 | 8,164 | 7,867 | 7,740 | 7,522 | ... |
Sources: Census 2001, Census 2011, „pop-stat.mashke.org“,

=== Religion ===
According to the latest Bulgarian census of 2011, the religious composition, among those who answered the optional question on religious identification, was the following:

Religious composition of Samuil Municipality
| Orthodox Christianity | 11.4% |
| Catholicism | 0.3% |
| Protestantism | 0.2% |
| Islam | 84.3% |
| No religion | 1.4% |
| Prefer not to answer, others and indefinable | 2.4% |

== See also ==
- Provinces of Bulgaria
- Municipalities of Bulgaria
- List of cities and towns in Bulgaria
