= Isperih Municipality =

Isperih Municipality Община Исперих
- Municipality
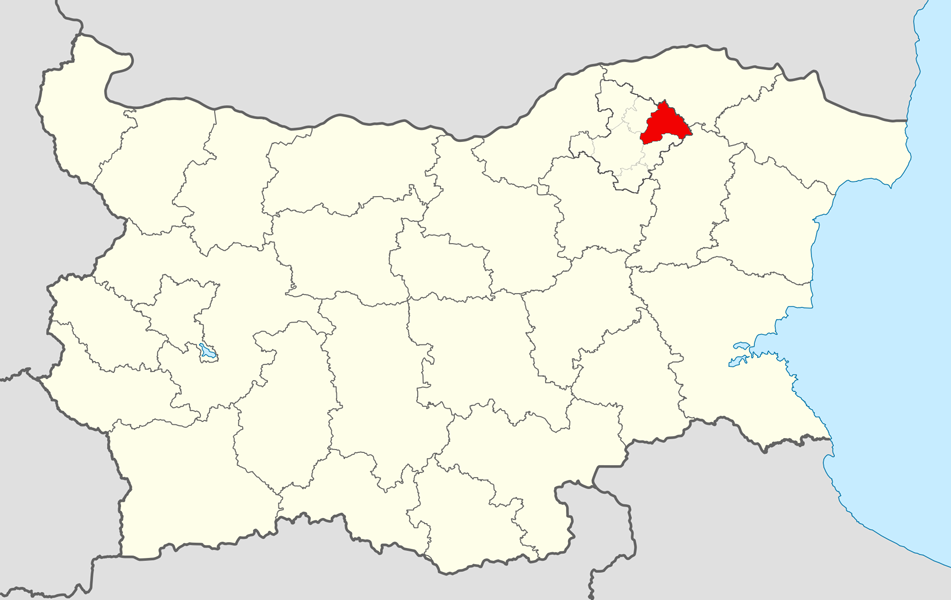
- Isperih Municipality within Bulgaria and Razgrad Province.
- Coordinates: 43°42′N 26°49′E
- Country: Bulgaria
- Province (Oblast): Razgrad
- Admin. centre (Obshtinski tsentar): Isperih

Area
  - Total: 402.24 km^{2} (155.31 sq mi)

Population (December 2024)
  - Total: 18,701
  - Density: 46.492/km^{2} (120.41/sq mi)
- Time zone: UTC+2 (EET)
  - Summer (DST): UTC+3 (EEST)

Isperih Municipality (Bulgarian: Община Исперих) is a municipality (obshtina) in Razgrad Province, Northeastern Bulgaria, located in the Ludogorie geographical region part of the Danubian Plain. It is named after its administrative centre - the town of Isperih.

The municipality has a territory of 402 km^{2} (155 sq mi). As of December 2024, it had a population of 18,701.

The area is best known with the 3rd century BC Thracian Tomb of Sveshtari near the village of the same name, and the state-owned Voden hunting reserve, renowned for one of the strongest populations of red deer in the world.

== Settlements ==
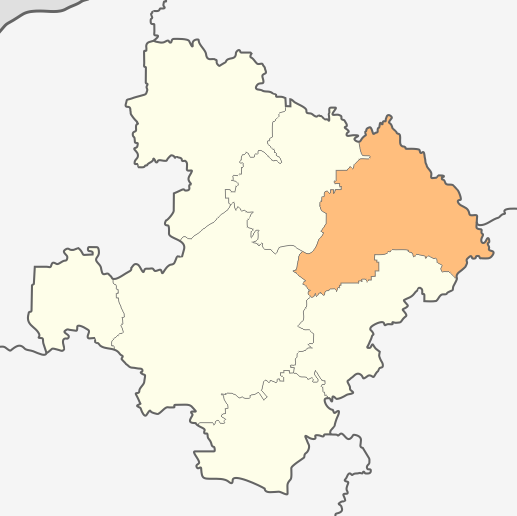
Isperih Municipality within Razgrad Province

Isperih Municipality includes the following 24 places (towns are shown in bold):

Town/Village	Cyrillic	Population (December 2009)
**Isperih**	**Исперих**	9,017
Belintsi	Белинци	480
Bardokva	Бърдоква	289
Delchevo	Делчево	450
Dragomazh	Драгомъж	355
Duhovets	Духовец	542
Golyam Porovets	Голям Поровец	628
Kitanchevo	Китанчево	1,549
Konevo	Конево	131
Kapinovtsi	Къпиновци	211
Ludogortsi	Лудогорци	849
Lavino	Лъвино	1,066
Malko Yonkovo	Малко Йонково	380
Malak Porovets	Малък Поровец	388
Pechenitsa	Печеница	299
Podayva	Подайва	1,566
Raynino	Райнино	550
Sveshtari	Свещари	632
Sredoseltsi	Средоселци	321
Staro Selishte	Старо селище	367
Todorovo	Тодорово	757
Vazovo	Вазово	986
Yakim Gruevo	Яким Груево	277
Yonkovo	Йонково	826
Total		22,916

== Demography ==
The following table shows the change of the population during the last four decades.

Isperih Municipality
Year	1975	1985	1992	2001	2005	2007	2009	2011
Population	35,838	34,902	27,936	25,287	24,141	23,601	22,916	...
Sources: Census 2001, Census 2011, „pop-stat.mashke.org“,

=== Religion ===
According to the latest Bulgarian census of 2011, the religious composition, among those who answered the optional question on religious identification, was the following:

Religious composition of Isperih Municipality
Orthodox Christianity	26.7%
Catholicism	0.2%
Protestantism	0.1%
Islam	67.0%
No religion	1.1%
Prefer not to answer, others and indefinable	4.9%

== See also ==
- Provinces of Bulgaria
- Municipalities of Bulgaria
- List of cities and towns in Bulgaria
