= Razgrad clock tower =

Clock tower in Bulgaria

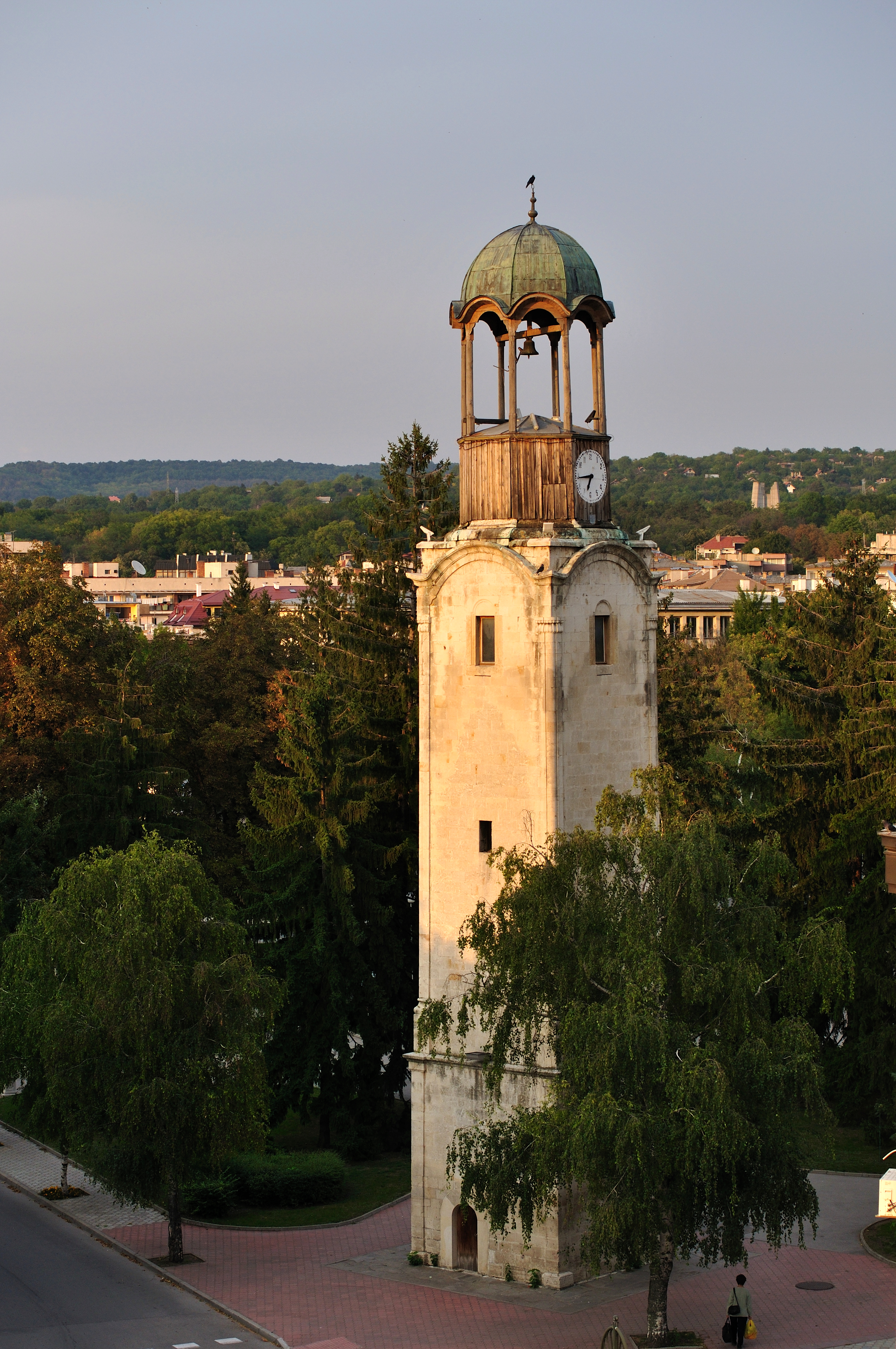
- Interactive map of the Razgrad clock tower area

General information
- Architectural style: Ottoman architecture
- Location: Razgrad, Bulgaria
- Coordinates: 43°31′36.02″N 26°31′20.87″E

Height
- Height: 24.95 metres (81.9 ft)

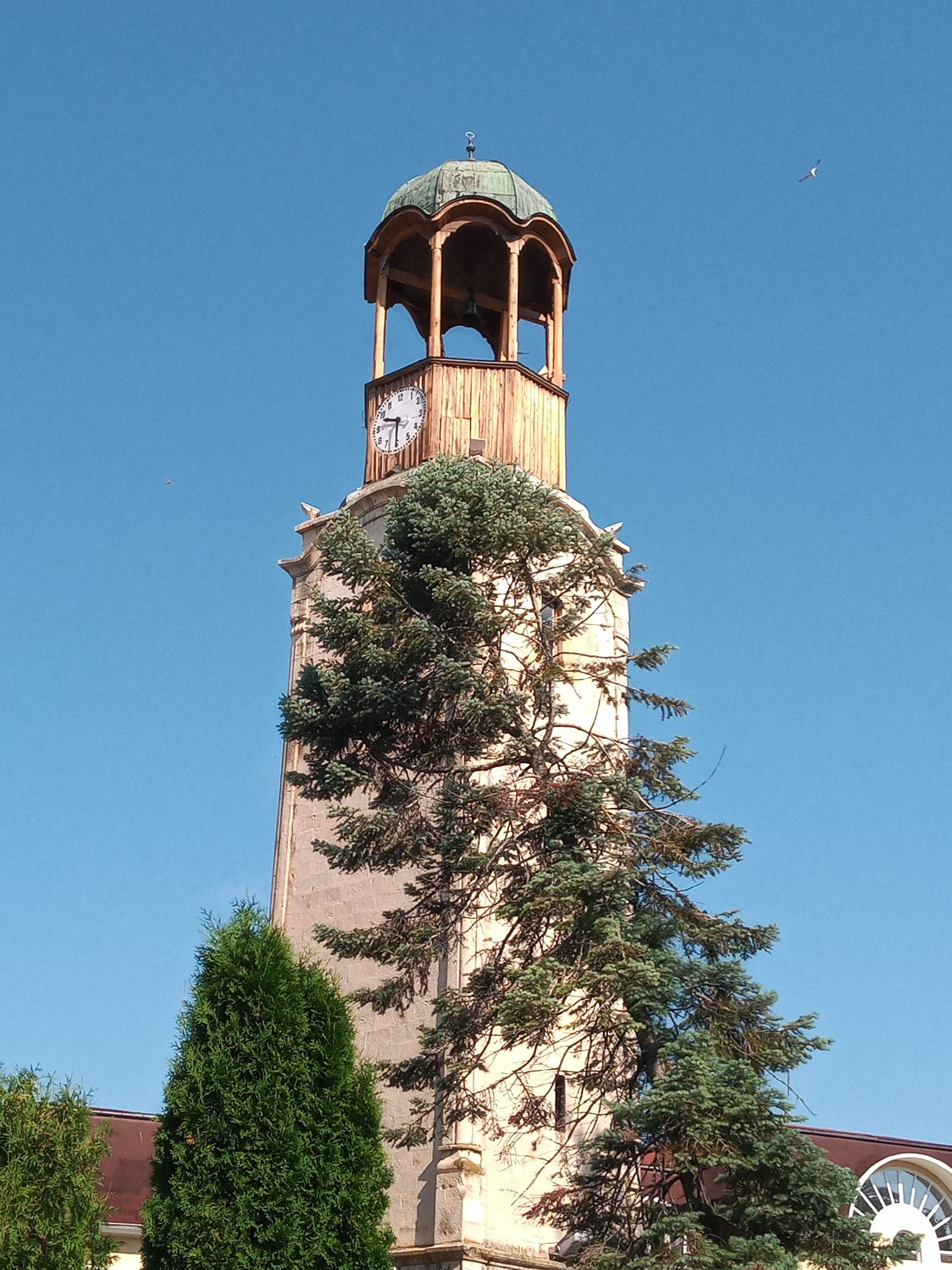
Closer view of Razgrad clock tower

The clock tower in the city of Razgrad, northeastern Bulgaria, is about 25 metres (82 ft) high and dates to the Ottoman era.

It is among the vast number of clock towers spreading in Bulgaria after the rise of the first clock towers in the Western Balkans during the second half of the 16th century, the earliest evidence of which was the clock tower in Plovdiv in 1611. The clock towers in Bulgaria performed multiple tasks as they were used not only for timekeeping, but for signaling danger and fire emergency, and as watch towers for military purposes and defense. In the 18th, and especially the 19th, centuries, these towers served mainly craftsmen and traders in their efforts to keep work hours in check to prevent competition and work exploitation.

== Dating of the clock tower ==
In the stead of the present-day clock tower in Razgrad once there was a different one ending with a steeple in a Gothic style (Yavashov 1930:100), evidence of whose existence was recorded by the German explorer in the service of Denmark Carsten Niebuhr, who visited the town on 22 June 1767. Niebuhr's statement about the clock tower in Razgrad is quite impressive, given the fact that on his journey through ‘’Egypt, Arabia, India, and all over Turkey from Basra to the Balkans” he came upon a clock tower only in Razgrad.

For lack of more accurate information, the issue of the precise dating of the tower remains open. However, it can be inferred that the structure was built between 1651 and 1767, or, in other words, between the years marking the visits of Evliya Çelebi and Carsten Niebuhr to the town. That, in turn, means that the tower must have been built either in the second half of the 17th century, that is, after the visit of Evliya Çelebi, whose travelogue did not include a mention of the tower, or in the first half of the 18th century, that is, before the visit of C. Niebuhr.

In 1864 the governor (vali) of Ruse and Ottoman reformer Midhat Pasha tore down the old tower and built in its place the present-day one. The designer and constructor of the rebuilt tower was the famous mason Todor Tonchev, born in the tiny mountain hamlet of Durcha near Tryavna. After the Liberation of Bulgaria from Ottoman rule (1878), Todor Tonchev moved to the village of Kalfa Dere (now Balkanski), where he built a church honoring St. Dimitar. The mason was buried in the local cemetery. According to a written source cited by L. Mikov in his article “The Clock Tower” included in the book "The Mosque of Ibrahim Pasha and ‘Ibrahim Pasha’ Mosque in Razgrad”, the stone blocks used for the construction of the tower were taken from the nearby village of Arnaut Kui (“Arnautkyoy’’, now Poroishte) as were the builders.

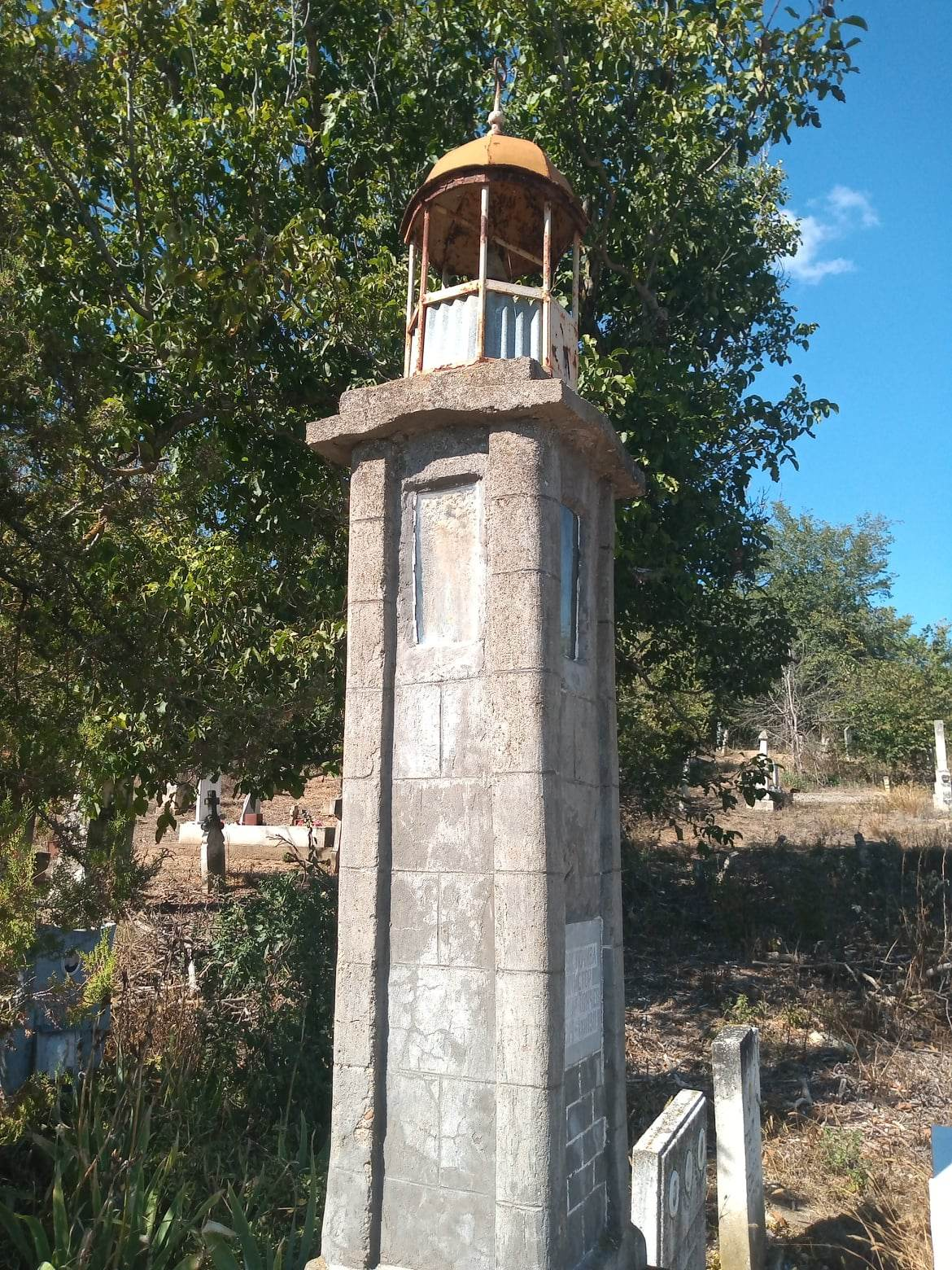
Master Todor Tonchev's gravestone

== Present state ==
The present-day clock tower is 24.95 metres (81.9 ft) high and consists of three main parts, two of which are made of stone; the third part is wooden and comprises the belfry. The stone parts represent a base and a body. They are constructed of smooth layers of limestone blocks bound together with a mixture of lime, sand, and water. The width of the masonry is 1.05 metres (3 ft 5 in). The body is 12.2 metres (40 ft) tall. On every side, and at the same level in its upper part, there are windows at 1.15 metres (3 ft 9 in) high and 0.65 metres (2 ft 2 in) wide. Over every window there is a semi-circular arch containing a lunette. Nowadays, the stone relief forming a crescent in the middle of the lunette does not exist, likely removed after restorations done to the tower in 1998. In addition to the windows, the inside of the building is also lit and aired through embrasures typical of most towers and minarets alike.

The wooden part, known as "frame-built", represents a belfry at 7.55 metres (24.8 ft) high. It incorporates a boarded-up octagonal base and a dome cover supported by columns. The 1,65 m high dome is lined with sheet iron and consists of eight elements. The horizontal ceiling inside it holds the bell. The northern and southern sides of the belfry each have a clock face mounted on them. The clock mechanism is located at the base of the tower next to a wooden staircase leading to the clock face and the bell. Once the dome of the belfry ended with an ornament (alem) representing the image of a crescent. Today this alem is replaced with a metal ring, probably in result of the 1998 renovation of the tower. Hence, the inference that the religious sign on the dome shaped in a half moon was preserved until the end of the 20th century since the time of its installation in 1864, when the tower was rebuilt on the initiative of Midhat Pasha and by Master Todor Tonchev.

By virtue of a state protocol as of 2 April 1984, the clock tower obtained the status of a local cultural heritage landmark. In 1998, the tower was renovated through the efforts of the Municipality of Razgrad and Armagh District Council, Northern Ireland. To mark the event, a marble plaque bearing an inscription in Bulgarian and English, was made and set over the entrance of the tower. The first section of the inscription reads: “The clock tower was constructed in 1864 by Todor Tontchev – stone mason.” Beneath is another text: “Restorated in 1998 by Municipality of Razgrad and Armagh District Council, Northern Ireland.” The first part of the inscription specifically marks the role of Master Todor Tonchev but makes no mention of the initiator of the renovation. From the old clock tower, yet to be dated, has been kept the original bell. The inscription in Hungarian on the bell indicates the year and place of its production – 1731, the town of Oravica in Banat. Supposedly, the bell was brought from Hungary during one of the Austro-Turkish wars.

According to Bulgarian historian Ananie Yavashov, in the French edition of the travelogues of Irish writer and clergyman Robert Walsh was included additional information about the bell in question. In that respect he wrote that “on the bell, still standing in the belfry, is an engraved inscription reading: Mich. Thomas, Khenaver. In orovizae. 1731 Cross, and a Christ crucifixion in relief” (Yavashov 1930:99). “It could be concluded”, the author continues, “from the Latin inscription that the bell was forcibly appropriated from an orthodox or catholic church as a trophy – military booty taken by the Turks on their campaigns into one-time Austria-Hungary” (Yavashov 1930:99-100).

The phrase “in orovizae” probably gives indication of the place where the bell was cast. Yavashov goes on to explain that the town of Oravicza is in Banat...between Orșova and Temišvar – an area rich in coal, iron, copper, and other ores. There must have been a bell foundry as well; hence, the bell of the clock tower was produced in these whereabouts, but it is unclear from which exactly church, town or village it came from” (Yavashov 1930:100 footnote). In Ottoman times, the clock tower was incorporated in a row of small workshops. A few years after the Liberation (1878) those workshops were destroyed and replaced by wooden ones. For many years, the space around the tower served as a marketplace next to another one around the nearby mosque of Ibrahim Pasha. As of today, the clock tower is a freestanding structure.

== Impact on the Ottoman urban skyline ==
In his article about the clock tower in Razgrad, L. Mikov quotes the observation of M. Harbova expressing the idea that in the 15th – 19th c. in settlements of prevailing Turkish population “the mosque, the konak (Ottoman town hall), and the covered bazaar established themselves as a dominant architectural feature of the town square whereas Bulgarian meeting spaces lacked in such highlights” (Harbova 1984:350-351). However, in the opinion of L. Mikov, the advent of the clock tower, especially in the 18th and 19th c., introduced a significant change in the outline of the Balkan urban agora. The innovative element introduced by the Revival was the concept of urban zoning encompassing functionally identified areas serving as hubs of the various parts of the settlement. Around the main square were located artisans’ workshops and merchants’ stores, thus creating a central zone of commercial and manufacturing character. The outline of these major urban hubs did not have to be shaped by the presence of religious buildings as was typical of Muslim cityscapes, but by craft-and-trade edifices, which provided sources of wealth and a new manner of living. In this way, the clock tower – a time-keeping institution especially regarding work time – established itself as a dominant highlight marking the visual center of the community.
