= Ostrovo, Bulgaria =

Ostrovo Острово
- Location of Ostrovo
- Coordinates: 43°41′17.17″N 26°36′26.61″E
- Country: Bulgaria
- Provinces (Oblast): Razgrad

Government
  - Kmet: Behçet Hacıveli
- Elevation: 298 m (978 ft)

Population (March 2016)
  - Total: 2,968
- Time zone: UTC+2 (EET)
  - Summer (DST): UTC+3 (EEST)
- Postal Code: 7326
- Area code: 084462

Ostrovo (Bulgarian: Острово; Turkish: Adaköyü) is a village in northeastern Bulgaria, part of Razgrad Province, located in the geographic region of Ludogorie. As of March 2016, the village has a population of 2968 inhabitants.

== Public institutions ==
The village has a community center "Father Paisii", primary school "Hristo Botev" and kindergarten "Joy". 3½ km east of the village is a hunting farm "Voden". The local football club Adaspor competes in the A district football group.
