= Loznitsa Municipality =

Loznitsa Municipality Община Лозница
- Municipality
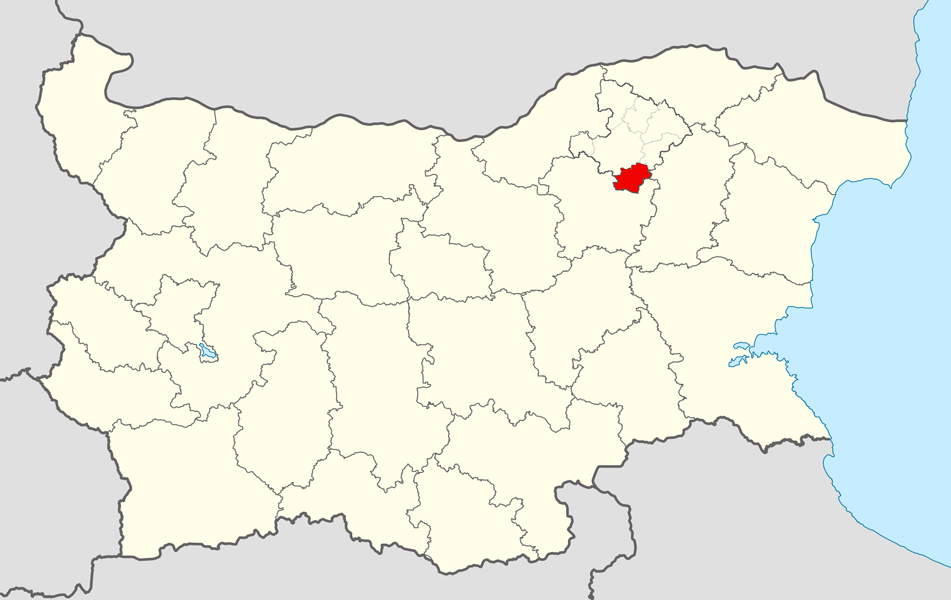
- Loznitsa Municipality within Bulgaria and Razgrad Province.
- Coordinates: 43°23′N 26°36′E
- Country: Bulgaria
- Province (Oblast): Razgrad
- Admin. centre (Obshtinski tsentar): Loznitsa

Area
  - Total: 249.48 km^{2} (96.32 sq mi)

Population (December 2009)
  - Total: 9,732
  - Density: 39.01/km^{2} (101.0/sq mi)
- Time zone: UTC+2 (EET)
  - Summer (DST): UTC+3 (EEST)

Loznitsa Municipality (Bulgarian: Община Лозница) is a municipality (obshtina) in Razgrad Province, Northeastern Bulgaria, located in the Danubian Plain. It is named after its administrative centre - the town of Loznitsa.

The municipality embraces a territory of 249.48 km^{2} (96.32 sq mi) with a population of 9,732 inhabitants, as of December 2009.

The area contains the Beli Lom Reservoir, developed along the river of the same name. The main road II-49 crosses the municipality from north to south connecting the province centre of Razgrad with the city of Targovishte and respectevly the Danube Bridge with the Kotel pass in the eastern Stara planina mountain.

== Settlements ==
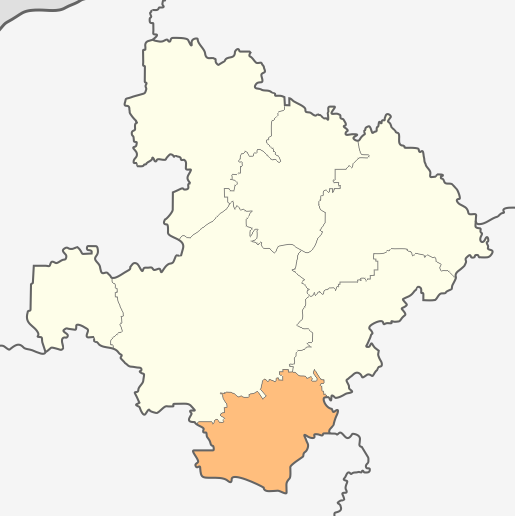
Loznitsa Municipality within Razgrad Province

Loznitsa Municipality includes the following 16 places (towns are shown in bold):

Town/Village	Cyrillic	Population (December 2009)
**Loznitsa**	**Лозница**	2,409
Beli Lom	Бели Лом	751
Chudomir	Чудомир	375
Gorotsvet	Гороцвет	412
Gradina	Градина	318
Kamenar	Каменар	587
Kroyach	Крояч	143
Lovsko	Ловско	700
Manastirsko	Манастирско	166
Manastirtsi	Манастирци	301
Seydol	Сейдол	505
Sinya Voda	Синя вода	878
Studenets	Студенец	488
Trapishte	Трапище	589
Trabach	Тръбач	188
Veselina	Веселина	922
Total		9,732

== Demography ==
The following table shows the change of the population during the last four decades.

Loznitsa Municipality
**Year**	1975	1985	1992	**2001**	2005	2007	2009	**2011**
**Population**	15,283	14,050	11,885	15,067	10,355	10,045	9,732	...
Sources: Census 2001, Census 2011, „pop-stat.mashke.org“,

=== Religion ===
According to the latest Bulgarian census of 2011, the religious composition, among those who answered the optional question on religious identification, was the following:

Religious composition of Loznitsa Municipality
Orthodox Christianity	20.8%
Catholicism	0.1%
Protestantism	0.0%
Islam	71.9%
No religion	1.8%
Prefer not to answer, others and indefinable	5.4%

== See also ==
- Provinces of Bulgaria
- Municipalities of Bulgaria
- List of cities and towns in Bulgaria
