= Samuil (village) =

Samuil Самуил
- Location of Samuil
- Coordinates: 43°31′N 26°45′E
- Country: Bulgaria
- Provinces (Oblast): Razgrad

Government
  - Mayor: Beytula Myumyun
- Elevation: 501 m (1,644 ft)

Population (December 2009)
  - Total: 1,543
- Time zone: UTC+2 (EET)
  - Summer (DST): UTC+3 (EEST)
- Postal Code: 7454
- Area code: 08377

Samuil (Bulgarian: Самуил [sɐmuˈiɫ]; Turkish: Işıklar) is a village in northeastern Bulgaria, part of Razgrad Province, located in the geographic region of Ludogorie. It is the administrative centre of the homonymous Samuil Municipality, which lies in the southeastern part of the Province. As of December 2009, the village has a population of 1,543 inhabitants.

Samuil lies among the Samuil Heights in the Ludogorie Plateau, near the second highest hill in the Danubian Plain (501 metres). The population consists of Bulgarians, Turks and Romani. The area was inhabited by the Getae and the Romans in Antiquity and by the Slavs and Bulgars in the Middle Ages. It was part of the First Bulgarian Empire and the Second Bulgarian Empire, but fell under Ottoman rule as early as 1388. The construction of Baron Hirsch's Rousse-Kaspichan-Varna railway line in 1867-1868 turned the small village of Ishiklar into a railway station of local importance, with the first settlers being Greek merchants and harvesters. After the Liberation of Bulgaria, many Bulgarians settled in the village, which was renamed to Gara Samuil ("Samuil Station") and then to Samuil in honour of the medieval tsar Samuil of Bulgaria.

== Municipality ==
Samuil municipality covers an area of 250 square kilometres and includes the following 14 places:

- Bogdantsi
- Bogomiltsi
- Golyam Izvor
- Golyama Voda
- Huma
- Harsovo
- Kara Mihal
- Krivitsa
- Nozharovo
- Pchelina
- Samuil
- Vladimirovtsi
- Zdravets
- Zhelyazkovets

Ethnic Turks constitute 75% of the population, Bulgarians being 14% and Roma 11%.
