= Konevo, Kharovsky District, Vologda Oblast =

Konevo Конево
- Village
- Location within Vologda Oblast Location within Russia
- Coordinates: 60°03′N 40°03′E
- Country: Russia
- Region: Vologda Oblast
- District: Kharovsky District
- Time zone: UTC+3:00

Konevo (Russian: Конево) is a rural locality (a village) in Kubenskoye Rural Settlement, Kharovsky District, Vologda Oblast, Russia. The population was 6 as of 2002.

== Geography ==
Konevo is located 16 km northwest of Kharovsk (the district's administrative centre) by road. Sorozhino is the nearest rural locality.
