= Isperih =

Isperih Исперих
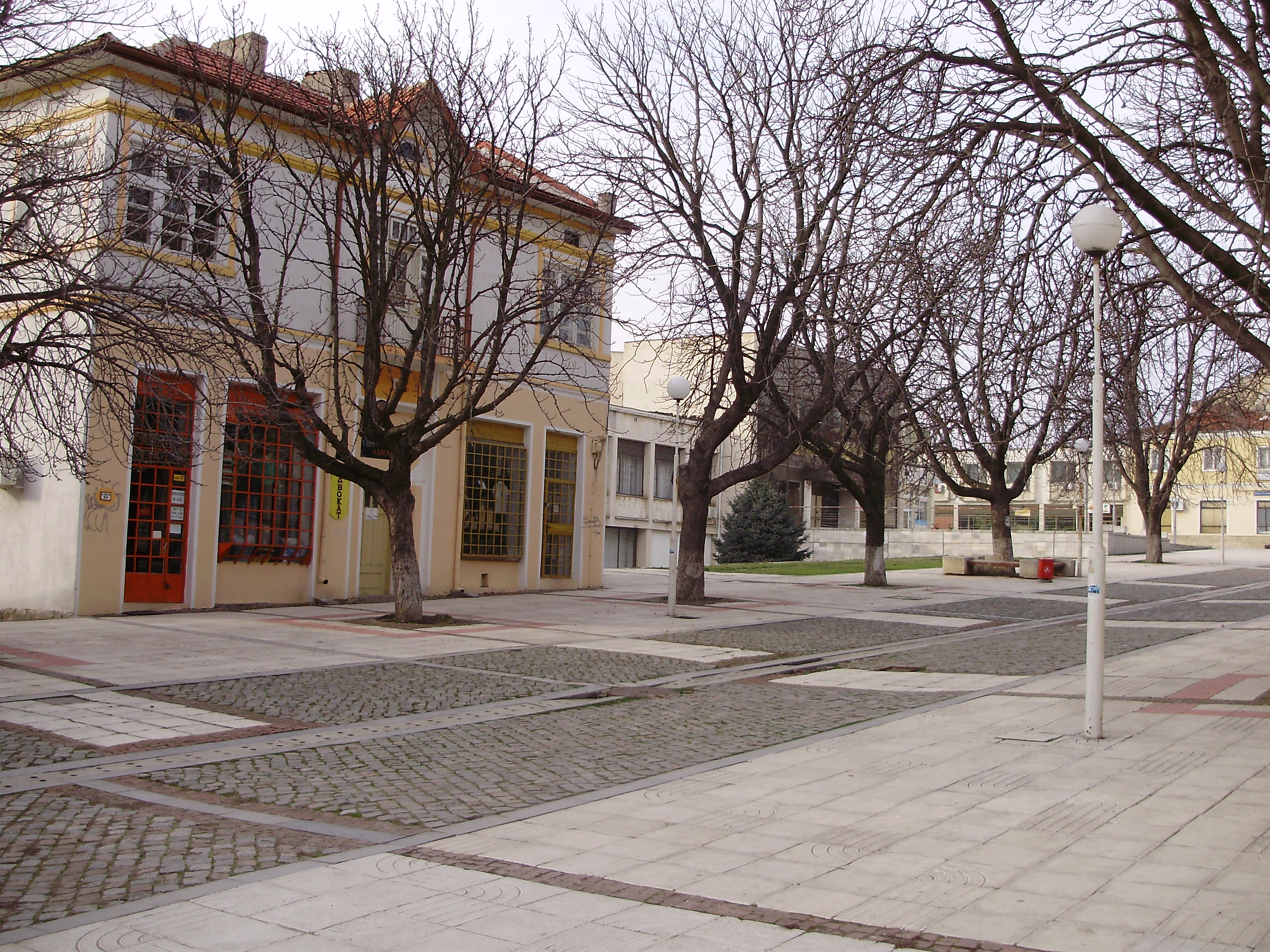
- View of central Isperih

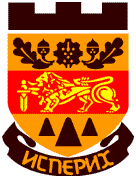
- Coat of arms

- Location of Isperih
- Coordinates: 43°43′N 26°50′E
- Country: Bulgaria
- Province (Oblast): Razgrad

Government
  - Mayor: Belgin Shukri
- Elevation: 241 m (791 ft)

Population (31 December 2024)
  - City: 7,107
  - Urban: 22,556
- Time zone: UTC+2 (EET)
  - Summer (DST): UTC+3 (EEST)
- Postal Code: 7400
- Area code: 08331

Isperih (Bulgarian: Исперих [ispɛˈrix]; Turkish: Kemallar) is a town in northeastern Bulgaria, part of Razgrad Province, situated in the central part of the Ludogorie region. It is the administrative centre of the eponymous Isperih Municipality. As of December 2024, the town had a population of 7,107.Isperih was called Kemallar during the Ottoman rule of Bulgaria and was later renamed in honour of Bulgarian khan Asparuh, whose name in Slavic was Isperih.

The town has a mixed population of Bulgarians and Turks, with an Orthodox church and a mosque being present. Isperih emerged in 1545 at the place of a medieval settlement, with the earliest known traces of human presence in the area dating from the Bronze Age. The village was first mentioned as Kemallar in an Ottoman tax register from 1573 and was renamed Isperih in 1934, becoming a town on 31 January 1960.

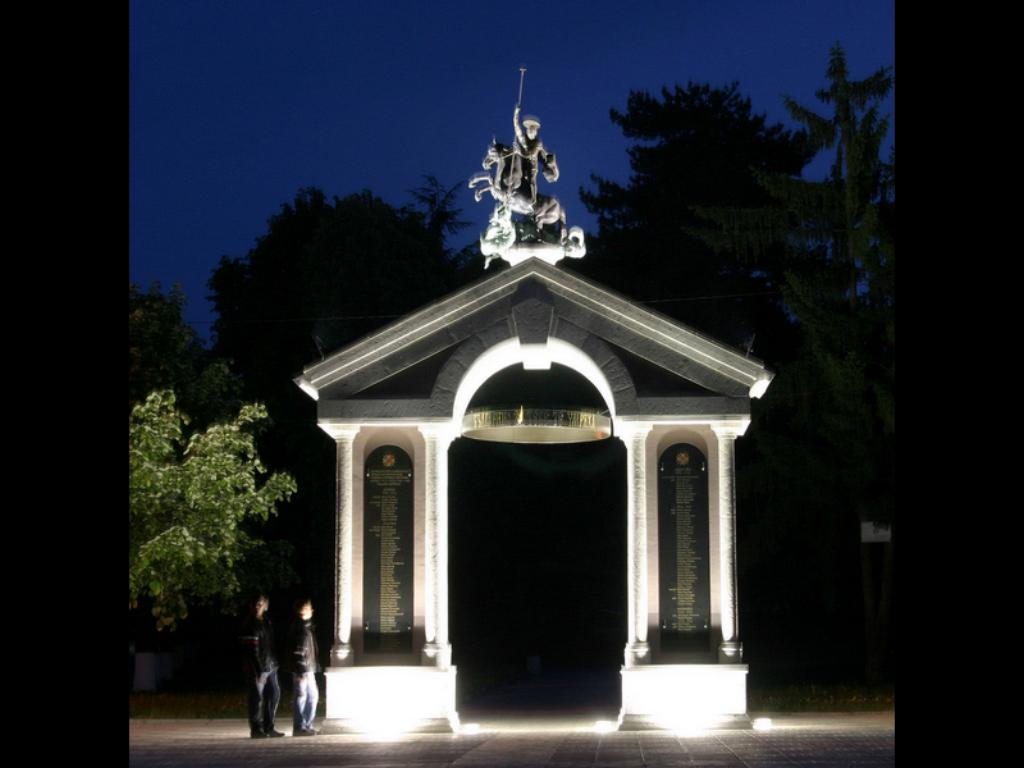
St George's Monument dedicated to Bulgarian soldiers

The Thracian Tomb of Sveshtari, a UNESCO World Heritage Site, is located nearby. Another landmark in the area is the 17th-century Bektashi Demir Baba Tekke, uniting Bektashi, Sunni, Christian and pagan traditions. The oldest active windmill in the country can also be found in Isperih municipality; it was built in the early 19th century.

== Notable people ==
- Theodosii Spassov (born 1961), Bulgarian folklore and jazz musician
- Hristina Angelakova (1944-2018), Bulgarian opera singer
- Petya Yordanova (1931-1993), Bulgarian author
- Stoyan Grozdev (1942-1994), Bulgarian journalist and cartoonist
