= Konevo, Kursk Oblast =

Rural locality in Kursk Oblast, Russia

Konevo Конево
- Khutor
- Interactive map of Konevo
- Location of Konevo Konevo (Kursk Oblast)
- Coordinates: 51°51′11″N 36°07′16″E
- Country: Russia
- Federal subject: Kursk Oblast
- Administrative district: Kursky District
- SelsovietSelsoviet: Nizhnemedveditsky

Population (2010 Census)
  - Total: 64
  - Estimate (2010): 64 (0%)

Municipal status
  - Municipal district: Kursky Municipal District
  - Rural settlement: Nizhnemedveditsky Selsoviet Rural Settlement
- Time zone: UTC+3 (MSK)
- Postal code: 305504
- Dialing code: +7 4712
- OKTMO ID: 38620448116
- Website: nmedvedica.rkursk.ru

Konevo (Russian: Конево) is a rural locality (a khutor) in Nizhnemedveditsky Selsoviet Rural Settlement, Kursky District, Kursk Oblast, Russia. Population: 64 (2010 census); 61 (2002 census);

== Geography ==
The khutor is located 97 km from the Russia–Ukraine border, 12 km north-west of Kursk, 2 km from the selsoviet center – Verkhnyaya Medveditsa.

Climate

Konevo has a warm-summer humid continental climate (Dfb in the Köppen climate classification).

== Transport ==
Konevo is located 2 km from the federal route M-2 Crimea Highway (a part of the European route E105), 6 km from the road of intermunicipal significance 38Н-379 (Kursk – Iskra), 1.5 km from the road 38Н-381 (38N-379 – Chaplygina – Alyabevo), 10.5 km from the nearest railway halt Bukreyevka (railway line Oryol – Kursk).

The rural locality is situated 15 km from Kursk Vostochny Airport, 137 km from Belgorod International Airport and 214 km from Voronezh Peter the Great Airport.
