= Razgrad =

Razgrad Разград
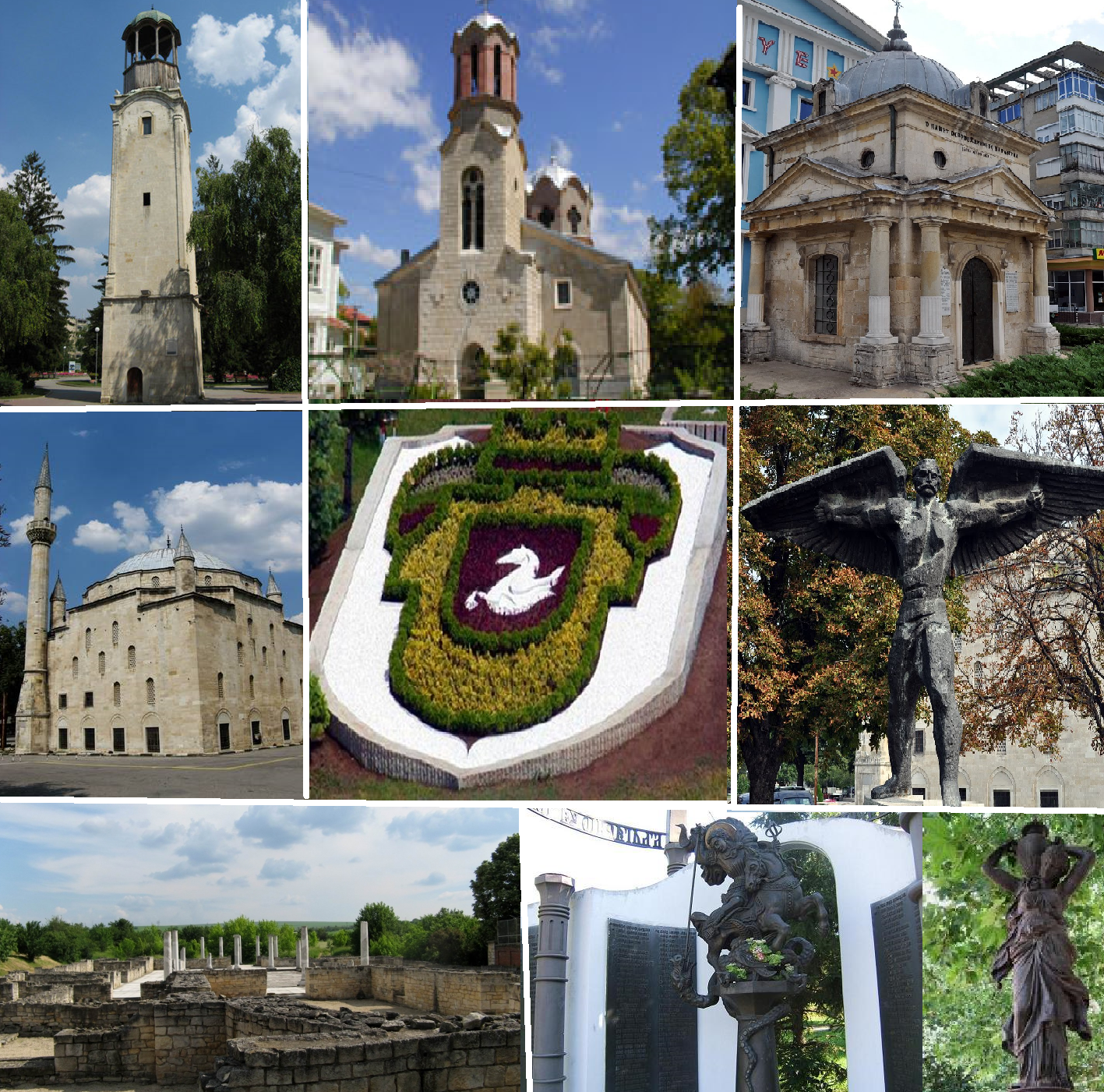

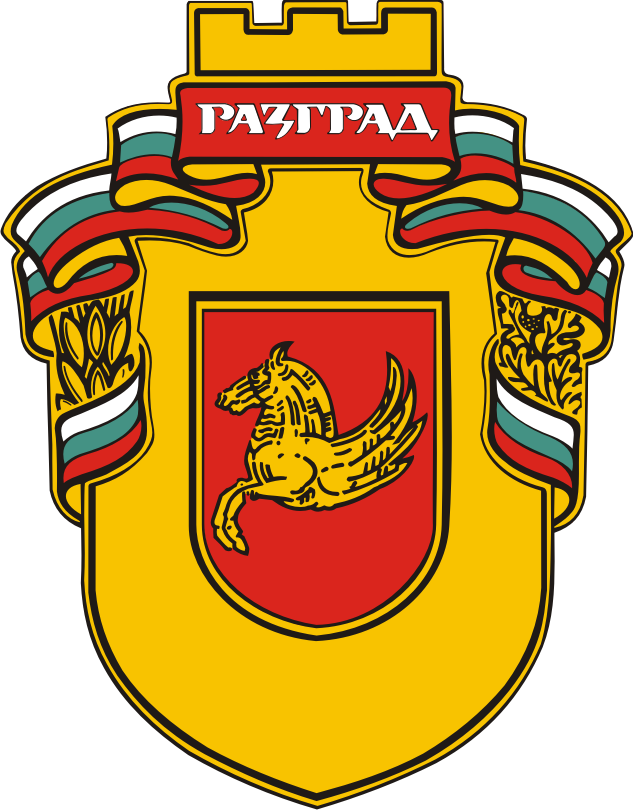
- Flag Coat of arms

- Location of Razgrad
- Coordinates: 43°32′N 26°31′E
- Country: Bulgaria
- Province: Razgrad

Government
  - Mayor: Dobrin Dobrev (non-partisan )

Area
  - City: 92.845 km^{2} (35.848 sq mi)
- Elevation: 270 m (890 ft)

Population (2015)
  - City: 28,931
  - Density: 311.61/km^{2} (807.05/sq mi)
  - Urban: 44,894
- Time zone: UTC+2 (EET)
  - Summer (DST): UTC+3 (EEST)
- Postal Code: 7200
- Area code: 084
- Website: www.razgrad.bg

Razgrad (Bulgarian: Разград [ˈrazɡrat]) is a city in Northeastern Bulgaria in the valley of the Beli Lom river that falls within the historical and geographical region of Ludogorie (Deliorman). It is an administrative centre of Razgrad Province.

== Etymology ==
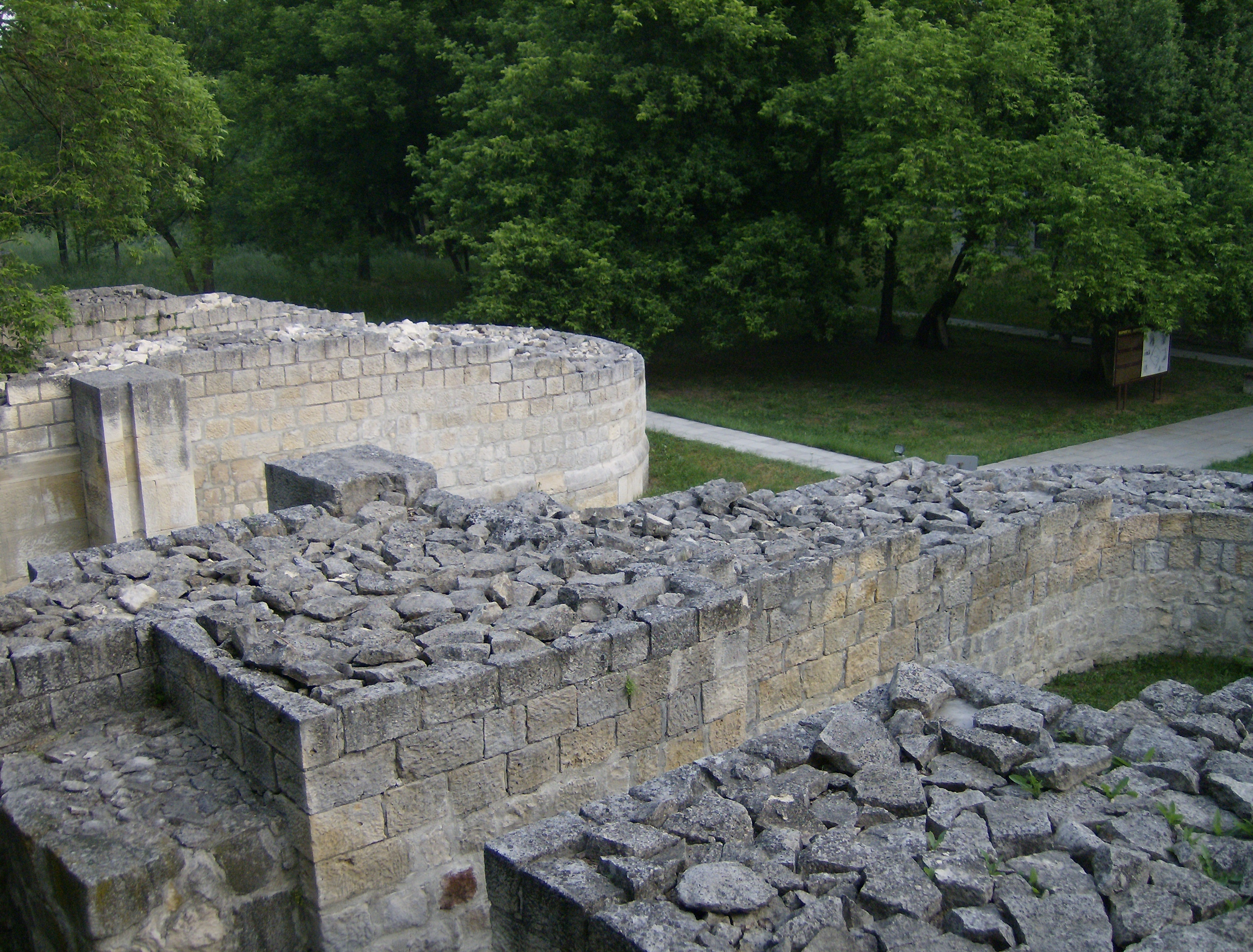
The ruins of Abrittus

The suffix "grad" means city in Bulgarian, while the origin and the meaning of the first part "raz" is obscure. During the Second Bulgarian Empire, around the present city there was a settlement, mentioned by the names of Hrasgrad, Hrazgrad, and Hrizgrad'. These names come from the name of the Bulgar and Slavic god Hors.

== History ==
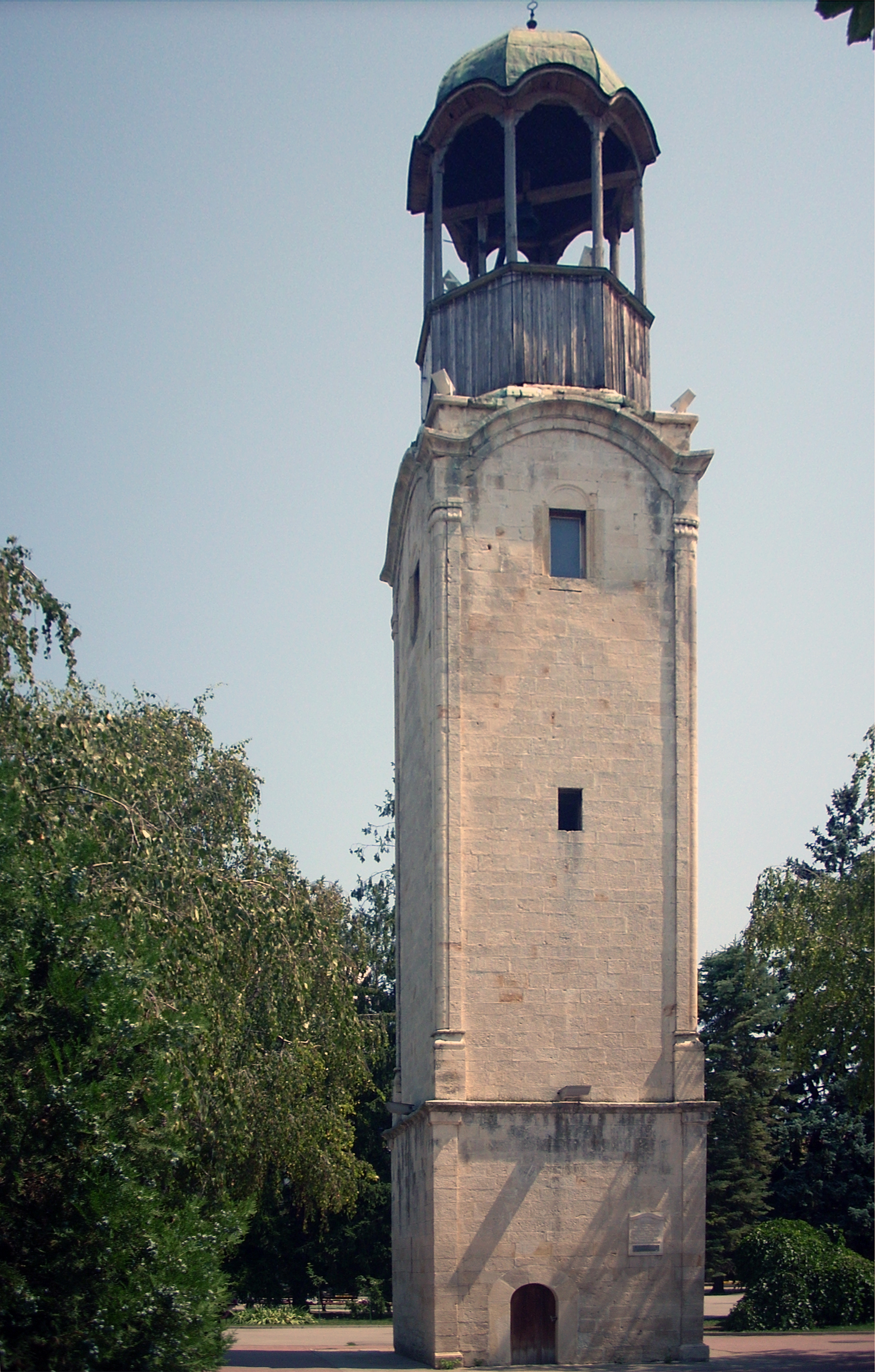
Razgrad clock tower, the symbol of the city, built in 1864

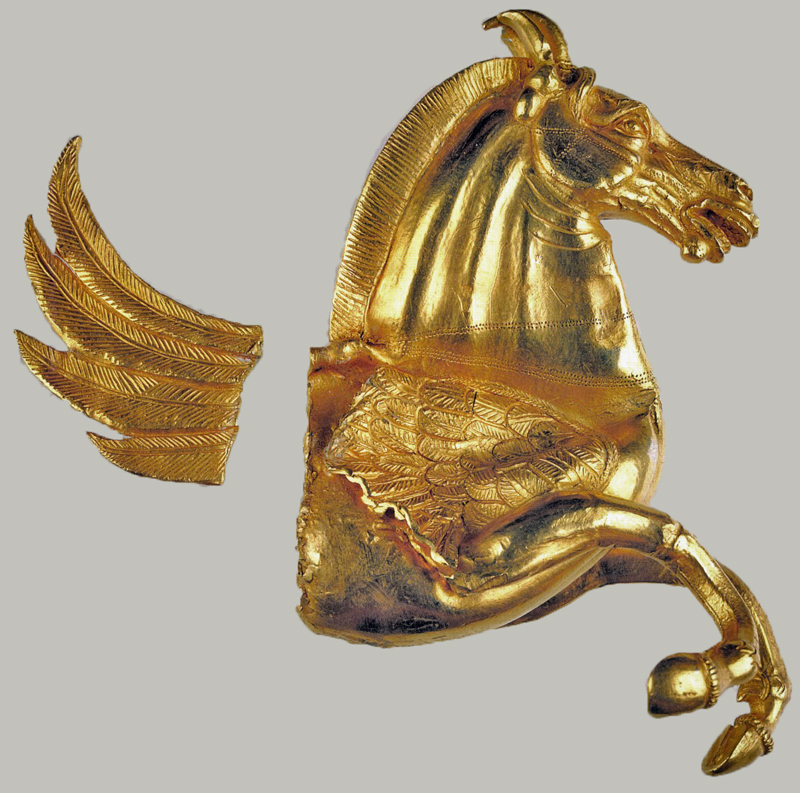
The rhyton from Vazovo became a symbol of Razgrad. It is part of the emblem of Razgrad

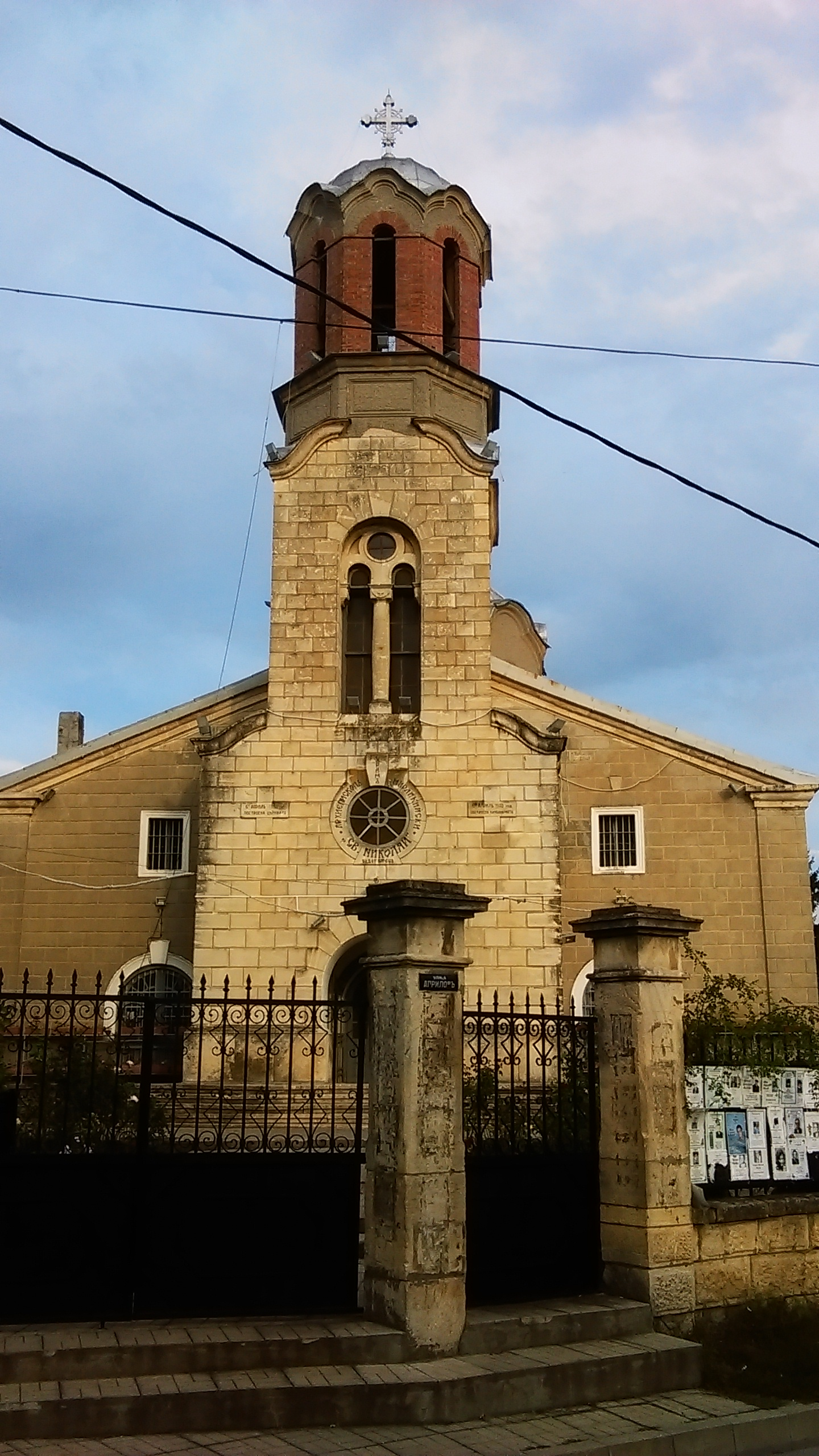
Church in Razgrad

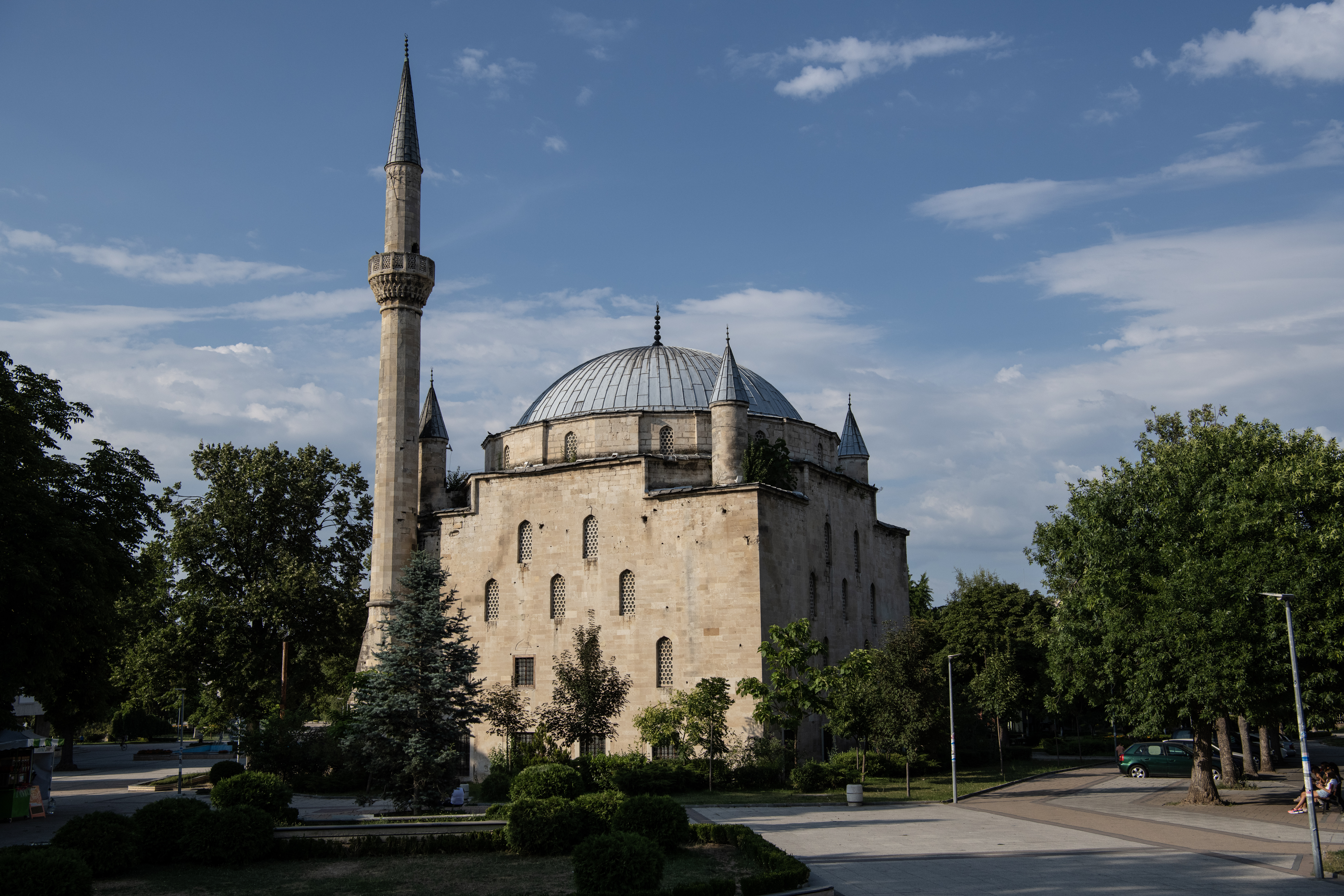
İbrahim Paşa mosque in Razgrad city centre

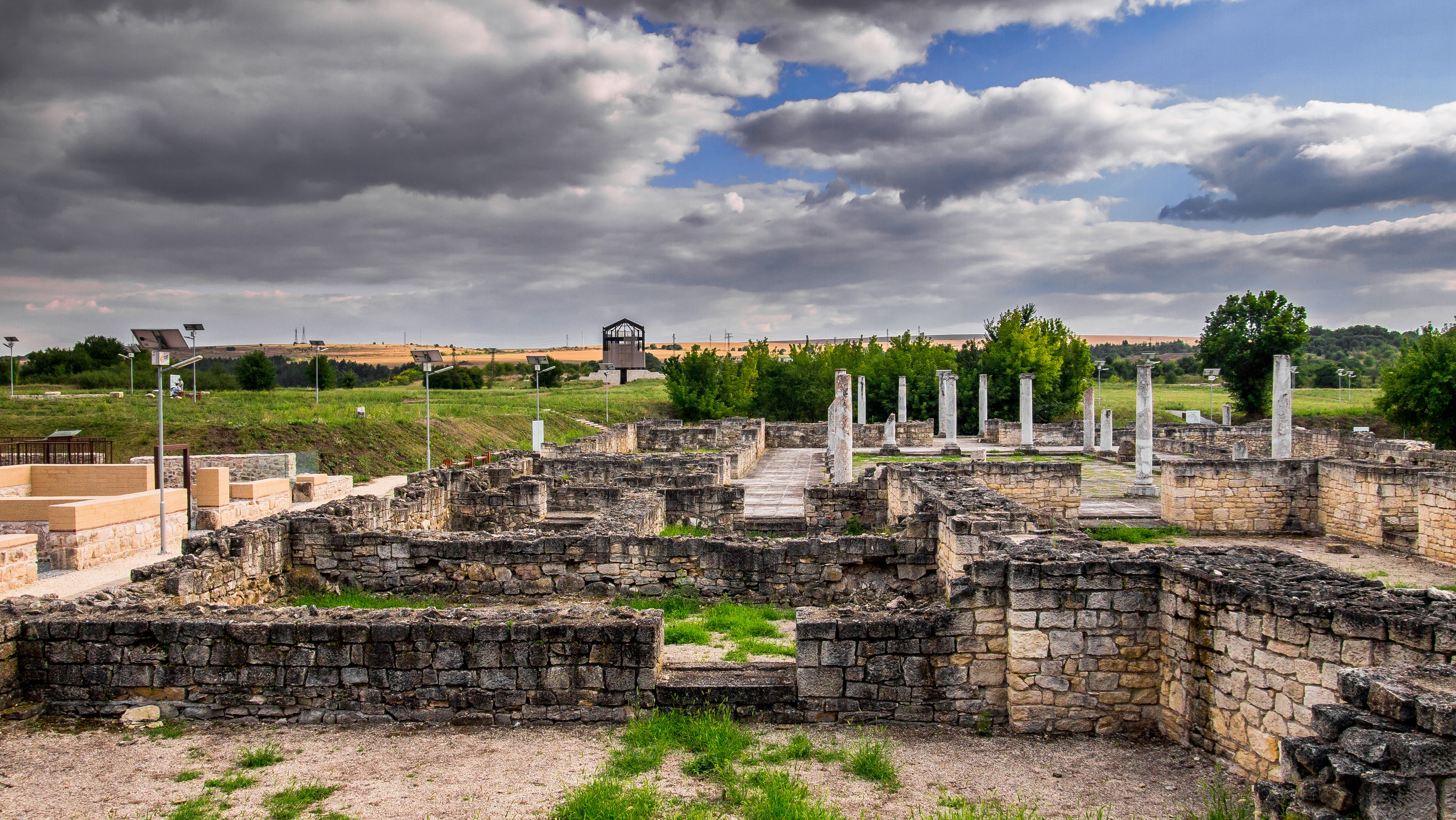
The ruins of Abritus

Razgrad was built upon the ruins of the Ancient Roman town of Abritus on the banks of the Beli Lom river. Abritus was built on a Thracian settlement of the 4th-5th century BC of unknown name. Several bronze coins of the Thracian king Seuthes III (330-300 BC) and pottery were found, as well as artifacts from other rulers and a sacrificial altar of Hercules.

In 251, the town was the site of the Battle of Abrittus, during which the Goths defeated a Roman army under the emperors Trajan Decius and Herennius Etruscus. The battle is notable for being the first occasion of a Roman emperor being killed in a battle with barbarians.

Some of Razgrad's landmarks include the Varosha architectural complex from the 19th century, the ethnographic museum and several other museums, the distinctive Razgrad clock tower in the centre built in 1864, the St Nicholas the Miracle Worker Church from 1860, the Momina cheshma sculpture, the Mausoleum Ossuary of the Liberators (1879–1880) and the Ibrahim Pasha Mosque from 1530. The mosque is said to be one of the largest in the Balkans.

In 1933 the Turkish cemetery in the city was attacked and the dead bodies were exhumed.

Razgrad Peak on Greenwich Island in the South Shetland Islands, Antarctica is named after Razgrad.

== Population ==
In January 2012, 33,416 people inhabited Razgrad’s city limits. When the legally affiliated adjacent villages are included, Razgrad Municipality had 50,457 inhabitants. The city itself reached its peak in the period 1988-1991, when its population exceeded 55,000. The following table presents the population change after 1887.

Razgrad
Year	1887	1910	1934	1946	1956	1965	1975	1985	1992	2001	2005	2009	2011	2021
Population	11,752	13,957	15,421	15,010	18,389	26,398	42,609	49,582	40,906	38,948	35,932	34,592	33,880	28,931
	Highest number 58,112 in 1991													
Sources: National Statistical Institute, citypopulation.de, pop-stat.mashke.org, Bulgarian Academy of Sciences

=== Ethnic composition ===
According to the latest 2011 census data, the individuals declared their ethnic identity were distributed as follows:

- Bulgarians: 24,701 (79.1%)
- Turks: 5,902 (18.9%)
- Roma: 288 (0.9%)
- Others: 140 (0.4%)
- Indefinable: 195 (0.6%)
  - Undeclared: 2,654 (7.8%)

Total: 33,880

The Razgrad Province has the second largest Turkish population in Bulgaria behind the Kardzhali Province, though the municipality and the city of Razgrad have a lower proportion of Turks than the rest of the province.

== Sports culture ==
In sports, Razgrad is notable for being home to the association football club Ludogorets Razgrad, who became a dominant force in Bulgarian football after winning fourteen consecutive Bulgarian First League in the 2010s and 2020s. After reaching the UEFA Europa League round of 16 during the 2013–14 season, the club also made their UEFA Champions League debut appearance a season later. Ludogorets play their home matches at Ludogorets Arena, a venue with a capacity for 10,500 people.

== Geography ==
=== Climate ===
Climate data for Razgrad, Bulgaria (1991-2020, extremes since 2021), Station height: 334.9
Month	Jan	Feb	Mar	Apr	May	Jun	Jul	Aug	Sep	Oct	Nov	Dec	Year
Record high °C (°F)	20.4 (68.7)	23.7 (74.7)	28.6 (83.5)	31.1 (88.0)	33.5 (92.3)	38.0 (100.4)	40.6 (105.1)	38.7 (101.7)	36.9 (98.4)	34.5 (94.1)	29.8 (85.6)	20.9 (69.6)	40.6 (105.1)
Mean daily maximum °C (°F)	3.9 (39.0)	6.5 (43.7)	11.1 (52.0)	16.9 (62.4)	22.1 (71.8)	25.9 (78.6)	28.4 (83.1)	28.7 (83.7)	23.7 (74.7)	17.6 (63.7)	11.1 (52.0)	5.4 (41.7)	16.8 (62.2)
Daily mean °C (°F)	−1.1 (30.0)	1.8 (35.2)	5.8 (42.4)	11.0 (51.8)	16.2 (61.2)	20.1 (68.2)	22.4 (72.3)	22.4 (72.3)	17.5 (63.5)	11.9 (53.4)	6.5 (43.7)	1.5 (34.7)	11.3 (52.4)
Mean daily minimum °C (°F)	−3.2 (26.2)	−1.8 (28.8)	1.8 (35.2)	6.4 (43.5)	11.1 (52.0)	15.0 (59.0)	16.9 (62.4)	17.0 (62.6)	12.8 (55.0)	8.0 (46.4)	3.3 (37.9)	−1.4 (29.5)	7.2 (44.9)
Record low °C (°F)	−21.2 (−6.2)	−19.5 (−3.1)	−15.3 (4.5)	−3.0 (26.6)	1.0 (33.8)	5.9 (42.6)	11.2 (52.2)	7.1 (44.8)	1.0 (33.8)	−7.0 (19.4)	−13.8 (7.2)	−18.8 (−1.8)	−21.2 (−6.2)
Average precipitation mm (inches)	41 (1.6)	40 (1.6)	47 (1.9)	50 (2.0)	66 (2.6)	74 (2.9)	67 (2.6)	51 (2.0)	67 (2.6)	57 (2.2)	50 (2.0)	47 (1.9)	657 (25.9)
Average precipitation days (≥ 1.0 mm)	7	7	7	7	8	8	6	5	5	6	7	7	80
Average snowy days	8.2	6.9	5.3	0.4	0	0	0	0	0	0.4	2.4	6.3	29.9
Source: NOAA NCEI, Meteomanz(snow days 2005-2023, extremes since 2021)

Climate data for Razgrad, Bulgaria (2000-2014)
Month	Jan	Feb	Mar	Apr	May	Jun	Jul	Aug	Sep	Oct	Nov	Dec	Year
Mean daily maximum °C (°F)	4.0 (39.2)	6.2 (43.2)	11.7 (53.1)	16.8 (62.2)	22.5 (72.5)	26.0 (78.8)	28.7 (83.7)	28.9 (84.0)	23.8 (74.8)	17.7 (63.9)	11.9 (53.4)	5.1 (41.2)	17.0 (62.6)
Daily mean °C (°F)	0.5 (32.9)	1.6 (34.9)	6.9 (44.4)	11.6 (52.9)	17.1 (62.8)	20.7 (69.3)	23.1 (73.6)	23.2 (73.8)	18.5 (65.3)	13.1 (55.6)	8.1 (46.6)	1.7 (35.1)	12.2 (54.0)
Mean daily minimum °C (°F)	−3.1 (26.4)	−1.8 (28.8)	2.1 (35.8)	6.5 (43.7)	11.6 (52.9)	15.1 (59.2)	17.5 (63.5)	17.5 (63.5)	13.2 (55.8)	8.5 (47.3)	4.2 (39.6)	−1.6 (29.1)	7.5 (45.5)
Average rainfall mm (inches)	42 (1.7)	37 (1.5)	35 (1.4)	50 (2.0)	58 (2.3)	67 (2.6)	42 (1.7)	31 (1.2)	35 (1.4)	50 (2.0)	63 (2.5)	49 (1.9)	560 (22.0)
Source: Stringmeteo.com

== Notable people ==
- Sofu Mehmed Pasha (died 1626), Ottoman administrator
- Ivan Ivanov Bagryanov (1891–1945), Bulgarian politician who briefly served as Prime Minister
- Petar Gabrovski (1898–1945), Bulgarian politician who briefly served as Prime Minister
- Dimitar Nenov (1901–1953), Bulgarian classical pianist, composer, music pedagogue and architect
- Boncho Novakov (born 1935), Bulgarian former cyclist
- Osman Duraliev (1939–2011), Bulgarian freestyle wrestler
- Ali Dinçer (1945–2007), Turkish politician, former mayor of Ankara and former government minister
- Emanuil Dyulgerov (1955–2023), Bulgarian former athlete
- Stoycho Stoev (born 1962), Bulgarian former footballer and manager
- Diyan Angelov (born 1964), Bulgarian former football player
- Mecnur Çolak (1967–2021), Turkish former footballer
- Nikolay Antonov (born 1968), Bulgarian former athlete
- Şoray Uzun (born 1968), Turkish comedian, writer and television host
- Neriman Özsoy (born 1988), Turkish female volleyball player

== Twin towns and sister cities ==
Razgrad is twinned with:

- Oryol, Russia (since 1968)
- Szombathely, Hungary (since 1992)
- Wittenberge, Germany (since 2001)
- Armagh, Northern Ireland, United Kingdom (since 1995)
- Châlons-en-Champagne, France (since 1975)
- Avcılar, Istanbul, Turkey (since 2000)
- Yangzhou, People's Republic of China (since 2000)
- Brunswick, Ohio, United States (since 1998)
- Poznań, Poland (since 2006)
- Assen, Netherlands (since 2006)
- Călărași, Romania (since 2007)
- Thessaloniki, Greece (since 2008)
