= Razgrad Province =

Province in northeastern Bulgaria

Coordinates: 43°30′N 26°35′E

Razgrad Province Област Разград
- Province
- Flag

- Location of Razgrad Province in Bulgaria
- Country: Bulgaria
- Capital: Razgrad
- Municipalities: 7

Area
  - Total: 2,639.7 km^{2} (1,019.2 sq mi)

Population (December 2022)
  - Total: 101,107
  - Density: 38.302/km^{2} (99.203/sq mi)
- Time zone: UTC+2 (EET)
  - Summer (DST): UTC+3 (EEST)
- License plate: PP
- Website: razgrad-oblast.egov.bg/wps/portal/district-razgrad/home

Razgrad Province (Bulgarian: Област Разград (Oblast Razgrad), former name Razgrad okrug) is a province in Northeastern Bulgaria, geographically part of the Ludogorie region. It is named after its administrative and industrial centre: the town of Razgrad. As of December 2009, the Province had a total population of 132,740, on a territory of 2,639.7 km^{2} (1,019.2 sq mi) that is divided into seven municipalities.

== Municipalities ==
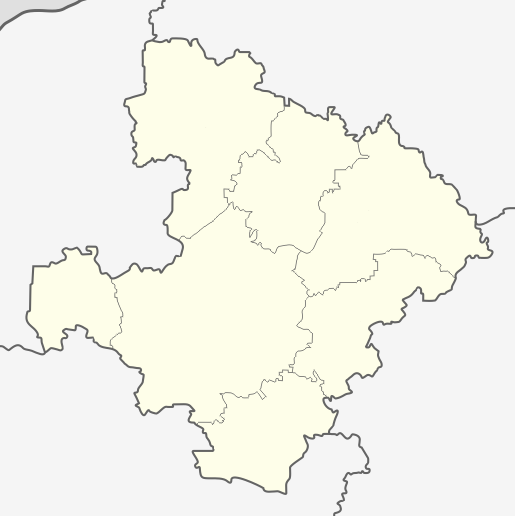

The Razgrad province (област, oblast) contains seven municipalities (singular: община, obshtina - plural: общини, obshtini). The following table shows the names of each municipality in English and Cyrillic, the main town or village (towns are shown in bold), and the population of each as of 2009.

Municipality	Cyrillic	Pop.	Town/Village	Pop.
Isperih	Исперих	22,916	**Isperih**	9,017
Kubrat	Кубрат	20,198	**Kubrat**	8,118
Loznitsa	Лозница	9,732	**Loznitsa**	2,409
Razgrad	Разград	54,720	**Razgrad**	34,592
Samuil	Самуил	7,522	Samuil	1,543
Tsar Kaloyan	Цар Калоян	6,314	**Tsar Kaloyan**	3,856
Zavet	Завет	11,338	**Zavet**	3,371

== Demographics ==
Historical population
Year	Pop.	±%
1946	184,404	—
1956	188,401	+2.2%
1965	198,903	+5.6%
1975	191,477	−3.7%
1985	186,674	−2.5%
1992	160,645	−13.9%
2001	146,345	−8.9%
2011	125,190	−14.5%
2021	103,223	−17.5%
Source: pop-stat.mashke.org

The Razgrad province had a population of 152,417 according to a 2001 census, of which 49.2% were male and 50.8% were female.

As of the end of 2009, the population of the province, announced by the Bulgarian National Statistical Institute, numbered 132,740 of which 23.1% are inhabitants aged over 60 years.

Since 1992 the former municipality of Senovo has been detached from the Razgrad Province and population changes in the table reflect this separation.

=== Ethnic groups ===
Ethnic groups in Razgrad Province (2011 census)
Ethnic group	Percentage
Turks	50.0%
Bulgarians	43.0%
Romani	5.0%
others and indefinable	2.0%

The population of Razgrad Province is ethnically mixed, with a slight Turkish majority. According to the 2001 census, the main ethnic group are the Bulgarians (67,069), the Turks (71,963) and the Roma (8,733).

Total population (2011 census): 125 190

Ethnic groups (2011 census): Identified themselves: 114,475 people:

- Turks: 57,261 (50,02%)
- Bulgarians: 49,229 (43,00%)
- Romani: 5,719 (5,00%)
- Others and indefinable: 2,266 (1,98%)

A further 10,000 people in Razgrad Province did not declare their ethnic group at the 2011 census.

=== Religion ===
Religious adherence in the province according to 2001 census:

Census 2001
religious adherence	population	%
Muslims	81,835	53.69%
Orthodox Christians	65,480	42.96%
Protestants	228	0.15%
Roman Catholics	207	0.14%
Other	566	0.37%
Religion not mentioned	4,101	2.69%
**total**	**152,417**	100%

== See also ==
- Provinces of Bulgaria
- List of villages in Razgrad Province
