= Ludogorie =

Region of northeastern Bulgaria

Coordinates: 43°30′N 26°45′E

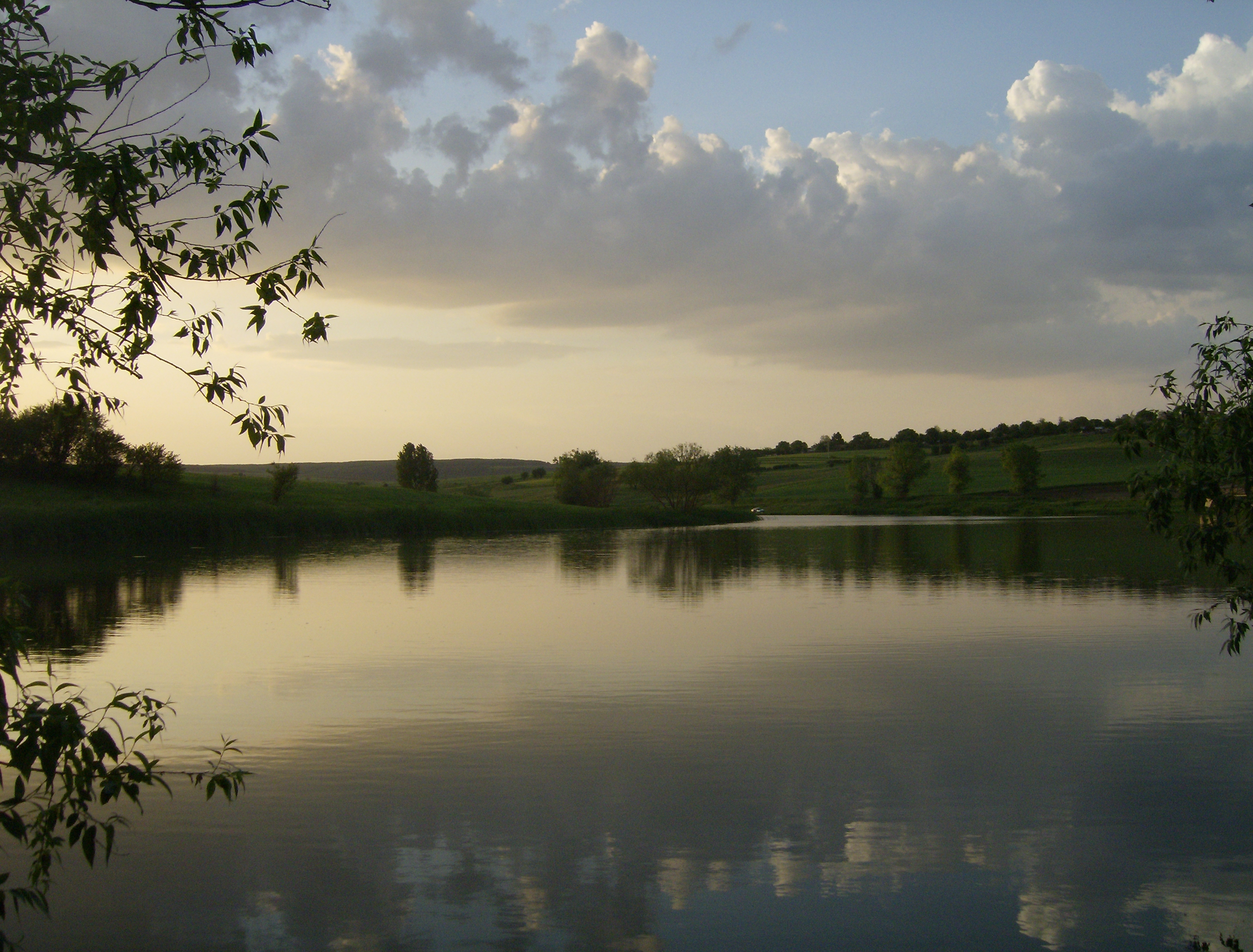
Sunset over southern Ludogorie

The Ludogorie (Bulgarian: Лудогорие) (Note: usually used with a definite article Лудогорието, Ludogorieto) or Deliorman (Делиорман; Turkish: Deli Orman, lit. 'mad forest' and Bulgarian: lud - "mad", "crazy" and gora - "forest"), is a region in northeastern Bulgaria stretching over the plateau of the same name. Major cities in the region are Targovishte, Razgrad, Dulovo, Novi Pazar, Pliska, Preslav, and Isperih. Part of the Danubian Plain, the region is hilly in the east, reaching up to 485.70 metres (1,593.5 ft) in height near the village of Samuil, but merges with the plains of Dobruja and the Danube to the north, with the lowest point near Yuper (39.14 m (128.4 ft)). The region is bordered to the west by the Provadiya River and the Beli Lom; to the east it transitions into the Dobruja plateau. The region has a significant ethnic Turkish minority.

The plateau was formed of Karst limestone from the Lower Cretaceous covered by loess material. Among the region's geological resources are kaolinite, fireclay and mica. The climate is temperate continental, with up to 650 millimetres (26 in) of precipitation yearly. Although the Ludogorie is poor in overground water resources, with only a few low rivers such as the Krapinets and the Kulak, it is rich in underground waters.

In ancient times, Ludogorie was inhabited by the Thracian tribes of the Getae who left behind local architectural landmarks such as the Thracian Tomb of Sveshtari, a richly decorated 3rd-century BC tomb that is a UNESCO World Heritage Site. Until the end of the 18th century, the Ludogorie was largely dominated by forests that merged with the ones of the Balkan Mountains (Stara Planina) to the south, giving the name of the region both in Bulgarian and Turkish, literally translated as "region of wild forests" in English. In recent times, the forests have been nearly completely replaced by arable land and only the woods in the Voden Reserve are the reminiscent of the former larger forest area. The soil from the chopped down forests is a rich soil with humus, very eligible for agriculture.

Ludogorie is a relatively new name, a Bulgarian calque of the older Turkish name Deliorman; it was officially introduced in 1950. In 1942, the name had been changed to Polesie, a Slavic toponym meaning "place by the woods", but this name never entered common use. The Turkish name is etymologically and semantically akin to the name of Teleorman County in southern Romania.

Ludogorie mostly belongs to Razgrad, Targovishte and Shumen Provinces, while containing parts of Ruse, Silistra and Varna Provinces. The region has a mixed population of Bulgarians, Turks and Romani. Ludogorie has attained fame for its oil wrestlers throughout time, including Koca Yusuf, Katrancı Mehmet Pehlivan and Hergeleci Ibrahim.

Ludogorie Peak on Livingston Island in the South Shetland Islands, Antarctica bears the name of the region. PFC Ludogorets Razgrad, the football club of Razgrad, was also named after the Ludogorie region.
