= Tashkopryu Mosque =

Mosque in Plovdiv, Bulgaria

Tashkyopryu Mosque
- Ташкьопрю джамия
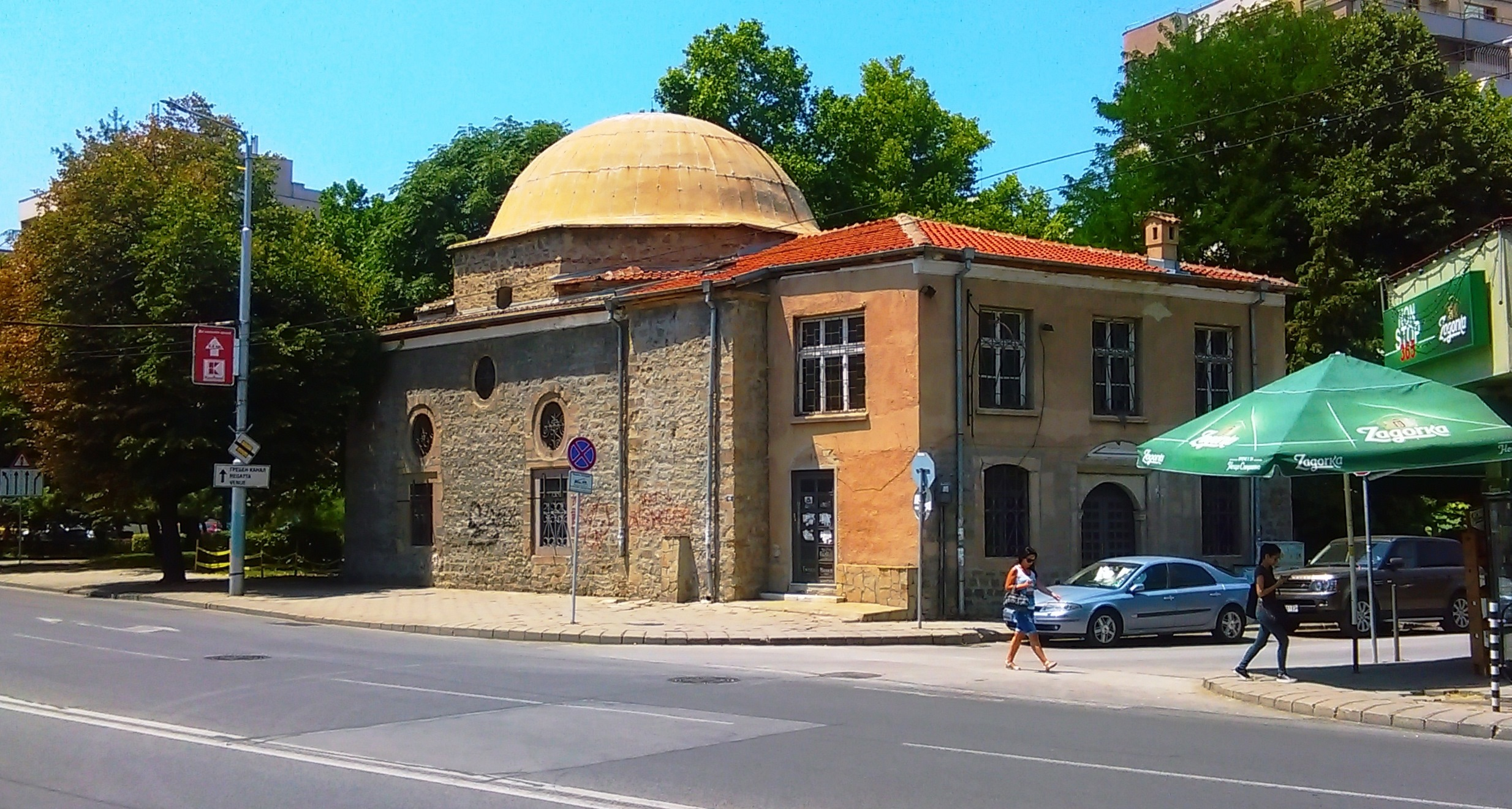
- View of the mosque in 2017

- Location of the mosque in Bulgaria

Religion
- Affiliation: Sunni Islam
- Sect: Salafi
- Ecclesiastical or organisational status: Mosque
- Status: Active

Location
- Location: Plovdiv, Plovdiv Province
- Country: Bulgaria
- Interactive map of Tashkyopryu Mosque
- Coordinates: 42°05′09″N 24°26′34″E

Architecture
- Style: Ottoman-Turkish
- Completed: 16th century

Specifications
- Length: 25 m (82 ft)
- Width: 15 m (49 ft)
- Dome: 1
- Dome dia. (outer): 10 m (33 ft)
- Minaret: 1 (collapsed in earthquake)

The Tashkyopryu Mosque (Bulgarian: Ташкьопрю джамия, romanized: Tashkyopryu Dzhamiya; Turkish: Taşköprü Camii), or the Stone Bridge Mosque, is a mosque, located in Plovdiv, Bulgaria, built by Ottoman Turks in 16th century during their 500-year rule in today's Bulgaria. It is currently the third mosque in Plovdiv which is in good condition after Dzhumaya Mosque and Imaret Mosque.

Bulgarian Turks reopened the mosque in 2025, after attacks forced the mosque's closure in 2016.

== History ==
The Tashkyopryu Mosque was built to answer the growing need of the Muslim community for worshiping places in developing Plovdiv (Filibe at that time), which was a Muslim dominated city with an 80% Turkish majority in the 16th century. The mosque was built at the western skirts of the city centre as a result of the start of Turks moving to city center from surrounding villages.

The mosque functioned properly until the First Balkan War. After the Balkan Wars, Tashkopryu Mosque kept its importance and activity until 1928, when an earthquake destroyed its minaret. To rebuild the minaret, a portion of the lot where the mosque was built was sold by the local religious authorities. However, the money collected was not enough to cover the expenses for rebuilding a minaret. As a result of this and the political atmosphere in Europe at that time, the mosque stayed closed until 1944 which marked the end era of World War II in Europe.

After the war, when the communist state, People's Republic of Bulgaria was founded in 1946, one of the first actions of government was to confiscate almost all of the Muslim worshiping places used mainly by the Turks, which composed and still composes the biggest indigenous ethnic minority in Bulgaria, including the Tashkyopryu Mosque.

After decades under communist rule, following the foundation of current Republic of Bulgaria, the properties confiscated by the communist state started to be returned to their original owners in 1989 and 1990. That was when the Chief Muftiate of Bulgaria and Muftiate of Plovdiv, religious authorities in the country, first filed a lawsuit for the mosque to be returned as their property. The first case was denied by the Bulgarian government and the mosque was sold to investors who started using the building as a bar and restaurant, which created further fervent among the religious and ethnic minority in the country.

Following 2007 enlargement of the European Union which made Bulgaria a full EU member, the Muslim and Turkish community started working more intensely for their religious properties and rights to be returned. The bar was taken out of the mosque and now an alcohol-serving restaurant functions in Tashkopryu Mosque's garden. The mosque is still inactive but the push for it to be returned and to be active again is growing.

In 2013, an option for the Chief Muftiate to buy the building and the lot for around 600,000 euros was created. However, the Turkish and religious authorities referred to the price as meaninglessly expensive and they highlighted that the mosque and its lot is their rightful property as original owners before confiscation. It was further stated that using the mosque's lot as a restaurant was like an insult.

Correspondingly, following the first attempt to file a lawsuit and a second one in which the files were "disappeared", the muftiates and Turkish organizations of Bulgaria are getting ready to file the greatest lawsuit for the ownership of the mosque and "can eventually apply to European Court of Human Rights" with possible support from authorities from Turkey for its return to its rightful owners before the city of Plovdiv hosts the European Capital of Culture 2019 event.

=== 2016 attack ===
The mosque and the Turkish "Orta Mezar Bath" just across the avenue were the targets of a night-time attempt on February 19, 2016, to instigate the historical buildings. The mosque had minor damage, possibly because of the presence of the restaurant, while the hammam (bathhouse) dome and roof were almost completely destroyed by the fire. Those responsible for the attack were not found but the evidence pointed to the racist, fascist organizations of Bulgaria or/and to football hooligans. Bulgarian court was blamed for helping the racists by obfuscating the evidence and by not working enough to find those responsible. Turkish and Muslim organizations declared disappointment and fervent over the incident, and called for the renovation of the bathhouse and return of the mosque once again.

== Current status ==
In 2024, the building became the property of the Plovdiv Mufti's Office, which began its restoration. In February 2025, shortly before the holy Muslim holiday of Ramadan, the mosque officially opened its doors for prayers.

== See also ==
- Islam in Bulgaria
- List of mosques in Bulgaria
- Ottoman Bulgaria
- Turks of Bulgaria
