= Banya Bashi Mosque clashes =

Political and religious clashes around Banya Bashi Mosque in Bulgaria

- Date: 21 May 2011
- Location: Sofia

Casualties and losses
1 Far-right supporter wounded (Denitsa Siderova)	10 wounded (5 Muslims and 5 policemen)

Banya Bashi mosque clashes (Bulgarian: Сблъсъците при Баня баши джамия; Turkish: Banyabaşı cami saldırısı or sometimes 20 Mayıs 2011 olayları) refers to clashes, which happened on 20 May 2011, when the far-right ATAKA supporters and members attacked Muslims in Sofia’s only mosque. Five Muslims, five Bulgarian policemen, and ATAKA member Denitsa Gadzheva were injured. Four provocateurs were charged. One of the injured Muslims, Veli Karaahmet, brought the case to the court in Strasbourg, and Bulgaria was penalized to pay nearly 8,000 euros to the injured man.

== Background ==
Between 10 July 2007 – 20 May 2011, 45 attacks on Islamic buildings and Muslims were recorded all over Bulgaria, including an attack on four women for wearing hijab and three other separate attacks in which three Muslims (including a child) were injured in Sofia, Dobrich, and Plovdiv.

Previous attacks on Banya Bashi mosque:

- Vandalizing the mosque with hate speech on 20 May 2010;
- Attacking a worshipper and chanting hate slogans on 6 November 2010;
- Playing Christian chants during the sala (this act was led by ATAKA as well) to “noise out the terror”.

== The incident ==
The events took place just one day after the traditional commemoration of the May protests and the expulsion of 360,000 Turks from Bulgaria in the summer of 1989 and shortly before the Bulgarian elections. Muslims gathered for Friday prayers at the city's only mosque. Since the mosque can accommodate up to 700 people (while the city has 30,000 Muslims) the remaining worshipers were forced to perform their worship in the temple courtyard. The rally started one day after the protesters got permission from the municipality to organize a protest and announced the theme "protest against the loudspeakers of the mosque". According to reports, the initial idea was to protest next to the park, close to the mosque. But later, due to the request of Volen Siderov, the protesters moved right in front of the shrine.

It was not the first time in which Siderov led a campaign against the mosque’s loudspeakers. In 2006, he gathered 35,000 signatures for the removal of the device, and another protest against the “howling” was organized, although the noise always has been adjusted to the level of urban noise.

At the very beginning, the ATAKA supporters started to shout “Turkish stooges”, “scum”, “cut-offs”, “off to Ankara”, “your feet stink, that's why you wash them” etc. One supporter cut a fes, a traditional hat, with a knife and said “we shall now show you what will happen to each one of you! The Muslims kept their composure while the imam asked all the believers from the loudspeaker not to give in to provocations and to trust the police. During the clashes, the nationalists used wooden flagpoles, metal pipes, eggs, and stones to attack the worshippers, and the last used plastic tubing. Five Muslims and five police officers were injured. Denitsa Gadzheva was the only protestor who was wounded. Her injury was caused by a stone however since the Muslims didn't use stones, it is unknown who was responsible for the wound.

== Reactions ==
The incident was criticized by Turkish president Recep Tayyip Erdoğan . Many Bulgarians brought flowers to the mosque, as an apology for the incident. President Parvanov and the Parliament condemned the incident a few days after the events.

== Aftermath ==
Two weeks later, the municipality reduced the mosque's decibels and prohibited worshiping in its courtyard. However, even after the incident, the attacks on the Muslims did not stop. A few days after the events, on 23 May, Chief Mufti’s office in Sofia was vandalized with swastikas, and on 25 May and 12 June, two believers were attacked in the same mosque. In September, an ultra-nationalist group attacked mosques in Plovdiv and Sofia. 35-year-old Veli Karaahmed, one of the wounded Muslims filed a case in Strasbourg against Bulgaria, because of the passivity of the police, the allowing of Islamophobic protests around a shrine, especially during the Friday prayer, and the lack of punishment for the perpetrators. He won the case, and Bulgaria was penalized to pay 3,000 euros for non-property damages and another 4,668 for expenses in the case.
