= Siderova =

Siderova is a surname. Notable people with the surname include:

- Denitsa Siderova (born 1982), Bulgarian politician
- Verka Siderova (1926–2025), Bulgarian folk singer
