= Ibrahim Pasha Mosque =

Ibrahim Pasha Mosque may refer to:

== Buildings ==
- Ibrahim Pasha Mosque, Razgrad, in Razgrad, Bulgaria
- Ibrahim Pasha Mosque, Rhodes, in Rhodes, Greece
- Hadim Ibrahim Pasha Mosque, in Istanbul, Turkey
