= Ibrahim Pasha Mosque, Razgrad =

Mosque in Razgrad, Bulgaria

Ibrahim Pasha Mosque
- Ибрахим паша джамия
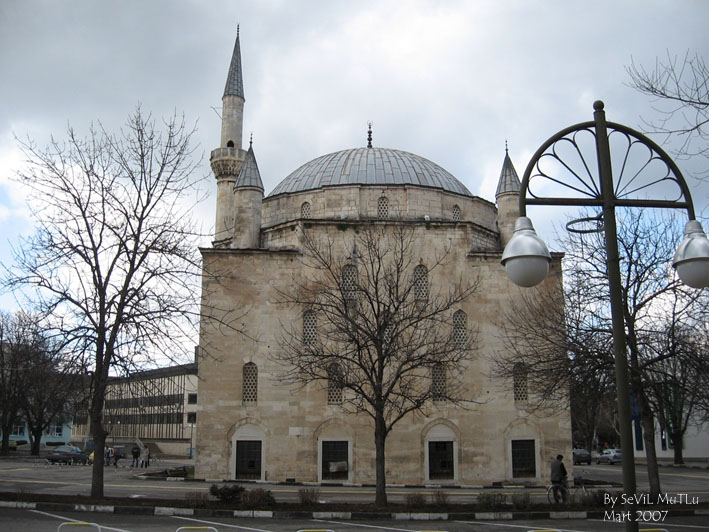

- Location within Bulgaria

Religion
- Affiliation: Islam
- Ecclesiastical or organizational status: Mosque
- Status: Active

Location
- Location: Razgrad
- Country: Bulgaria
- Interactive map of Ibrahim Pasha Mosque
- Coordinates: 43°31′32″N 26°31′25″E

Architecture
- Style: Ottoman
- Founder: Ibrahim Pasha of Parga; Mahmoud Pasha
- Completed: 1516 (first mosque); 1025 AH (1616/1617 CE) (second mosque)
- Demolished: 1610 (first mosque)

Specifications
- Dome: 1
- Minaret: 1
- Materials: Limestone

The Ibrahim Pasha Mosque (Bulgarian: Ибрахим паша джамия; Turkish: İbrahim Paşa Camisi), also known as the Maqbul Ibrahim Pasha Mosque, is one of the largest mosques on the Balkan Peninsula outside of Turkish East Thrace, and the second-largest in Bulgaria. Located in the town of Razgrad, the mosque is one of the most exquisite examples of Ottoman classical architecture.

After being closed for renovations for many years, restoration of the mosque was completed and the mosque was reopened in 2024.

== History ==
=== First mosque ===
The Mosque of Ibrahim Pasha was a mosque built by Ibrahim Pasha of Parga in Razgrad in 1533 CE, and it is believed to be the first-ever congregational mosque in Razgrad. The 1533 Deed of Trust of Ibrahim Pasha testifies on the existence of such a temple and provides information on its appearance, architecture, and staff: the mosque was built upon a firm foundation and had one-of-a-kind columns. In the courtyard of the temple, there was a fountain used for the Islamic procedure of cleansing Wudu, a Medrese-style school, 8 bathrooms, as well as a caravanserai. The mosque employed at least 12 people – three religious leaders and two teachers. There was a hammam that was operative until the 1970s. The mosque was built by a Turkish lord of ethnic Albanian origins.

It is believed that such a mosque complex, initially a waqf, was the reason why the town of Razgrad received its statute of kasaba("town").

After the death of Ibrahim Pasha in 1536 CE, construction of the mosque stopped. Although left unfinished, the mosque was functional until 1600 CE, but it was demolished between 1600–1610 CE, for unknown reasons. The most plausible hypothesis, according to Prof. Machiel Kiel, is that the mosque may have been destroyed by an earthquake. However, the question why the first mosque was torn down is still open. The remnants of the original mosque were found in 1986 during archaeological excavations.

=== Second mosque ===
Construction of the new mosque was completed in 1025 AH (1616/1617 CE); evident from the marble inscription, where the year of construction was engraved. The marble inscription also testified that even though the mosque was commenced by Ibrahim Pasha, it was finished by Mahmud Pasha. Since the building is dated to some 80 years after the death of Ibrahim Pasha, it was speculated that the mosque was named n his honour because not only was it built upon the old mosque of Ibrahim Pasha, but it was also the land on which the mosque was built belonged to the Pasha himself.

== Architecture ==
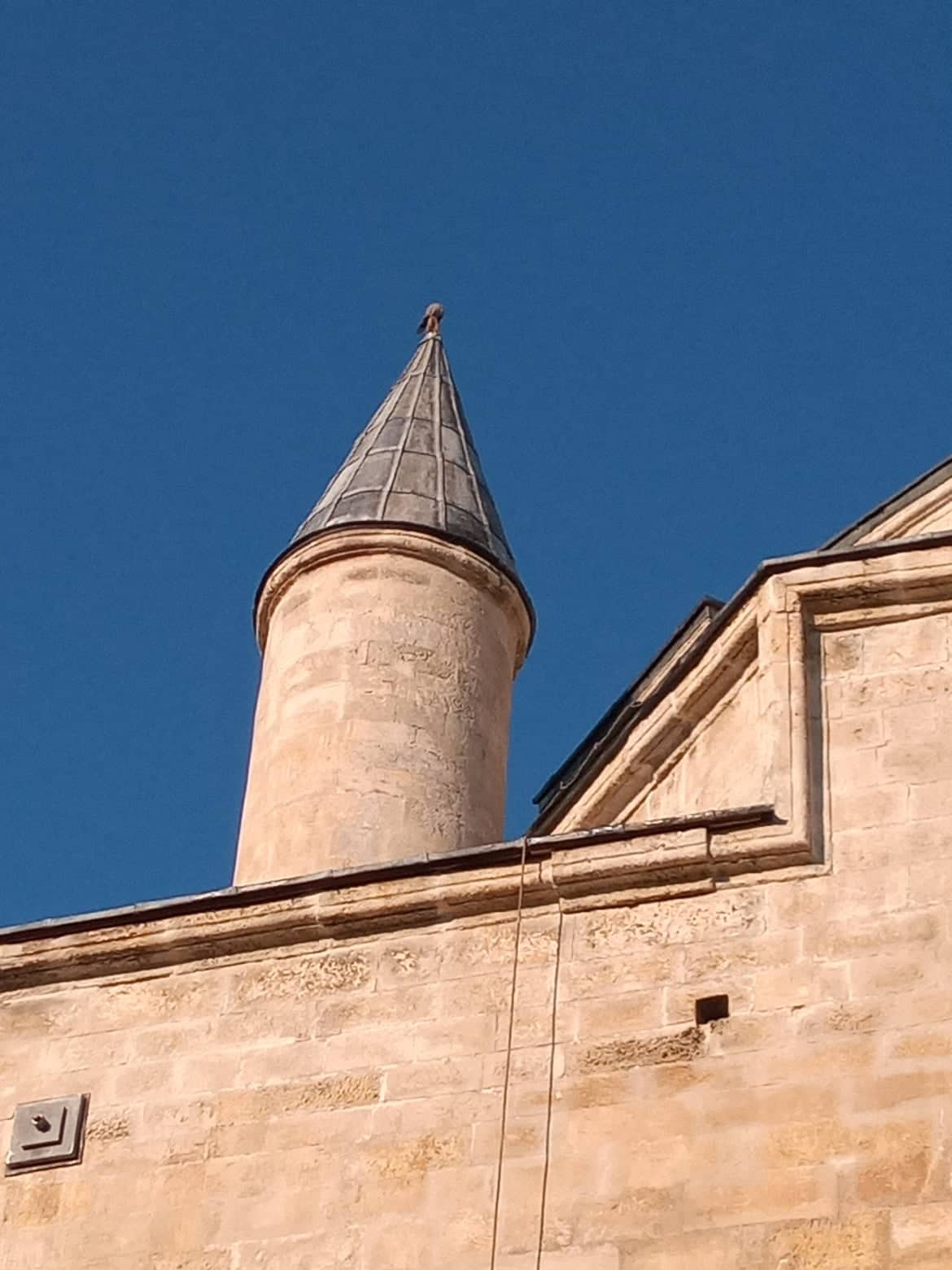
Bird house in the building of Ibrahim Pasha Mosque

The mosque style followed the trends set by Mimar Sinan, and was also influenced by a new generation of architects who challenged traditions and enriched architecture by introducing new elements.

The single-domed mosque is made entirely of limestone, built on a square base. The homogeneous limestone blocks were light-yellow in colour, with a grainy structure, and their uniform material made it unlikely that the blocks were taken from the old mosque or the Roman town of Abritus. All stones are perfectly polished and built in rows with a thin joint. Some of them were attached with iron clamps and soldered with lead – a preventive measure, used by the Ottomans to protect minarets during earthquakes. It is believed that this feature is the reason why the mosque withstood the nine earthquakes in the region between 1701 and 1997. In addition, the masons reinforced the mortar by adding egg whites.

All façades end with a common narrow and elegant classical cornice. Three of them, except for the north-western façade, are based on a stone plinth. There are 45 windows on the four façades – on three of them there are 13 windows, and on the front façade, there are six.

There are nearly 50 little birdhouse arched holes, making it the only Bulgarian monument of Ottoman heritage with so many birdhouses on its façades. This feature highlights the relationship between the Ottoman Muslims and the birds, which is highly influenced by the Quran and the Muslim concept that birds are divine creatures that live in "communities" as people do.

=== Restoration ===
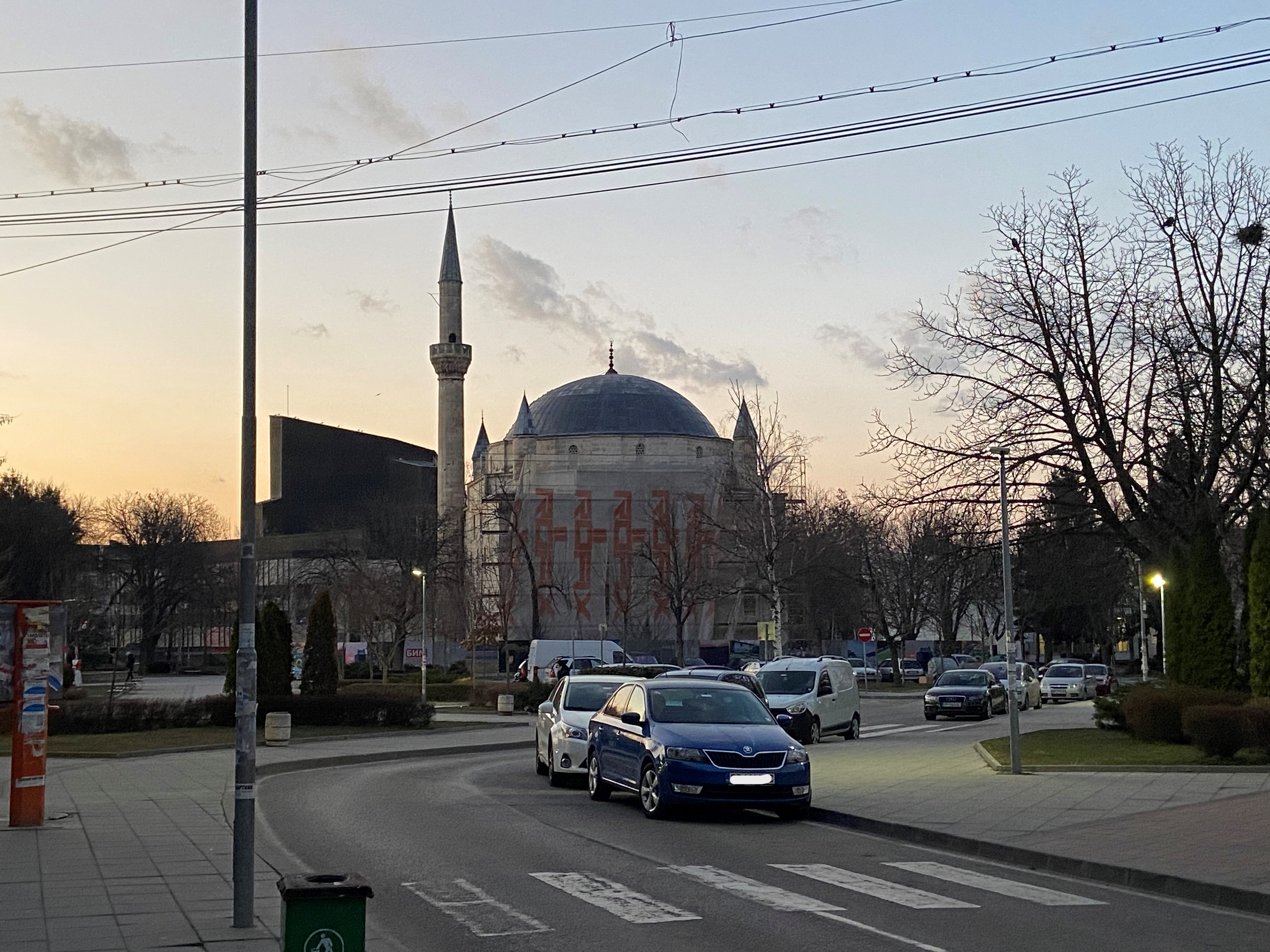
The mosque in 2022, during its restoration.

The mosque is one of the most emblematic symbols of the town of Razgrad. The mosque became a national monument of "national significance" in 1967, and, since 2001, the ruins of the old mosque were also considered an archaeological monument. From the mid-1980s, the mosque was out of service for almost 40 years.

Funded by the Turkish Cooperation and Coordination Agency (TIKA), restoration of the mosque began in 2020. The project, worth BGN 2,374,836, provided by the state budget, envisages conservation, restoration, and adaptation of the Ibrahim Pasha Mosque. The restoration was expected to be finished 800 days after its beginning (in 2023). The mosque was reopened in 2024 after extensive renovations.

== See also ==
- Islam in Bulgaria
- List of mosques in Bulgaria
- Razgrad Incident
