= List of mosques in Bulgaria =

This is a list of notable mosques in Bulgaria.

Name	Image	Location	Year (CE)	Remarks
Eski Mosque		Yambol	1373	
Eski Mosque		Haskovo	1394	
Eski Mosque		Kazanlak	1412	
Sultan bayazid Veli Mosque		Aytos	1435	
Imaret Mosque		Plovdiv	1445	
Fatih Mehmed Mosque		Kyustendil	mid-15th century	
Ahmed Bey Mosque		Kyustendil	mid-15th century	
Dzhumaya Mosque		Plovdiv	1451	
Kurshum Mosque		Karlovo	1486	
Kodzha Mahmut Pasha Mosque		Sofia	1494	
Ardino Mosque		Ardino	15th century	
Eski Mosque		Stara Zagora	15th century	
Karadzha Pasha Mosque		Gotse Delchev	late 15th century	
Eski Mosque (Tyurmeto)		Dupnitsa	late 15th century	
Ahmed Bey Mosque		Razgrad	1543 or 1558	
Kurshumlu Mosque		Pazardzhik	1574	
Banya Bashi Mosque		Sofia	1576	
Ibrahim Pasha Mosque		Razgrad	1617	
Yusuf Bey Mosque		Provadia	1623	
Old Peshtera Mosque		Gotse Delchev	1650	
Kurshumlu Mosque		Silistra	early 17th century	
Eski Mosque		Momchilgrad	17th century	
Sahat Mosque		Targovishte	1722	
Tombul Mosque		Shumen	1744	
Hadzi Hyuseyin Mosque		Belogradchik	1751	
Charshi Mosque		Haskovo	1785	
Eski Mosque		Vratsa	1786 or earlier	
Dzhebel Mosque		Dzhebel	1712 or 1789	
Central Mosque		Krichim	1800	
Osman Pazvantouglu Mosque		Vidin	1801	
Black Mosque		Karnobat	1821	
Hayrie mosque		Varna	1835	
Said Pasha Mosque		Ruse	1840	
Bayrakli Mosque		Samokov	1845	
Tashkopryu Mosque		Plovdiv	1860	
Azizie mosque		Varna	1869	
Kardzhali Mosque		Kardzhali	1812; rebuilt 1874	
Blagoevgrad Mosque		Blagoevgrad	19th century	
Seytlyar Mosque		Krumovgrad	1901	

== See also ==
- Ottoman architecture
- Islam in Bulgaria
- Lists of mosques by country
