= Recep Pasha Mosque =

Mosque in Rhodes, Greece

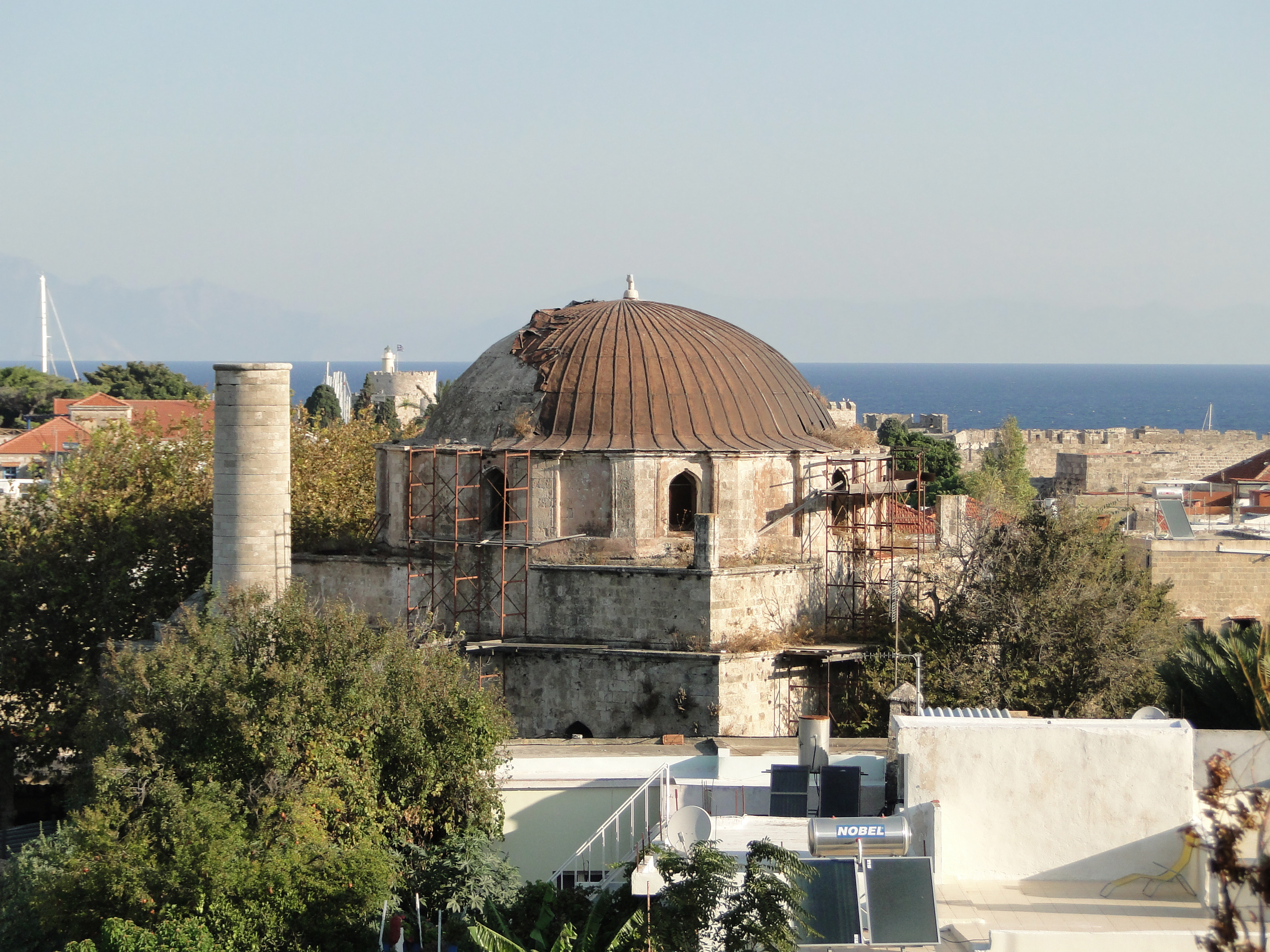
- The mosque in the old city

- Location within Greece

Religion
- Affiliation: Islam
- District: Rhodes
- Province: South Aegean
- Ecclesiastical or organizational status: Closed

Location
- Location: Rhodes, Greece
- Municipality: Rhodes
- State: Greece
- Interactive map of Recep Pasha Mosque
- Coordinates: 36°26′30″N 28°13′35″E

Architecture
- Type: Mosque
- Style: Ottoman architecture
- Founder: Topal Recep Pasha
- Completed: 1588

Specifications
- Dome: 1
- Minaret: 1 (semi-destroyed)
- Materials: Cut stone and brick

The Recep Pasha Mosque (Greek: Ρετζέπ Πασά Τζαμί, Turkish: Recep Paşa Camii) is a historical Ottoman mosque on the island of Rhodes, Greece, one of the seven mosques inside the old walled city of Rhodes. As of 2025, it is not open for either worship or visit, due to the poor condition it is in.

== History ==
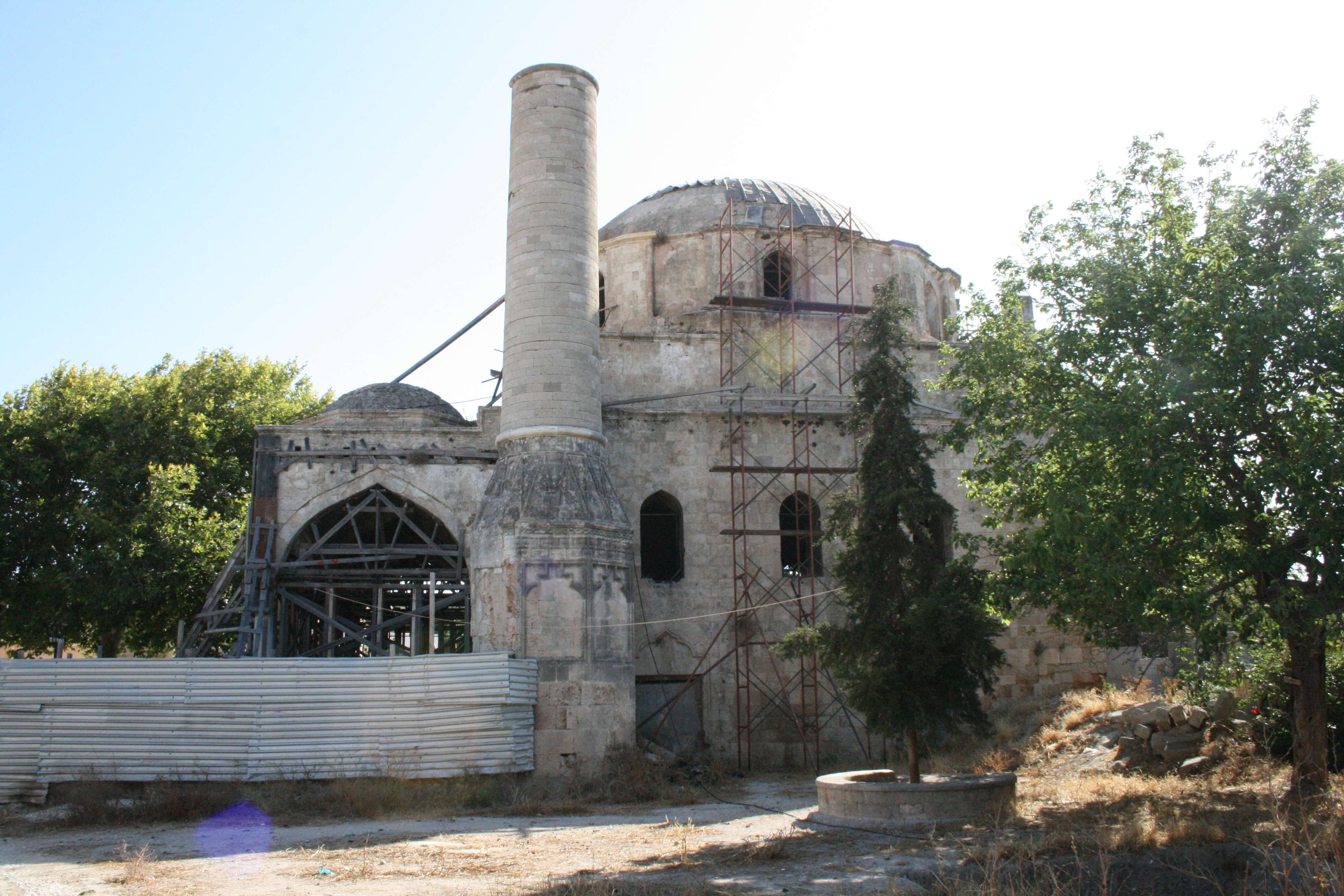
Recep Pasha mosque in 2007

Rhodes fell to the Ottoman Turks in 1522, whereupon several mosques were built, while others were made by converting the pre-existing Christian churches of the city. The construction of the Recep Pasha mosque, located at the modern Dorieos square in the city of Rhodes, was commissioned by Reçep Pasha, a Grand Vizier of the Ottoman Empire, in 1588, as the inscription right above its entrance suggests. Two more minor constructions were developed next to the mosque, the mausoleum for Reçep Pasha, situated within the mosque’s courtyard, which contains his sarcophagus, and a ablution fountain.

Left neglected for years to an almost ruinous state, part of the portico of the mosque collapsed in 2011. The cost of repair was estimated at three million euros, which was deemed too expensive, and repair works were halted on account of lack of resources. A budget of one million was approved.

There have been suggestions and calls that, once restored, the mosque should host a museum of Islamic art.

== Architecture ==
The complex of the Recep Pasha mosque—mosque, fountain and mausoleum–was built in the imperial style of the Ottoman golden age, perhaps by an architect from the school of master architect Mimar Sinan.

On the exterior, as viewed sideways, there are three levels of cornice-lines, each defined with simple moulding; the windows are articulated with carved arches, ornate at the lower levels but sober at the top around the dome; the subtle passage from (the 16-sided) drum to circular dome is made manifest by a running polygonal cornice around its crown. More elaborate decoration is only found at the base of the now collapsed minaret and around the central door.

The surface decorations of the interior of the mosque include Iznik tile panels of the 16th century bearing Quranic verses in fine calligraphy. There are also painted panels of floral decoration above the windows in the colours and motifs of Iznik ware. The building incorporates monolithic columns from earlier Christian structures. Above the door is the dedicatory inscription of Recep Pasha, expressing the justified wish that the space ‘may inspire an uplifting of the spirit’.

The octagonal ritual fountain located to the west of the mosque has survived in good condition: covered in wild vegetation, to the east side, is the turbe or mausoleum of Recep Pasha— its windows embellished with the interlocking voussoirs typical of high, Ottoman architecture.

Despite the extremely poor state it is in, it has been described as the most beautiful and architecturally impressive of the mosques in Rhodes.

== See also ==
- Ibrahim Pasha Mosque, Rhodes
- Defterdar Mosque (Kos)
- List of mosques in Greece
