= Banya Bashi Mosque =

Mosque in Sofia, Bulgaria

- Баня Баши джамия
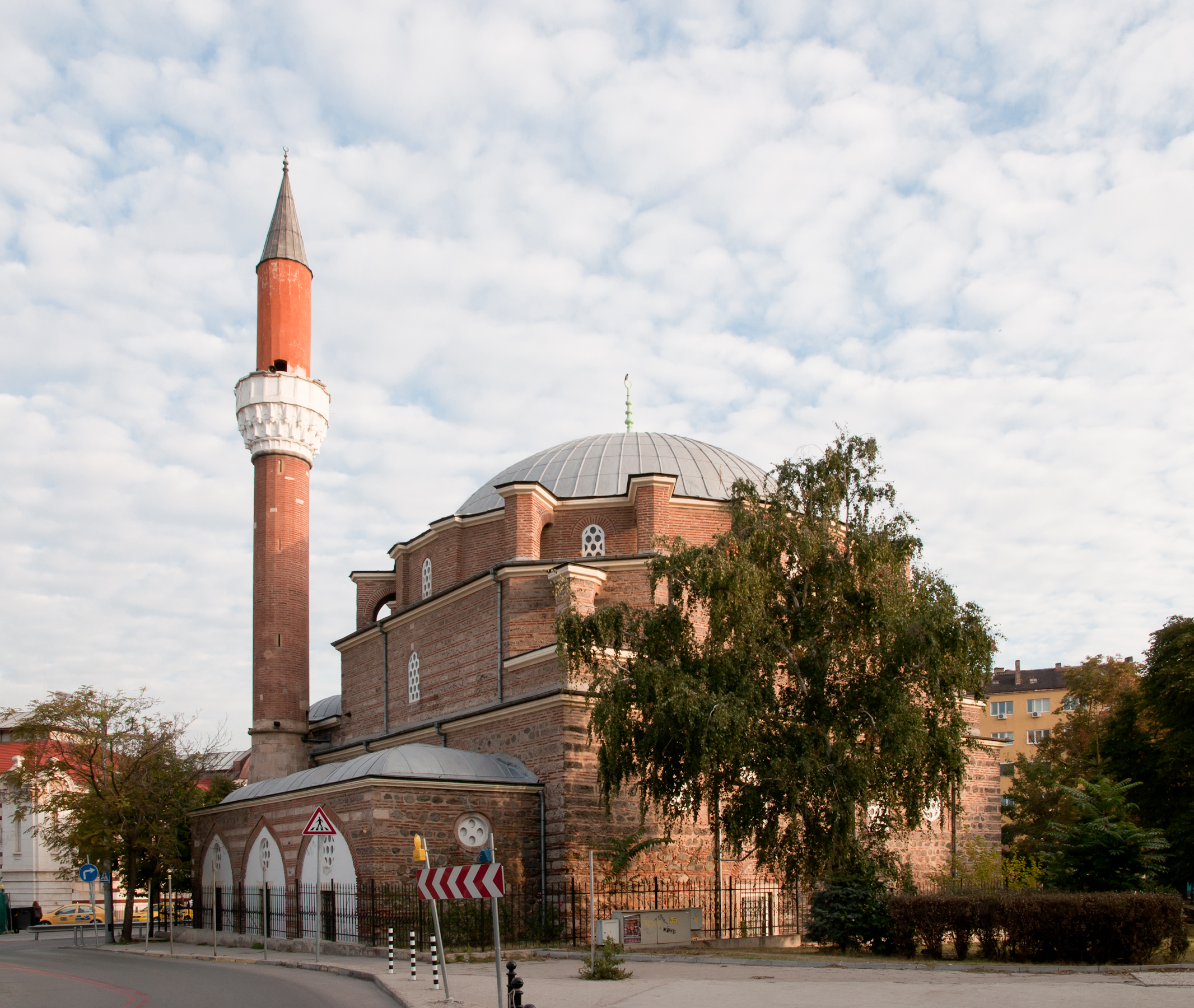

- Location within Sofia

Religion
- Affiliation: Sunni Islam
- Ecclesiastical or organizational status: Mosque
- Status: Active

Location
- Location: Sofia
- Country: Bulgaria
- Interactive map of Banya Bashi Mosque
- Coordinates: 42°41′58″N 23°19′21″E

Architecture
- Architect: Mimar Sinan
- Type: Mosque architecture
- Style: Ottoman
- Completed: 1566

Specifications
- Dome: One
- Dome dia. (inner): 15 m (49 ft)
- Minaret: One
- Materials: Brick

Banya Bashi Mosque (Bulgarian: Баня баши джамия, Banya bashi dzhamiya; Turkish: Banya Başı Camii) is a Sunni Islamic mosque in Sofia, Bulgaria.

== History ==
The mosque was designed by the famous Ottoman architect Mimar Sinan and completed in 1566, during the years the Ottomans had control of the city. The mosque derives its name from the phrase Banya Bashi, which means many baths. In the Turkish language Banyo means bath and Baş (pronounced Bash) means 'head' or 'main', so looking at the location it is built on, a more logical translation of the name would be 'Head of the bath mosque'. The most outstanding feature of the mosque is that it was actually built over natural thermal spas; one can even see the steam rising from vents in the ground near the mosque walls. The mosque is famous for its large 15 m-diameter (49 ft) dome, and the minaret.

Currently, the Banya Bashi Mosque is the only functioning mosque in Sofia used by the city's Muslim community. It remains a remnant of the Ottoman rule of Bulgaria, which lasted nearly five centuries.

On 21 May 2011, the mosque was stage of the Banya Bashi Mosque clashes between the Muslims and the Far-right party Ataka.

== Gallery ==
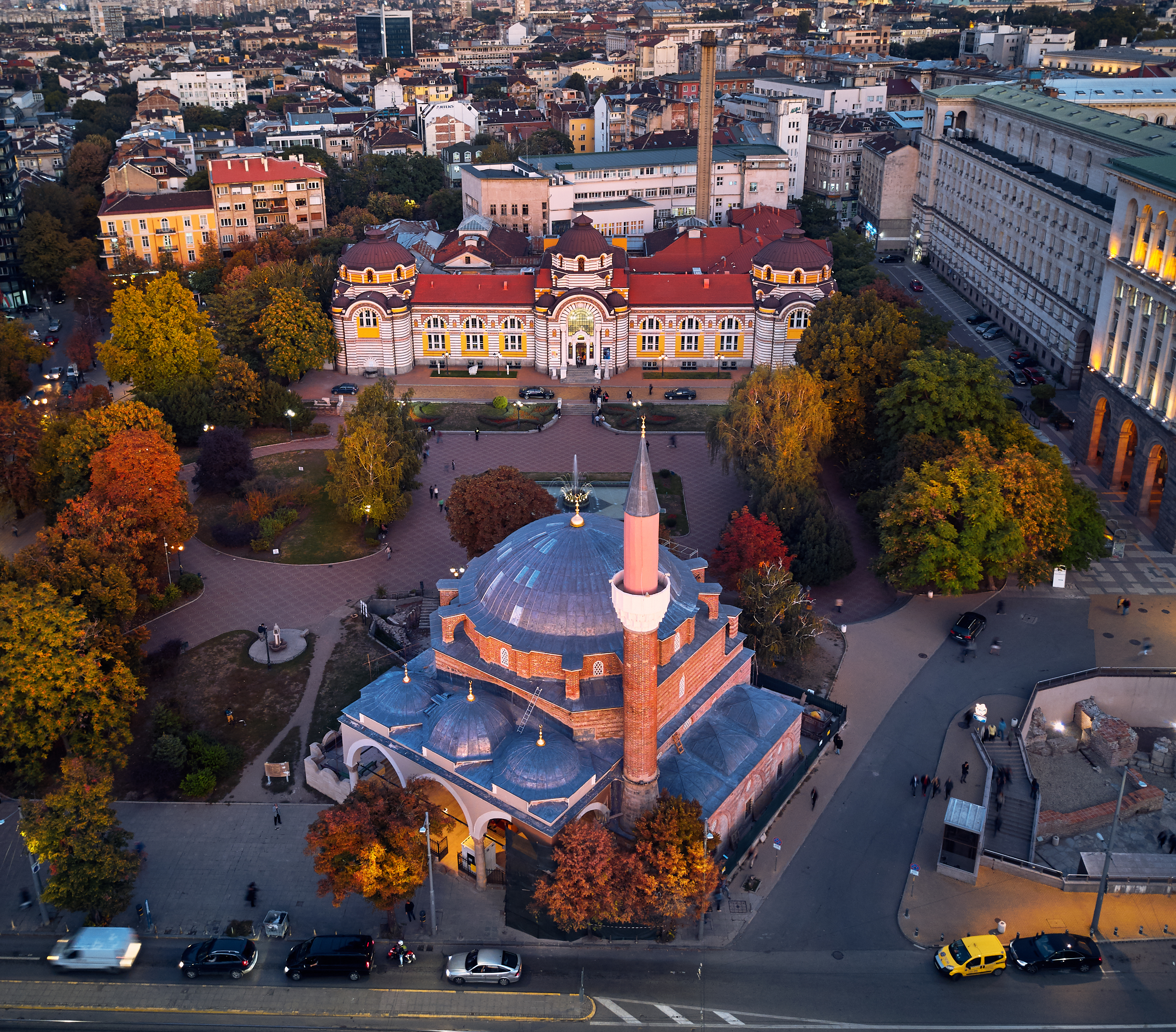
Banya Bashi Mosque from the west

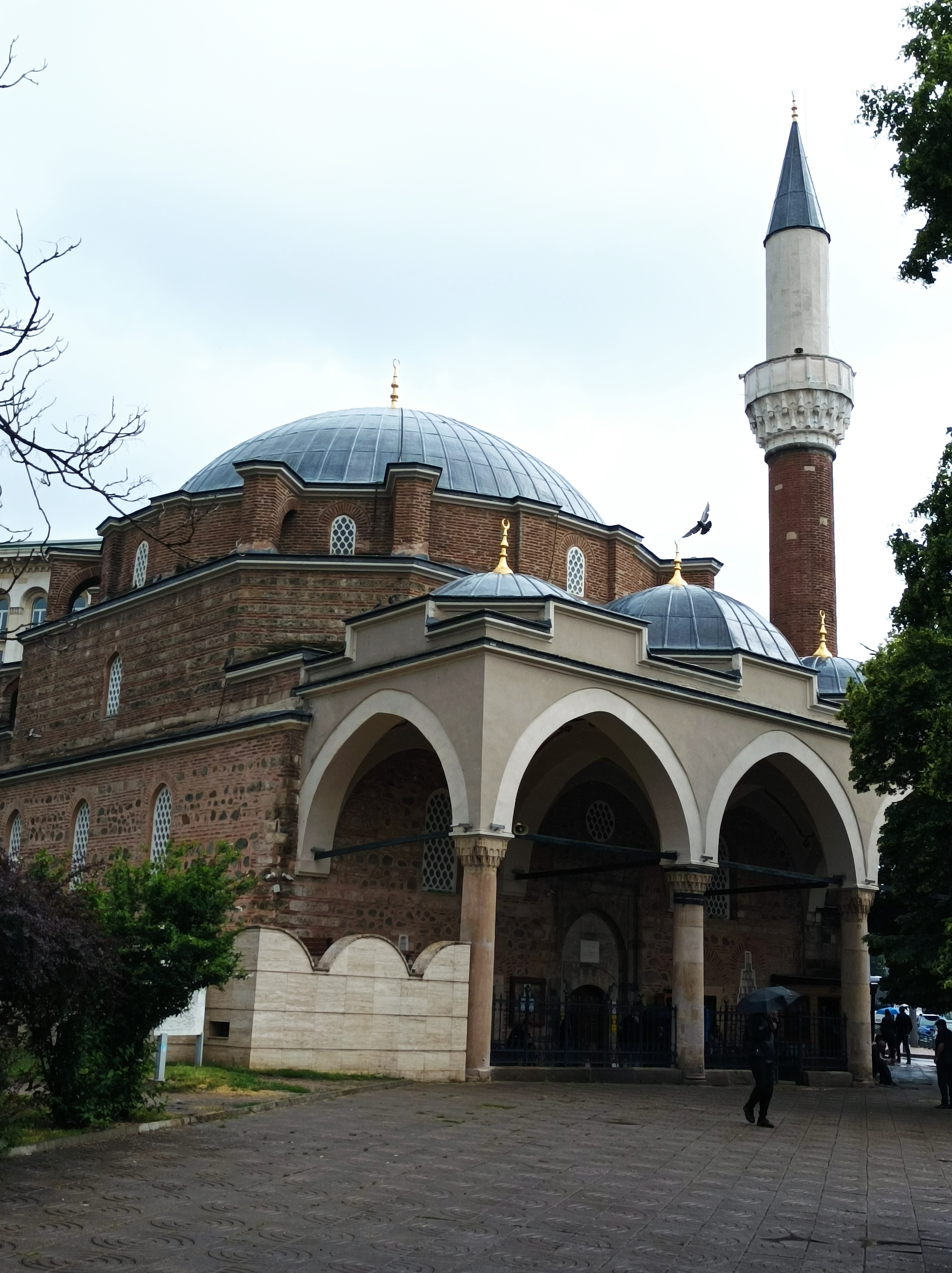
Banya Bashi Mosque north side

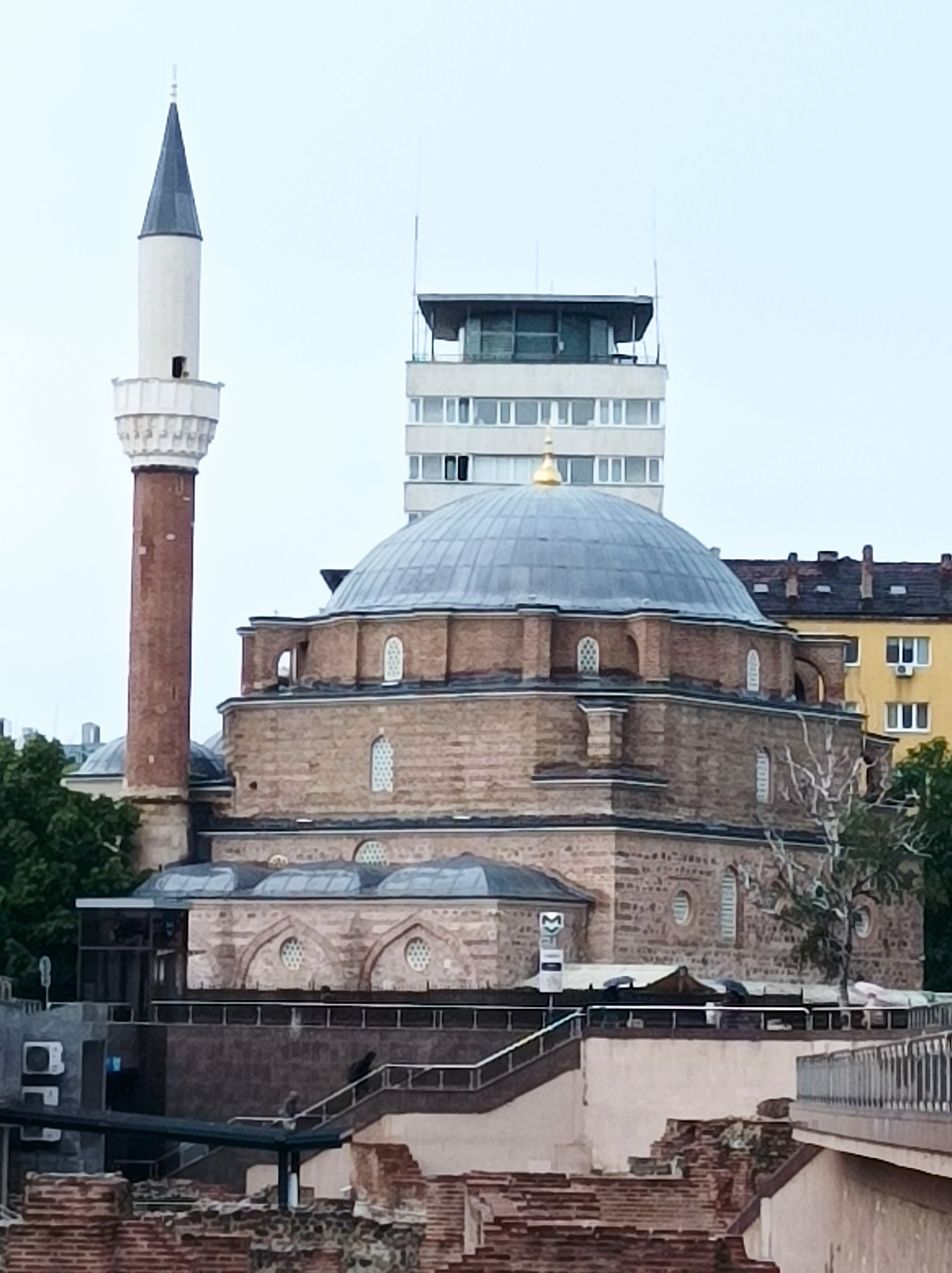
Banya Bashi Mosque south side

== See also ==
- Islam in Bulgaria
- List of mosques in Bulgaria
- Turks in Bulgaria
