= Volen Siderov =

Bulgarian politician

- Волен Сидеров
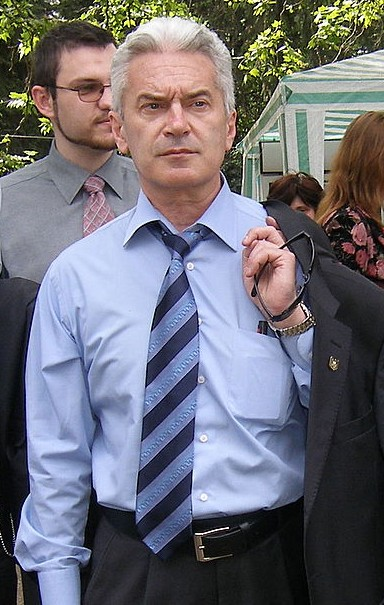
- Siderov in 2007

Member of the National Assembly
- In office 13 July 2005 – 30 October 2019
- Constituency: 25th MMC - Sofia (2005–2009); 2nd MMC - Burgas (2009–2013); 25th MMC - Sofia (2013–2017); 31st MMC - Yambol (2017–2019)
Other offices held
Member of the Sofia City Council
In office 12 November 2019 – 30 July 2021
Leader of Attack
Incumbent
Assumed office 17 April 2005
Preceded by	Position established

Personal details
- Born: Volen Nikolov Siderov; 19 April 1956 (age 70) Yambol, PR Bulgaria
- Party: Attack
- Other political affiliations: Union of Democratic Forces (until 2000)
- Spouses: Kapka Georgieva (m. 2006; div. 2011) Denitsa Gadzheva (m. 2016)
- Children: 1
- Occupation: Politician; author; journalist

Volen Nikolov Siderov (Bulgarian: Волен Николов Сидеров [ˈvɔlɛn ˈsidɛrof]; born 19 April 1956) is a Bulgarian far-right politician and chairman of the nationalist party Attack. He has been the editor of numerous newspapers and has authored five books.

In 2021, the European Court of Human Rights ruled that Bulgarian courts had erred in not upholding civil discrimination claims against Siderov for his anti-Jewish and anti-Romani statements.

== Early life ==
Siderov was born in 1956 in Yambol, Bulgaria. He received an undergraduate degree in Applied Photography in Sofia, and before the fall of Communism in 1989, worked at the National Literature Museum as a photographer. His brother, Plamen Siderov, was a mathematician and lectured at Sofia University.

After the fall of Communism, Siderov became a member of the newly established Movement for Human Rights. During the fall of 1990, he became the editor-in-chief of Democracy (Bulgarian: Демокрация), the official newspaper of the Union of Democratic Forces (Siderov played a major role in establishing the paper as the official publication of the right-wing party).

At one point he was appointed deputy editor-in-chief of Monitor, a newspaper of a political orientation that could be described as nationalist and conservative. In 2000, Siderov was presented with the award of the Union of the Bulgarian Journalists. Later, he came to be the host of Attack, a talk show on the Bulgarian cable TV channel "SKAT".

In 2002 Siderov was invited to a controversial anti-globalisation conference in Moscow where he associated with people like Ahmed Rami and David Duke.

== Rise in politics ==
During the 2003 local elections Siderov ran for mayor of Sofia on the ticket of the marginal National Association-BZNS Party. He received 1,728 votes, or 0.45%. That attempt passed largely unnoticed for the general public.

During the June 2005 parliamentary elections, already a popular TV host, Siderov organised and led the party "Attack", named after his talk show. The party won 8.14% (296,848 votes) of the total vote, thus becoming the 4th largest party in parliament. In the 2009 elections Attack won 9.4% (395,000 votes) of the total vote.

== International relations ==
Siderov reportedly espouses anti-Masonic conspiracy theories, claiming that Masons control the world through puppet regimes, international organizations, and the press. According to Siderov, these forces seek to commit genocide against Bulgarian people. Attack opposes the membership of Bulgaria in NATO; Siderov has declared that the people were lied to, that Bulgaria would be the safest place by then Bulgarian Minister of Foreign Affairs—Solomon Pasi—but the result was reducing the Bulgarian army to 20,000 troops and in necessity Bulgaria would be defenseless as the Turkish government wants. He compared the accession of Bulgaria to NATO as a new signing of the Treaty of Neuilly-sur-Seine, considered as humiliating treaty for Bulgaria, signed after World War I. Although the party is ambivalent on Bulgaria's European Union membership, it has demanded a revision of some of the previous agreements (e.g. the resolution on shutting down the Kozloduy Nuclear Power Plant near the Danube), it claims that those who signed the EU membership, referring to Meglena Kuneva and others, are national traitors, not because of the EU membership itself, but because of the "anti-Bulgarian" agreements, on which it is signed. Siderov expressed respect to the Russian president Vladimir Putin, by visiting him on foot for his 60th birthday on 7 October 2012. On 8 March 2013 Siderov paid tribute to the deceased president of Venezuela Hugo Chávez at the Bolivarian republic's embassy in Sofia, where he called the revolutionary an 'example for the Bulgarian patriots as a statesman'.

Attack insists on the cancellation of Treaty of Neuilly-sur-Seine and the returning of the Western Outlands to Bulgaria, annexed by Yugoslavia after the First World War, which consists of the regions of Dimitrovgrad and Bosilegrad in Serbia, whose population according to the Serbian national census is predominantly ethnic Bulgarian, and of the region of Strumica in North Macedonia. Siderov said that the treaty is invalid, because it was signed with Yugoslavia in 1919, a vanished state, and does not refer to the present-day Serbia or to North Macedonia and should be cancelled.

The first statement ever of Volen Siderov from the parliamentary tribune, for a plan for a giant genocide of the Bulgarian nation, coming from abroad:

…In this 8-year period gigantic genocide was carried out over the Bulgarian nation. At the insistence of foreign, hostile to Bulgaria factors, of our people is projected to remain 3.5 to 4 million residents. This is Bulgarophobe's plan and this plan is realised in front of us. If someone asks how, I will show him: when the right of the Bulgarians to be masters in their own country became stolen, when they will be left to die in misery and lack of medicines and medical services, by being subjected to terror by Gypsy bands, who everyday [sic?] disrupt, rob, rape and maltreat the Bulgarian nation, after which nobody deliberately seeks out the crimes, committed by them, because this is the directive outside, not to investigate the crimes of these minority groups. The goal is for the Bulgarians to live in fear, to be discouraged, crushed, submissive. Hundreds of thousands of chronically ill are dying right now because mob companies of the previous cabinet make dirty deals with the life and health of the Bulgarians. Because relatives of the previous Minister of Environment are trading with medicaments for cancer and therefore there are not any medicaments, and hundreds of thousands of Bulgarians with cancer face a slow, excruciating agony.

In September 2018, Siderov met with Israeli MK Oren Hazan, a member of the Likud party, during the latter's visit to Bulgaria. Hazan defended the meeting by noting that Siderov "said he apologized for what he had said" about the Holocaust in the past, and Hazan then "told him he needed to do it publicly".

== Controversy ==
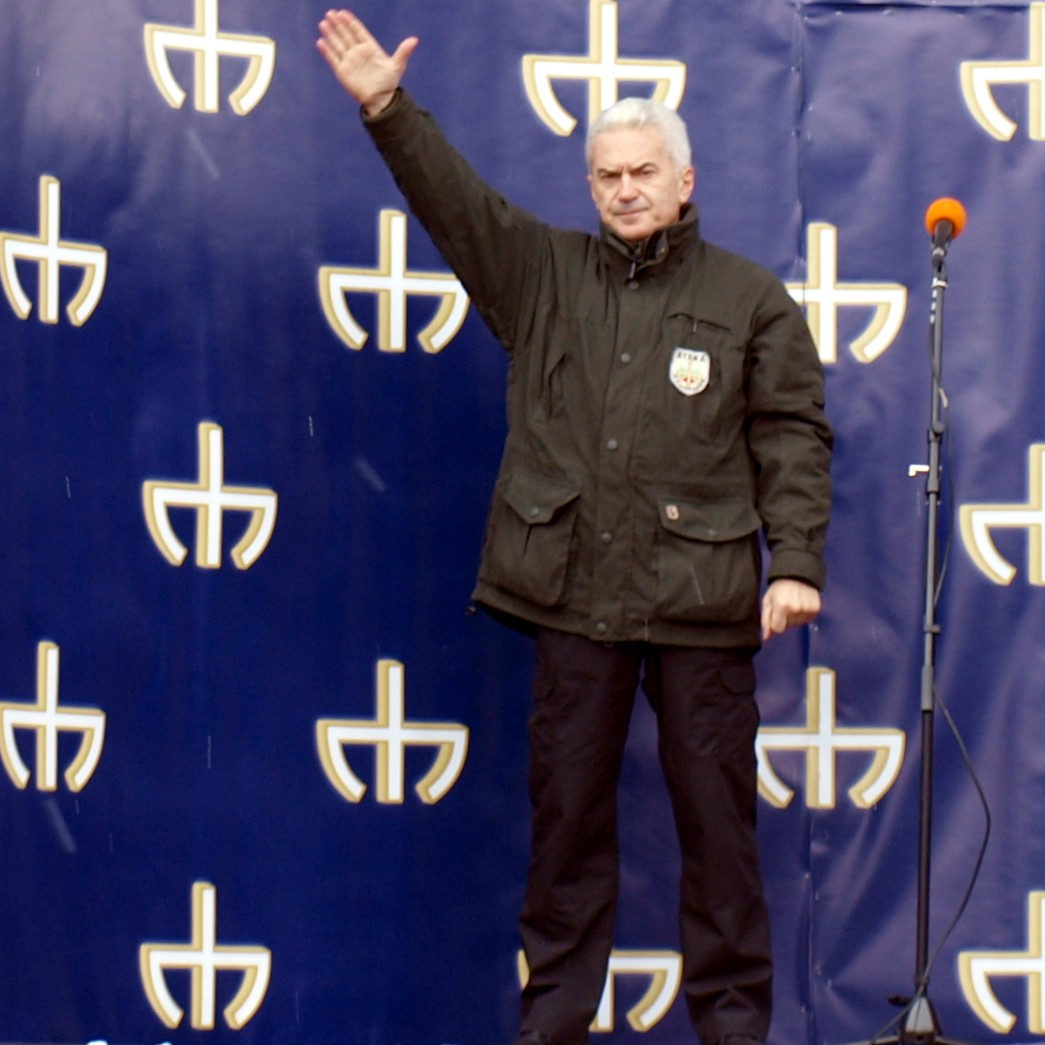
Volen Siderov at a National Union Attack rally

Siderov has generated increasing controversy as Attack has improved at the polls. He has been labeled xenophobic, and his persona has been called "a studied imitation of Hitler". He has criticised the "symbiotic relationship" between established political parties and organised criminal groups. He has also spoken against the widespread discrimination against majority ethnic Bulgarians by their own state, particularly in relation to the alleged non-prosecution by the state of crimes committed by ethnic minorities and the free provision to certain ethnic groups of social services that have been denied to ordinary Bulgarians.

Siderov and his party "Attack" were among the few Bulgarian political forces that opposed the closing of the four units of the Kozloduy Nuclear Power Plant. Units 1 and 2 were taken shut down in the end of 2003 and units 3 and 4 were taken out of operation in the final hours of 2006, immediately prior to the country's accession to the European Union.

From time to time Siderov is involved in scandals that include hooliganism.

During a televised debate in the show Referendum on Bulgarian National Television (BNT), after arriving late, Siderov questioned the sexual orientation of IMRO leader Angel Dzhambazki, as well as Krasimir Karakachanov's property deals and alluded to what he alleged was underhanded support by the Movement for Rights and Freedoms for the nationalist IMRO party. He continued to speak even after being told to stop by moderators and even after his microphone was turned off. Gendarmerie officers arrived on scene to escort Siderov out of the studio and he was subsequently banned from appearing on the BNT by the channel's management. Bulgaria's council for electronic media referred the case to the country's Central Electoral Commission in an attempt to revoke Siderov's right to access free media packages, which are given to parties in the run-up to elections. Siderov reacted to these actions by accusing the network of censorship.

Siderov has questioned the lethality of COVID-19. He has also been under legal investigation for encouraging citizens to violate the pandemic control measures.

== Presidential election 2006 ==
Siderov ran for President in the 2006 presidential election. In the first round on 22 October he received 21% of the vote and qualified for the runoff on 29 October against incumbent Georgi Parvanov, who had 65%. Parvanov was not declared the winner after the first round because, in accordance with Bulgarian electoral law, at least 50% of all registered voters had to take part in the first round for that. Mainstream right-wing parties in Bulgaria (the UDF and the DSB) refused to back any of the candidates, despite appeals by many observers, notably by fellow conservative and European People's Party chairman Hans-Gert Pöttering, to support Parvanov (the situation was commonly compared with the way French left voters supported mainstream right-wing candidate Jacques Chirac against far-right Jean-Marie Le Pen in 2002). The centrist National Movement for Simeon II ultimately decided to back Parvanov. Meanwhile, some far-left formations called their sympathizers to support Siderov. In the second round, he lost, receiving about 24% of the vote.

== 2019 Sofia mayoral run ==
In September 2019, Siderov announced his resignation from Bulgaria's National Assembly, in order to run for the post of mayor of Sofia, Bulgaria's capital and largest city, in the 2019 Bulgarian local elections.

During his election campaign he promised that, if elected, he would stop the use of municipal tow trucks for forcefully moving incorrectly parked cars, as well as ban any gay parades, such as Sofia Pride, from being held in the city. Siderov claimed that homosexuality itself "did not interest" him and that homosexuals could have a private party instead, as he deemed the gay parade was only costing the Sofia Municipality excess money, as the local police is charged with guarding the event. He also stated that he would attempt to save money by creating a local, municipal-run construction company, which would handle public works, instead of auctioning them off to private companies. Siderov believes that with these measures, he could fund free bus passes for all retirees and schoolkids in Sofia. He further pledged to "crush" street gangs and organized crime in Sofia in only 3 months, stating that voters were free to "have his head" if he did not fulfill this promise in time. Adding that he thought Sofia needed its own Viktor Orbán, he further stated that he believed candidates for mayor should resign their previous posts before standing for election, as he had done with his position in the national assembly. For this reason, he praised Maya Manolova, who resigned from her position as National Ombudsman to run for Mayor of Sofia, but criticised Angel Dzhambazki, another candidate for the position, who refused to give up his seat in the European Parliament.

During the vote counting process, he arrived at Arena Armeec, where the votes were being tallied, and insisted he be allowed in to monitor the process. He was denied entry by the policemen guarding the arena and left after a long argument with the authorities, which told him that Bulgarian electoral law makes no provision for political candidates to monitor the counting process. He finished seventh with 1.44% of the vote.

== Personal life ==
Siderov's hobby is collecting books and various maps related to Bulgaria.

== Selected works ==
- Siderov, Volen (2002) Бумерангът на злото (The Boomerang of evil). Sofia: Жарава.
- Siderov, Volen (2004) Властта на Мамона. Кой и как ни ограбва (The power of the Mammon. Who and how is robbing us.). Sofia: Бумеранг, ISBN 9549330044.
- Siderov, Volen (2007) Моята битка за България (My struggle for Bulgaria). Sofia: Бумеранг, ISBN 9789549330076.

== Bibliography ==
- Lilov, Grigor (2013). Най-богатите българи (1st ed.). Sofia: "Кайлас" ЕООД. ISBN 978-954-92098-9-1.
