= Dzhumaya Mosque =

Mosque in Plovdiv, Bulgaria

- Джумая джамия
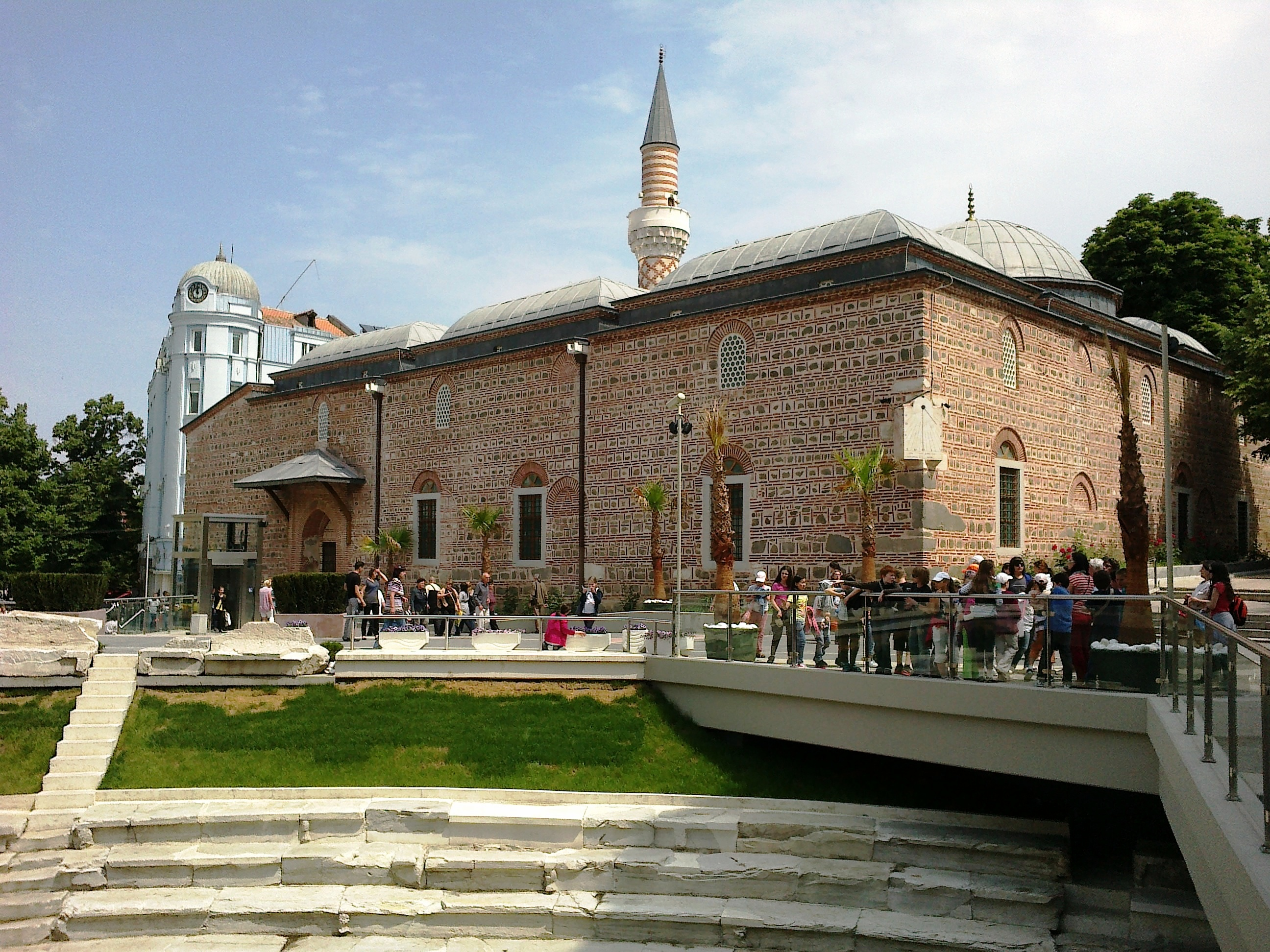

- Location within Bulgaria

Religion
- Affiliation: Islam

Location
- Location: Plovdiv, Plovdiv Province
- Country: Bulgaria
- Interactive map of Dzhumaya Mosque
- Coordinates: 42.1479°N 24.7483°E

Architecture
- Type: mosque
- Style: Ottoman-Turkish
- Completed: 1364 CE

Specifications
- Length: 33 m (108 ft)
- Width: 27 m (89 ft)
- Dome: 9
- Minaret: 1

The Dzhumaya Mosque (Bulgarian: Джумая джамия, lit. 'Ulu Dzhumaya Mosque'; Turkish: Hüdavendigâr Camii or Cuma Camii), also known as the Friday Mosque, is a mosque located in Plovdiv, in the Plovdiv Province of Bulgaria. Located in the centre of Plovdiv, the mosque was built in 1363–1364 on the site of the Sveta Petka Tarnovska Cathedral Church after the conquest of Plovdiv by the Ottoman army. During the reign of Sultan Murad I in the 15th century the old building was demolished and replaced by the modern-day mosque.

The large mosque has nine domes and a 33 m × 27 m (108 ft × 89 ft) prayer hall. A minaret is located at the northeast corner of the main façade. Interior wall paintings date from the late-18th to early-19th centuries.

== Attacks ==
The mosque was attacked by a mob described as "hundreds of nationalists, fascists and football hooligans" in February 2014. 120 were "detained" after the attack and four received minor sentences. The Grand Mufti of Bulgaria, Mustafa Haci, characterized the attack as a "pogrom."

== See also ==
- Islam in Bulgaria
- List of mosques in Bulgaria
