= Islam in Bulgaria =

Islam in Europe by percentage of country population 95–100%: Azerbaijan; 90–95%: Turkey; Kosovo; 50–70%: Albania; Bosnia and Herzegovina; Kazakhstan; 30–35%: North Macedonia; 10–20%: Russia; France; Georgia; Montenegro; 5–10%: Austria; Bulgaria; Sweden; Belgium; Germany; Liechtenstein; Netherlands; Switzerland; United Kingdom; Denmark; Luxembourg; 4–5%: Serbia; 2–4%: Italy; Finland; Norway; Malta; Slovenia; Spain; Greece; Cyprus (Note: Only takes into account the Muslim population residing on land controlled by the Republic of Cyprus.); 1–2%: Croatia; Ireland; Ukraine; Andorra; < 1%: Iceland; Armenia; Belarus; Czech Republic; Estonia; Hungary; Latvia; Lithuania; Moldova; Monaco; Poland; Portugal; Romania; San Marino; Slovakia

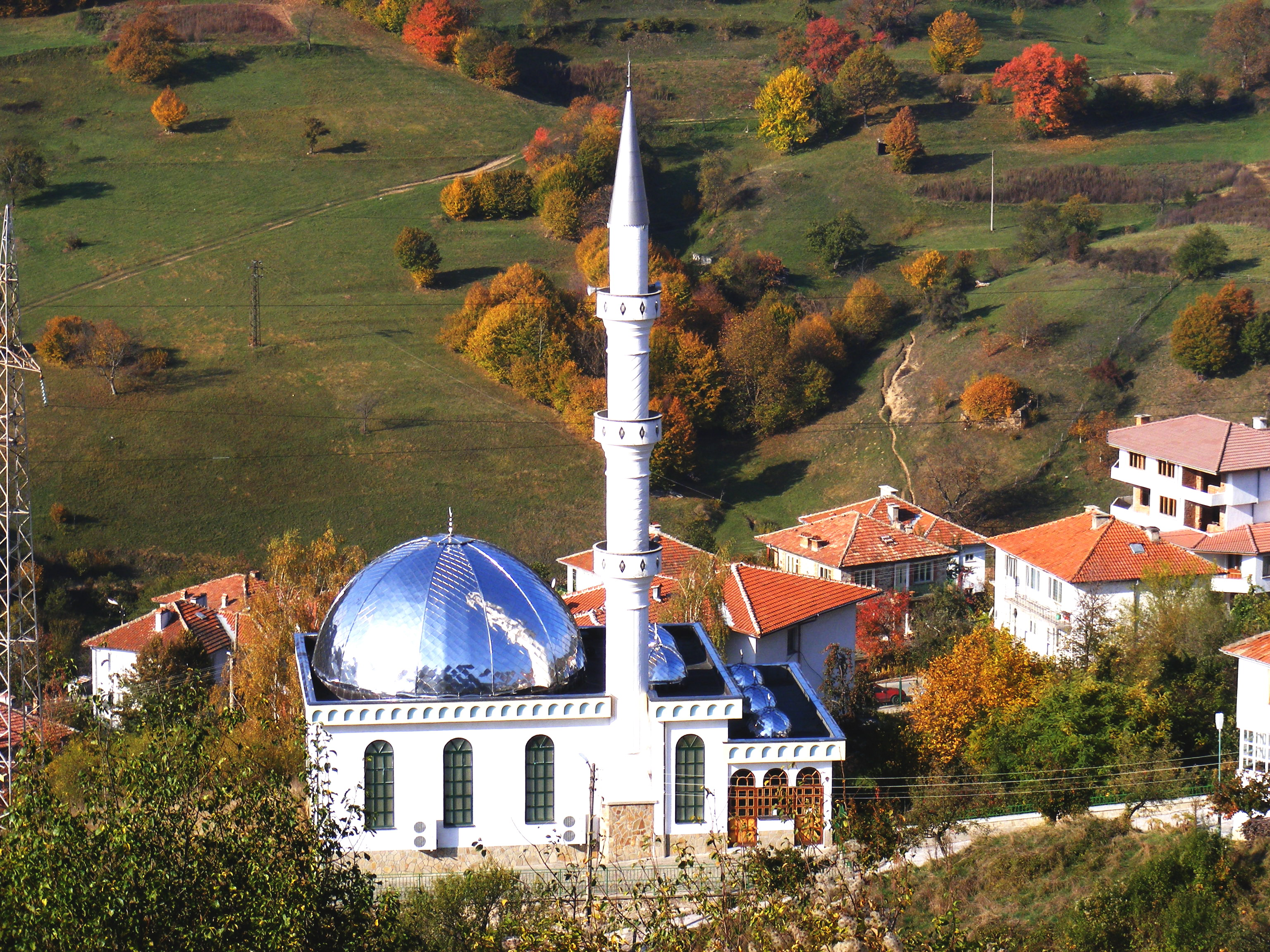
Mosque in Taran

Islam in Bulgaria is a minority religion and the second largest religion in the country after Christianity. According to the 2021 Census, the total number of Muslims in Bulgaria stood at 638,708 corresponding to 9.8% of the population. Ethnically, Muslims in Bulgaria are Turks, Bulgarians, Roma, and Tatars living mainly in parts of northeastern Bulgaria (mainly in Razgrad, Targovishte, Shumen and Silistra Provinces) and in the Rhodope Mountains (mainly in Kardzhali Province and Smolyan Province).

== History ==
Historical population
Year	Pop.	±%
1881	578,060	—
1887	676,215	+17.0%
1892	643,258	−4.9%
1900	643,300	+0.0%
1910	602,078	−6.4%
1920	690,734	+14.7%
1926	789,296	+14.3%
1934	821,298	+4.1%
1946	938,418	+14.3%
1992	1,110,295	+18.3%
2001	966,978	−12.9%
2011	577,139	−40.3%
2021	638,708	+10.7%
At the 2011 census answering the question for religion was not obligatory. Source: NSI 1881

=== Contact with Islam prior to the Ottoman conquest ===
The first documented Bulgarian contact with the Muslim world was in the early 700s, when Khan Tervel of Bulgaria helped the Byzantines break the Arab siege of Constantinople, after his army reportedly slaid some 22,000 enemy soldiers. Two centuries afterwards, enmity turned into mutual collaboration, as Bulgaria under Tsar Simeon I and the Arabs coordinated their attacks on the Byzantine Empire multiple times. During the same period, Bulgarian art started exhibiting some Islamic influence, probably mediated by the Byzantines.

Later on, in the mid 1200s, a group of Seljuk Turks is thought to have settled in North Dobruja. According to Ibn Battuta and Evliya Çelebi, the Turkomans colonised the Black Sea coast between the Bulgarian border and Babadag further north. Eventually, part of them returned to Anatolia, while the rest adopted Christianity and are thought to be probable ancestors of the modern Gagauz. However, there is debate whether this settlement ever really happened, as some scholars believe it to have the characteristics of a folk legend.

Scholarly consensus holds that the first significant Muslim communities on the Balkan Peninsula appeared in the late fourteenth century, as the peninsula gradually fell under Ottoman rule.

=== Ottoman rule (1396–1878) ===
The Ottoman Empire conquered the last independent piece of the Second Bulgarian Empire, the Tsardom of Vidin, in 1396 (or, as some historians hypothesise, in 1422), and Bulgaria remained under Ottoman and Islamic rule for almost five centuries. Christians in the Ottoman Empire were treated as second-class citizens, i.e., as dhimmis. They were often called giaour, meaning "infidel" as an offensive term. Most of the conquered land was parcelled out to the Sultan's followers, who held it as benefices or fiefs (small ones timar, medium ones zeamet and large ones hass). The system was meant to make the army self-sufficient and to continuously increase the number of Ottoman cavalry soldiers, thus both fueling new conquests and bringing conquered countries under direct Ottoman control.

Christians paid disproportionately higher taxes than Muslims, including the poll tax, jizye, in lieu of military service. According to İnalcık, jizye was the single most important source of income (48 per cent) to the Ottoman budget, with Rumelia accounting for 81 per cent of the revenues. However, by the early 1600, almost all land had been divided into estates (arpalik) granted to senior Ottoman dignitaries as a form of tax farming, which created conditions for severe exploitation of taxpayers by unscrupulous land holders. According to Radishev, overtaxation became a particularly poignant issue after jizye collection in most of the country was taken over by the Six Divisions of Cavalry.

Bulgarians also paid a number of other taxes, including a tithe ("yushur"), a land tax ("ispench"), a levy on commerce, and various irregularly collected taxes, products and corvees ("avariz"). As a rule, the overall tax burden of the rayah (i.e., Non-Muslims), was twice as high as that of Muslims.

Christians faced a number of other restrictions: they were barred from testifying against Muslims in inter-faith legal disputes. Even though they were free to perform their own religious rituals, this had to be done in a manner that was inconscpicuous to Muslims, i.e., loud prayers or bell ringing were forbidden. They were not permitted to build or repair churches without Muslim consent. They were barred from certain professions, from riding horses, from wearing certain colours or from carrying weapons. Their houses and churches could not be taller than Muslim ones.

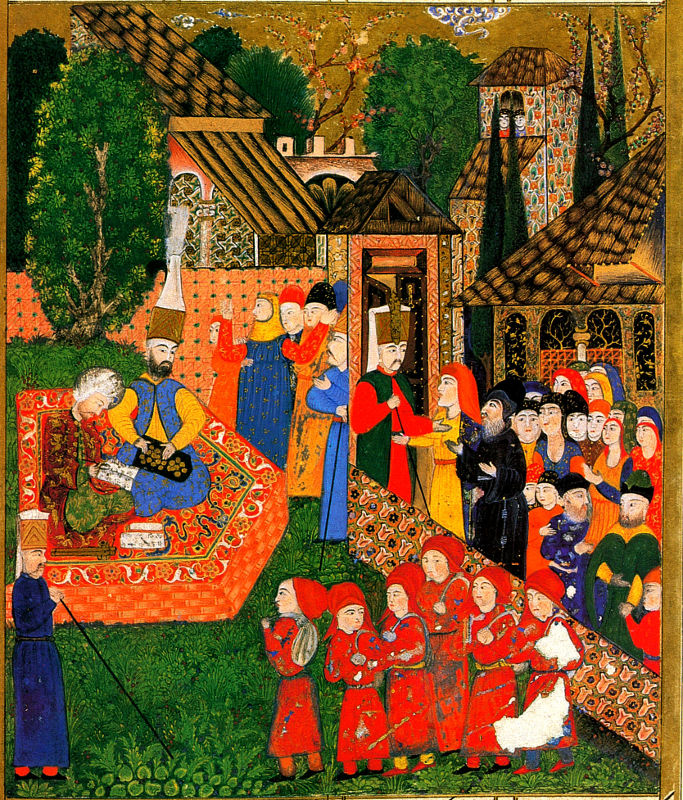
Illustration of an Ottoman official and his assistant registering Christian boys for the devshirme. The official takes a tax to cover the price of the boys' new red clothes and the cost of transport from their home, while the assistant records their village, district and province, parentage, date of birth and physical appearance. Ottoman miniature painting, 1558.

Nevertheless, there were specific categories of rayah who were exempt from nearly all such restrictions, such as the Dervendjis, who guarded important passes, roads, bridges, etc., ore-mining centres such as Chiprovtsi, etc. Some of the most important Bulgarian culutural and economic centres in the 19th century owe their development to a former dervendji status, for example, Gabrovo, Dryanovo, Kalofer, Panagyurishte, Kotel, Zheravna. Similarly, Christians living on wakf holdings were subject to lower tax burden and fewer restrictions.

Probably the worst practice Christian Bulgarians were subjected to was the devşirme, or blood tax, where the healthiest and brightest Christian boys were taken from their families, enslaved in slavery in the Ottoman Empire, converted to Islam and later employed either in the Janissary military corps or the Ottoman administrative system. The boys were picked from one in forty households. They had to be unmarried and, once taken, were ordered to cut all ties with their family. Christian parents resented the forced recruitment of their children, and would beg and seek to buy their children out of the levy. Sources mention different ways to avoid the devshirme such as: marrying the boys at the age of 12, mutilating them or having both father and son convert to Islam. In 1565, the practice led to a revolt in Albania and Epirus, where the inhabitants killed the recruiting officials.

=== Conquest and conversion to Islam ===
Islam in Bulgaria spread through both the conquest by Muslims from Asia Minor and conversion of native Bulgarians. The Ottomans' mass population transfers began in the late 1300s and continued well into the 1500s. The first community settled in present-day Bulgaria was made up of Tatars who willingly arrived to begin a settled life as farmers, the second one a tribe of nomads that had run afoul of the Ottoman administration. Both groups settled in the Upper Thracian Plain, in the vicinity of Plovdiv. Another large group of Tatars was moved by Mehmed I to Thrace in 1418, followed by the relocation of more than 1000 Turkoman families to Northeastern Bulgaria in the 1490s. At the same time, there are records of at least two forced relocations of Bulgarians to Anatolia, one right after the fall of Veliko Tarnovo and a second one to İzmir in the mid-1400s. The goal of this "mixing of peoples" was to quell any unrest in the conquered Balkan states, while simultaneously getting rid of troublemakers in the Ottoman backyard in Anatolia.

Nevertheless, the Ottomans never pursued or practiced forced Islamisation of the Bulgarian population, as had earlier been claimed by Communist Bulgarian historiography. According to scholarly consensus, conversion to Islam was voluntary as it offered Bulgarians religious and economic benefits. Missionary activities of the dervish orders resulted in mass conversions to Islam; though many converts retained Christian practices such as baptism, celebration of Christian holidays etc. Muslim population in Bulgaria was a combination of indigenous converts to Islam, and Muslims originating outside the Balkans. Most urban areas gradually became Muslim majority, whereas rural areas remained overwhelmingly Christian. However, in some cases, adopting Islam can be said to be the result of tax coercion. While some authors have argued that other factors, such as desire to retain social status, were of greater importance, Turkish writer Halil İnalcık has referred to the desire to stop paying jizya as a primary incentive for conversion to Islam in the Balkans, and Bulgarian Anton Minkov has argued that it was one among several motivating factors.

Two large-scale studies of the causes of adoption of Islam in Bulgaria, one of the Chepino Valley by Dutch Ottomanist Machiel Kiel, and another one of the region of Gotse Delchev in the Western Rhodopes by Evgeni Radushev, reveal a complex set of factors behind the process. These include: pre-existing high population density owing to the late inclusion of the two mountainous regions in the Ottoman system of taxation; immigration of Christian Bulgarians from lowland regions to avoid taxation throughout the 1400s; the relative poverty of the regions; early introduction of local Christian Bulgarians to Islam through contacts with nomadic Yörüks; the nearly constant Ottoman conflict with the Habsburgs from the mid-1500s to the early 1700s; the resulting massive war expenses that led to a sixfold increase in the jizya rate from 1574 to 1691 and the imposition of a war-time avariz tax; the Little Ice Age in the 1600s that caused crop failures and widespread famine; heavy corruption and overtaxation by local landholders—all of which led to a slow, but steady process of Islamisation until the mid-1600s when the tax burden becomes so unbearable that most of the remaining Christians either converted en masse or left for lowland areas.

As a result of these factors, the population of Ottoman Bulgaria is presumed to have dropped twofold from a peak of approx. 1.8 million (1.2 million Christians and 0.6 million Muslims) in the 1580s to approx. 0.9 million in the 1680s (450,000 Christians and 450,000 Muslims) after growing steadily from a base of approx. 600,000 (450,000 Christians and 150,000 Muslims) in the 1450s.

The Ottoman Empire's greatest advantage compared to other colonial powers, the millet system and the autonomy each denomination had within legal, confessional, cultural and family matters, nevertheless, largely did not apply to Bulgarians and most other Orthodox peoples on the Balkans, as the independent Bulgarian Patriarchate was abolished, and all Bulgarian Orthodox dioceses were subjected to the rule of the Ecumenical Patriarch in Constantinople. Thus, instead of helping Christian Bulgarians maintain their customs and cultural identity, the millet system actually promoted their annihilation. Bulgarian ceased to be a literary language, the higher clergy was invariable Greek, and the Phanariotes started making persistent efforts to hellenise Bulgarians as early as the early 1700s. It was only after the struggle for church autonomy in the mid-1800s and especially after the Bulgarian Exarchate was established by a firman of Sultan Abdülaziz in 1870 that this mistake was corrected.

=== Post-Independence (1878) ===
Following the Russo-Turkish War and the 1878 Treaty of Berlin, five sanjaks of the Ottoman Danube Vilayet—Vidin, Veliko Tarnovo, Ruse, Sofia and Varna—were united into the autonomous Principality of Bulgaria, putting Bulgaria again on the political map of Europe after five centuries. According to the 1875 Ottoman salname, the pre-war Muslim populations of the Principality stood at 405,450 males, or a total of 810,910 people, and accounted for 39.2% of the Principality's population. Most of the Muslims were so-called "Established Muslims", i.e., Turks and Pomaks, but there were also substantial minorities of Circassian and Tatar Muhacir and Romani.

As a rule, Bulgarian governments after 1878 worked to ensure the freedom of conscience and worship of all non-Bulgarian and non-Christian citizens. Thus, Muslims retained the right to administer their schools and houses of worship and kept considerable autonomy in intraconfessional matters such as marriage, divorce and inheritance. Muslims fought in the Serbo-Bulgarian War of 1885 (and all of Bulgaria's subsequent wars except for the Balkan wars and earned widespread respect as well as a high number of medals for bravery in action). Even though there were no ethnic Turkish or Muslim parties, every single national assembly until Bulgaria's occupation by the Soviet Union in 1944 had Turkish and Muslim MPs. Mosques and imams were funded by the state budget.

The Principality expanded somewhat after the Balkan Wars when the largely-Muslim Rhodopes and Western Thrace regions were incorporated into the country. The First Balkan War was accompanied by forced Christianization of Muslim Bulgarians settlements. The atrocious act was repealed immediately by the new government elected after the loss of the Second Balkan War.

Like the practitioners of other beliefs including Orthodox Christians, Muslims suffered under the restriction of religious freedom by the Marxist-Leninist Zhivkov regime which instituted state atheism and suppressed religious communities. The Bulgarian communist regimes declared Islam and other religions to be "opium of the people." In 1989, 310,000 to 360,000 people fled to Turkey as a result of the communist Zhivkov regime's assimilation campaign; however, 154,937 of them returned in the months after the fall of Zhivkov's regime in November 1989. The program, which began in 1984, forced all Turks and other Muslims in Bulgaria to adopt Bulgarian names and renounce all Muslim customs. The motivation of the 1984 assimilation campaign was unclear; however, many experts believed that the disproportion between the birth rates of the Turks and the Bulgarians was a major factor. The event became known as "the revival process" or "the renaming." According to Bulgarian historian and human rights activist Antonina Zhelyazkova, additional 30,000 to 60,000 Muslims emigrated to Turkey between 1990 and 1996 because of the prolonged economic crisis in Bulgaria.

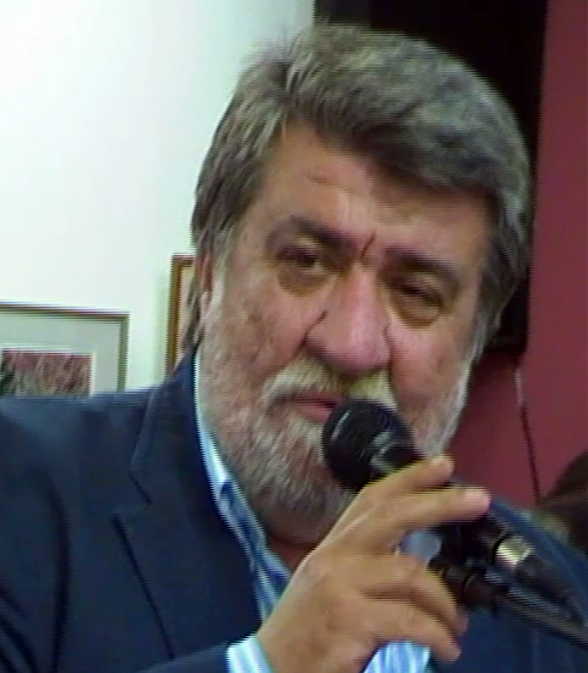
The Speaker of the 48th National Assembly, Vezhdi Rashidov

Muslims in Bulgaria have enjoyed greater religious freedom after the fall of the Zhivkov regime. New mosques have been built in many cities and villages; one village built a new church and a new mosque side by side. Some villages organized Quran study courses for young people (study of the Quran had been completely forbidden under Zhivkov). Muslims also began publishing their own newspaper, Miusiulmani, in both Bulgarian and Turkish. In 2022, sculptor Vezhdi Rashidov was elected Speaker of the 48th National Assembly, the highest official position ever held by a Muslim in Bulgaria.

== Demographics ==
According to the 2021 census, there were 638,708 Muslims in Bulgaria, who accounted for 9.8% of the population of the country. According to 2014 estimates, almost one million Muslims live in Bulgaria, forming the largest Muslim minority in any EU country (percentage-wise, not in absolute numbers). According to a 2017 survey by the Pew Research Center, 15% of Bulgaria's population is Muslim. Almost all Muslims in Bulgaria are Bulgarian citizens.

=== Geographical distribution ===
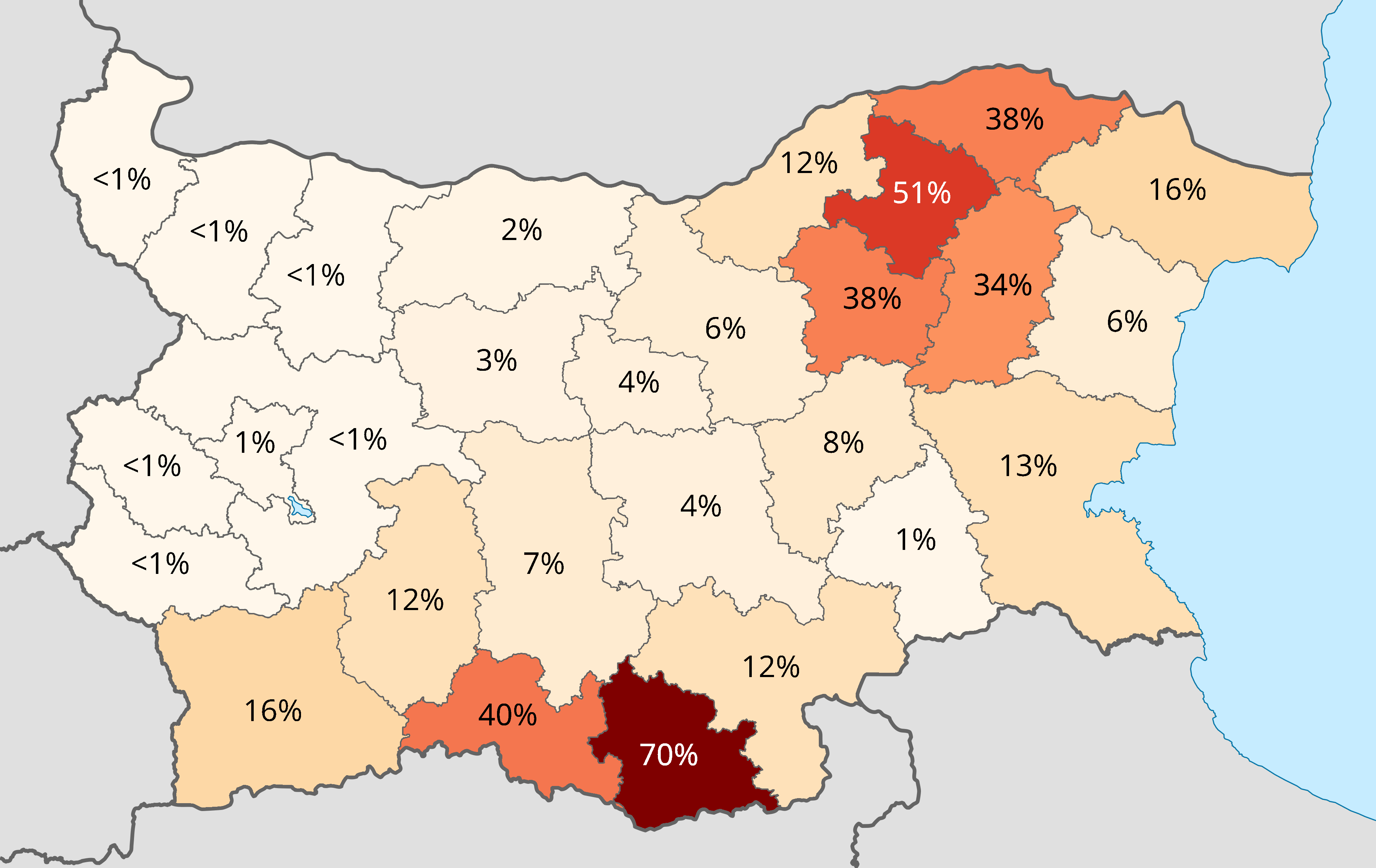
Distribution of Muslims in Bulgaria

According to the 2021 census, 40 out of a total of 266 Bulgarian municipalities had a Muslim majority and three additional municipalities had a Muslim plurality, or one more than in 2011. There were two municipalities with a Muslim population over 90 percent: the Sarnitsa Municipality with a Muslim population of 96.4% and the Chernoochene Municipality with a Muslim population of 90.8%. Practically all municipalities with a Muslim majority are small and very small and generally rural. The exception, and the only provincial capital municipality with a Muslim majority, is the Kardzhali Municipality. All municipalities with a Muslim majority or plurality are listed below.

Muslims by municipality in 2021
Municipality	Population (2021 census)	Muslims (2021 census)	% of the total population
Sarnitsa Municipality	4,732	4,561	96.4%
Chernoochene Municipality	7,775	7,059	90.8%
Dospat Municipality	7,510	6,570	87.5%
Satovcha Municipality	13,422	11,731	87.4%
Rudozem Municipality	8,674	7,270	83.8%
Ardino Municipality	11,138	9,370	82.8%
Ruen Municipality	26,385	21,753	82.4%
Kaolinovo Municipality	10,519	8,579	81.6%
Yakoruda Municipality	9,581	7,722	80.6%
Madan Municipality	10,062	7,870	78.2%
Zavet Municipality	8,049	6,189	76.9%
Belitsa Municipality	9,206	6,990	75.9%
Loznitsa Municipality	7,699	5,748	74.6%
Omurtag Municipality	16,114	11,934	73.9%
Momchilgrad Municipality	14,353	10,464	72.9%
Dzhebel Municipality	8,357	6,067	72.4%
Hitrino Municipality	5,654	4,016	71.0%
Opaka Municipality	5,487	3,878	70.7%
Dulovo Municipality	24,201	17,050	70.5%
Varbitsa Municipality	7,724	5,433	70.4%
Venets Municipality	6,103	4,298	70.4%
Garmen Municipality	14,861	10,456	70.4%
Krumovgrad Municipality	16,909	11,734	69.4%
Kaynardzha Municipality	3,950	2,731	62.1%
Samuil Municipality	5,885	4,046	68.8%
Borino Municipality	2,493	1,711	68.6%
Kirkovo Municipality	20,442	14,009	68.5%
Kardzhali Municipality	6,664	3,250	68.4%
Isperih Municipality	19,138	12,961	67.7%
Stambolovo Municipality	5,458	3,523	64.5%
Glavinitsa Municipality	8,864	5,706	64.5%
Antonovo Municipality	4,606	2,930	63.6%
Tsar Kaloyan Municipality	4,569	2,810	61.5%
Vetovo Municipality	9,952	5,591	56.2%
Kubrat Municipality	14,228	7,891	55.5%
Krushari Municipality	3,146	1,678	53.3%
Nikola Kozlevo Municipality	5,262	2,783	52.9%
Sitovo Municipality	4,533	2,391	52.5%
Tervel Municipality	11,951	6,166	51.6%
Mineralni Bani Municipality	5,520	2,820	51.1%
Slivo Pole Municipality	8,552	3,850	45.0%
Dalgopol Municipality	12,208	5,071	41.5%
Rakitovo Municipality	13,490	4,737	35.1%
Bulgaria (country)	6,519,789	638,708	9.8%
Blue colour designates a Muslim Turkish-majority municipality, red colour a Muslim Bulgarian-majority municipality. Italics designates plurality.

=== Demographic indicators ===
Muslims in Bulgaria have slightly better demographic indicators compared to the Orthodox Christians in Bulgaria. The reason for this difference is mostly because of ethnicity: most Muslims in Bulgaria are Turks and Roma (and to a much lesser extent ethnic Bulgarians) and those ethnic groups live mainly in rural areas; they have different reproductive traditions and they have a younger age structure compared to the ethnic Bulgarians which leads to higher fertility and birth rates. In provinces with large Muslim concentrations, birth rates are a little bit higher while death rates are lower than the country average. For example: Bulgaria had a total birth rate of 10.5‰ in 1992 while Muslims formed about 13 percent of the total population. However, in provinces with large Muslim populations the birth rate ranged from in 11.0‰ in Smolyan and 11.6‰ in Silistra to 13.1‰ in Razgrad (>50 percent Muslim) and 14.7‰ in Kardzhali (about 70 percent Muslim).

=== Age structure ===
Population by age group as of 2011 census
Ethnic group	Total	0–9	10–19	20–29	30–39	40–49	50–59	60–69	70–79	80+
All respondents	5,758,301	411,866	504,233	745,756	847,944	811,658	841,576	794,105	546,980	254,183
of which Muslims	577,139	47,605	66,881	87,592	88,066	86,266	82,477	65,432	39,403	13,417
Share of all respondents (%)	10.0	11.6	13.3	11.7	10.4	10.6	9.8	8.2	7.2	5.3

Muslims constituted about 10 percent of all respondents in the 2011 census, but they formed around 12 percent of all respondents aged under thirty and less than 7 percent of all respondents aged seventy or more.

=== Ethnicity ===
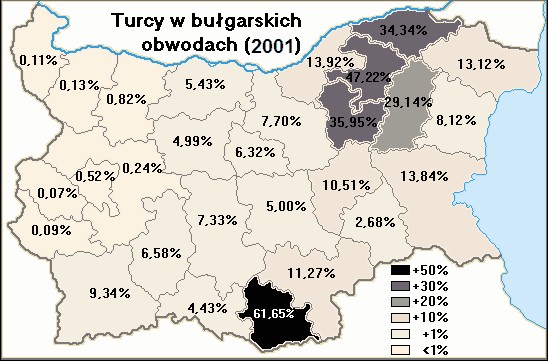
Map of the Turkish population in Bulgaria

According to the 2021 census, Muslims in Bulgaria are divided into the following ethnicities: Turks with 447,893 respondents, or 88.1% of all ethnic Turks, ethnic Bulgarians with 107,777 respondents, or 2.1% of all ethnic Bulgarians and ethnic Romani with 45,817 respondents, or 17.2 of all ethnic Romani.

Bulgarian Turks live in the provinces of Kardzhali, Razgrad, Targovishte, Shumen, Silistra, Dobrich, Ruse and Burgas. They are most primarily a rural population. Muslim Bulgarians primarily live in the Rhodopes, in particular, the Smolyan Province, the municipalities of Satovcha, Yakoruda, Belitsa, Garmen, Gotse Delchev in the Blagoevgrad Province, the municipality of Velingrad in the Pazardzhik Province, and the municipalities of Ardino, Kirkovo and Krumovgrad in the Kardzhali Province, where however the majority of the population is made up of ethnic Turks. Muslim Romani live in the Shumen Province, Sliven Province, Dobrich Province, Targovishte Province, Pazardzhik Province and Plovdiv Province.

Tatar Muslims live in northeastern Bulgaria and the small Arab diaspora is based mainly in the capital, Sofia.

According to a December 2011 New Bulgarian University survey of Muslims in Bulgaria, roughly 64% identified as Turks, 10.1% identified as Pomaks, and 7.0% identified as Roma.

== Branches ==
According to the 2011 Bulgarian census 94.6% of Muslims in Bulgaria were Sunni Muslim, 4.75% were Shia, and 0.65% were Muslims without further specifications. There is also a small Ahmadiyya presence in Bulgaria, but they are not counted on the census.

== Religiosity ==
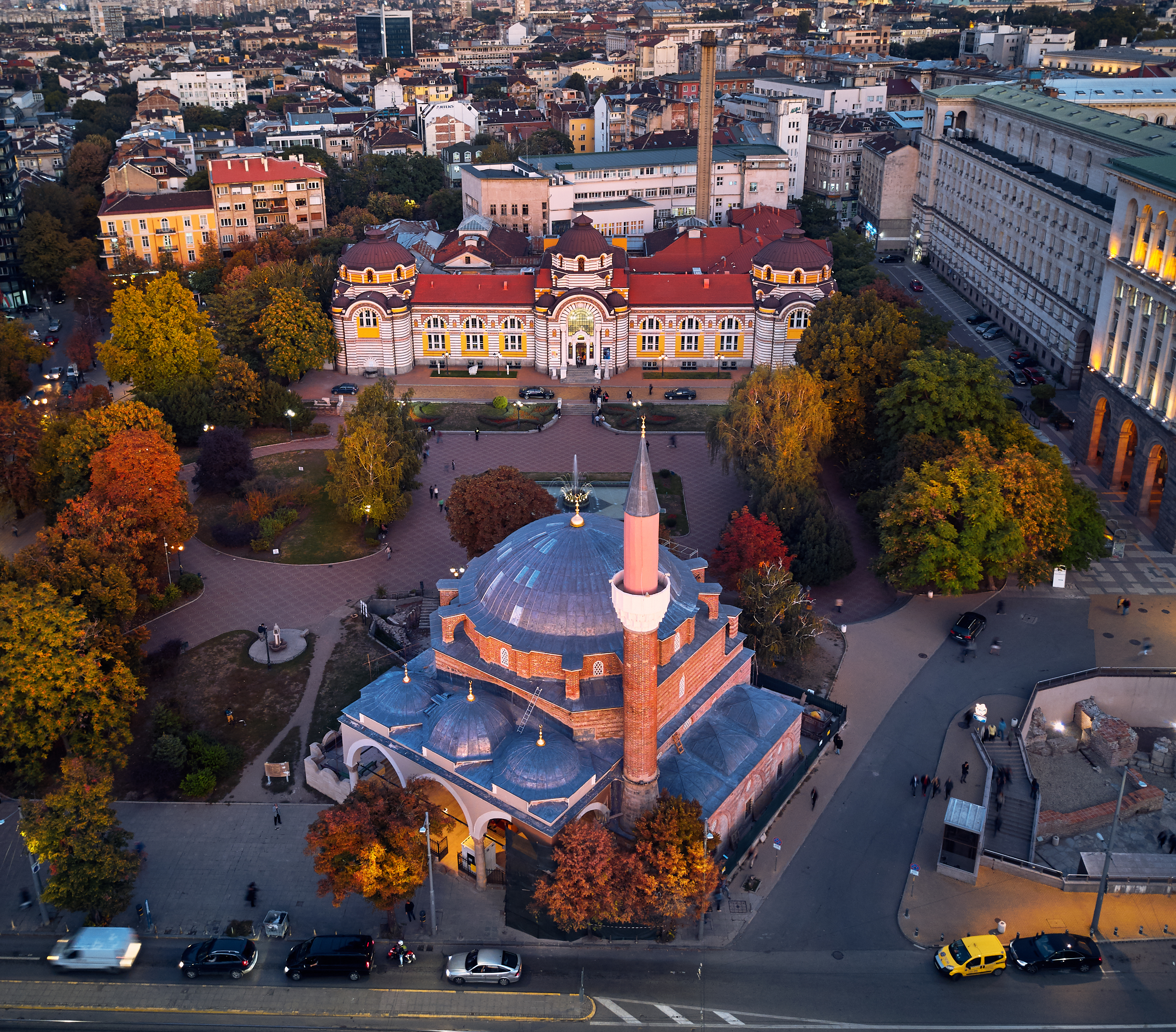
The 16th-century Banya Bashi Mosque is located in the centre of the capital Sofia right next to several churches and the Sofia synagogue and adjoins the buildings of the Council of Ministers and the Presidency.

Evgenia Ivanova of the New Bulgarian University stated in 2011 that "religion is not of primary importance to Bulgaria's Muslims." The New Bulgarian University conducted a survey of 1.850 Muslims in Bulgaria, which found that 48.6% described themselves as religious, 28.5% of which were very religious. Approximately 41% never went to a mosque and 59.3% did not pray at home. Only 0.5% believed that disputes should be resolved using Islamic Sharia law and 79.6% said that wearing a veil in school was "unacceptable." 50,4% of the respondents said cohabitation without marriage was "acceptable" (41,9% said "nonacceptable" and 7,6% refused to answer), 39.8% ate pork and 43.3% drank alcohol. By contrast, 88% of respondents said they circumcised their boys and 96% observed Muslim burial practices for their relatives.

According to a 2017 Pew Research Center survey, 33% of Bulgarian Muslims responded that religion is "very important" in their lives. The same survey found that 7% of Bulgarian Muslims pray all five salah, 22% attend mosque at least once a week, and 6% read Quran at least once a week.

== Culture ==
During the socialist period of Bulgaria's history, most Muslims did not have access to halal food. In contemporary Bulgaria, the notion of halal food is only slowly re-appearing and only a few Muslims adhere to dietary restrictions. The majority of Muslims in Bulgaria who adhere to halal food restrictions are recent Arab immigrants to the country. In supermarkets, there are no signs indicating whether food is halal.

Few Bulgarian Muslim women wear traditional Islamic dress of any kind, such as headscarves, and most who do live in the rural parts of the country.

On 20 February 2013, the regional muftiate in Shumen organized a Sufi music concert, announced to be the first of its kind, because of the participation of a unique male choir consisting of 22 Sufi singers trained in Todor Ikonomovo village. The event was honoured by the Chief Mufti, the Head of the Supreme Muslim Council Shabanali Ahmed, diplomats from the Turkish Embassy in Sofia and other distinguished guests.

In 2013, the council of Ministers granted a day's holiday for Mawlid, two days for Eid al-Fitr, and three for Eid al-Adha. During Eid al-Adha, 2,500 packages of meat were distributed to people in need by the Chief Muftiate. The same year, the Chief Muftiate organized campaigns to help provide food and shelter to Syrian refugees.

In October 2014, the Muftiate launched a campaign during Eid al-Adha to donate packages of meat 30,000 families of any religion.

During Ashura, the Muftiate and representatives of the Bulgarian Orthodox Church distributed thousands of portions of Ashure for the poor.

=== Interfaith relations ===
Since 1989, the Muftiate has made effort to expand interreligious relations between Muslims and religious groups in Bulgaria. In 2013, Muslims helped in the repair of a church in Dyranovets. Teachers and pupils from Muslim religious schools meet with their Christian counterparts.

According to Bulgarian scholar and writer Aziz Nazmi Shakir, the relations between the local Muslim and Jewish communities are "rather positive." In August 2013, during Limmud week, the Bulgarian Jewish community organized in Bansko a scientific discussion dedicated to "The Personality of Moses in the Discourses of the Monotheistic Religions" attended by the Deputy Chief Mufti Miimiin Birali, Rabbi Aaron Zerbib, Pastor Evgeniy Naydenov and Father Petko Valov, the representative of the Catholic Apostolic Exarchate.

In 2013, during Ramadan, United States Ambassador Marcie Ries organized an iftar to which the Chief Mufti Mustafa Alish, the head of the Central Israelite Spiritual Council Robert Jerassy and the president of the United Evangelical Churches Nikolay Nedelev were invited. On 23 May and 8 June 2013, Christian and Muslim women held a charity bazaar (selling prayer beads, clothing, accessories, paintings, etc.) in the square behind Banya Bashi Mosque aimed at providing financial support for the Centre for Medical Care and "St. Ivan Rilski" Nursery in Sofia. In recent years, the Students' Council at the Higher Islamic Institute and the Chief Muftiate, in cooperation with Central Israelite Spiritual Council, the Theological Faculty at Sofia University "St Kliment Ohridski", the organisation of the Jews in Bulgaria "Shalom" and "Ethnopalitra" Foundation have organized interreligious discussions and public lectures dedicated to the philosophical, historical and political relations between the monotheistic religions, hosted by the Media Cultural Centre of the Chief Muftiate. The Chief Mufti met with the Neophyte of Bulgaria and Anselmo Guido Pecorari in 2014.

== Education and income ==
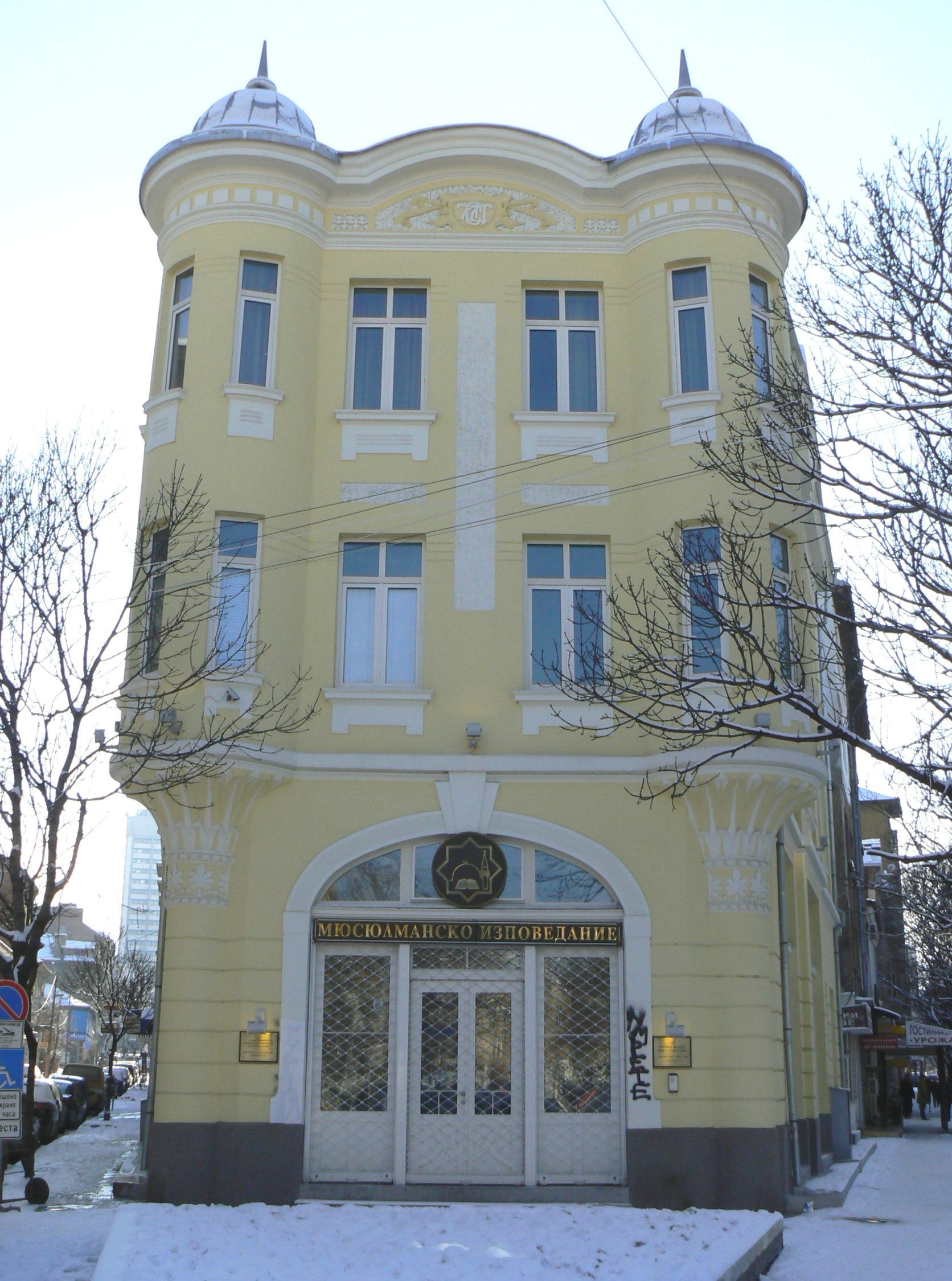
General Mufti's Office of Bulgaria

During the transition to capitalism after the 1990 fall of socialist government, Muslim communities suffered disproportionately. Numerous Muslim enterprises were shut down and the low economic status of Muslims was exacerbated by the lack of education and poor infrastructure in the rural parts of the country. A 2001 study by sociologists under the leadership of Ivan Szelenyi from Yale University concluded that poverty and severe economic crisis affected Muslims and Roma in Bulgaria the most. Sociologists have since used the term "ethnicization" to describe the widening of the economic status gap negatively affecting several minority communities in Bulgaria. Research also shows that educational problems faced by minorities creates social stratification and magnifies negative stereotypes.

== Religious infrastructure ==
Flag of the Chief Muftiate of Bulgaria

Muslims are represented in the public arena by the Chief Muftiate. In 2013, the Provisional Prime Minister Marin Raykov visited the Muftiate. During his visit, Raykov stated that Muslims were an integral part of the nation and promised "the wounds of the past will not be exploited." Officially, the Bulgarian Muslim community is called the Мюсюлманско изповедание (Muslim Denomination). Administration is controlled by the Висш духовен съвет (Supreme Muslim Council), which has 30 members. The core institution, of the Supreme Muslim Council is the Главно мюфтийство (Chief Muftiate), which has 20 departments including Hajj, education, and public relations. There are also 21 regional muftiates. The current Chief Mufti of Bulgaria is Mustafa Hadzhi, who was reelected in 2016.

Ekrem Hakki Ayverdi documented 2,356 mosques in Bulgaria during the 1980s. Currently, the number of mosques in Bulgaria is estimated to be around 1,260. Around 400 of these mosques were constructed after the fall of the communist government, and more than 100 are not currently in use. During the communist era, the estate property acts of most mosques were purged from the archives. The largest mosque in Bulgaria is the Tumbul Mosque in Shumen, built during the 18th century.

The Scientific Research Centre (SRC) at the Higher Islamic Institute was established in 2014. The SRC aims to promote constructive and critical study of Islam and Muslims, especially in Europe. Particular areas of research include classical and modern exegesis methods, ecology and Islam, and Islamic art.

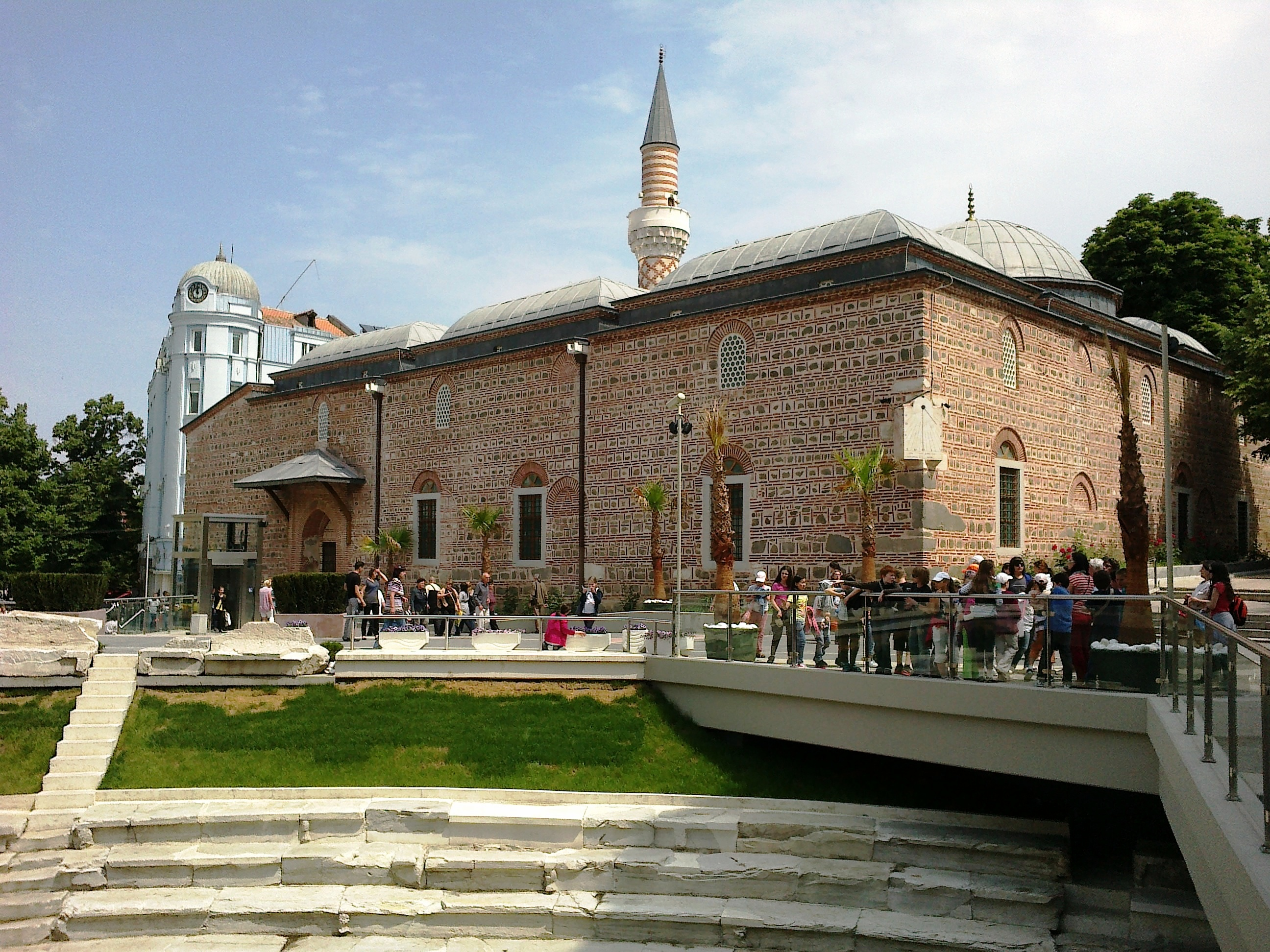
Dzhumaya Mosque was built in 1363–1364 in Plovdiv.

== Controversies ==
=== Islamic dress ===
On 30 September 2016, the Parliament of Bulgaria, backed by the Patriotic Front passed the law that outlaws wearing burqas by women in public places in an effort to combat terrorism and migrants flowing through Europe. However, non-Bulgarian citizens are free to wear the burqa.

=== Islamism ===
In 2012, 13 Salafi imams were put on trial in the Pazardzhik District Court for "preaching anti-democratic ideology" and "opposition to the principles of democracy, separation of powers, liberalism, a rule-of-law state, basic human rights such as gender equality and religious freedom." In March 2014, one of the imams named Ahmed Musa Ahmed, was found guilty and sentenced to one year in prison. Two other imams were given suspended prison sentences and the other ten were fined. In 2015, the case was brought to an appellate court.

In November 2014, several homes were raided in the Roma village of Izgrev of the Pazardzhik Province in southern Bulgaria. Among the 26 people who were arrested for 24 hours was Ahmed Musa Ahmed and six other preachers who were charged with support ISIS. Deputy Chief Prosecutor Borislav Sarafov stated that the preachers were propagating anti-democratic ideology and "non-native... 'Arab' forms of Islam" opposed to the "Turkish Islam" that has existed in Bulgaria for centuries.

Multiple studies, including work by IMIR, have concluded that Salafi and Islamist ideology disproportionately affect the Roma Muslim community due to the community's low economic and educational standing compared to mainstream Bulgarian society.

==== Opposition ====
In October 2014, the Chief Muftiate published a declaration condemning ISIS and appealing to Bulgarian Muslims not to respond to calls for jihad and the establishment of a caliphate.

== Discrimination ==
Muslims in Bulgaria are obliged to register periodic conferences at the Sofia City Court, which members of the Bulgarian Orthodox Church are not required to do.

The Attack Party, IMRO – Bulgarian National Movement, and other far-right factions have used refugees to ignite xenophobia, and at least three racially motivated attacks were reported in 2013. After an Attack MP warned the country that Syrian refugees were "cannibals" and that their presence was designed to disguise an "Islamic wave" supported by American and Turkish interests, a group of Syrian refugees filed a complaint before the State Commission for Discrimination. In November 2013, a new nationalistic party was founded promising to "cleanse the country of foreign immigrant scum." Ultranationalist factions have formed "citizen patrols" to check whether migrants "comply with the law of the state". Some of these claimed to have official authorization from the authorities.

In February 2014, 19 MP's of the Attack Party and the Religious Denominations and Parliamentary Ethics Committee prepared a bill amending the Laws on Religions that would stop lawsuits for regaining waqf properties claimed by the Muftiate. In February 2014, more than 1,000 people from across Bulgaria protested against the decision of the Plovdiv Court to return the Kurshun Mosque in Karlovo, which had been nationalized during the communist era. The same month, protesters threw stones and smoke bombs at the Jumaya Mosque in Plovdiv. They waved signs holding "Stop the Islamization of Bulgaria." Similar protests were supported by the National Front for the Salvation of Bulgaria.

However, local journalists and political analysts have long described Attack and the Turkish minority party, the Movement for Rights and Freedoms (DPS), as "communicating vessels", noting that both of them engage in outrageous acts just before elections to mobilise their voters and that the apparent hostility between them is only performative. Former DPS activists have accused DPS of financing Attack and have alleged that both of them are products of the intelligence service of the Communist regime.

In July 2014, for the first time in Bulgaria's democratic history, the President of Bulgaria Rosen Plevneliev hosted an iftar dinner. The iftar took place in the President's Boyana Residence and was attended by the Prime Minister, the Speaker of the National Assembly, party leaders, and representatives of all religions in the country.

== Notable Bulgarian Muslims ==
- Ahmed Dogan, politician
- Lyutvi Mestan, politician
- Mustafa Karadaya, politician
- Tsvetan Teofanov, translator of the Quran into Bulgarian

== See also ==
- Islam by country
- Bulgarian Muslims
- Pomaks
- Alians
- Turks in Bulgaria
- Tatars in Bulgaria
- List of mosques in Bulgaria

== Sources ==
- Canard, Marius (1926). "Les expéditions des Arabes contre Constantinople dans l'histoire et dans la légende". Journal Asiatique (in French) (208): 61–121. ISSN 0021-762X. Archived from the original on 17 April 2019.
- Crampton, Richard. A Concise History of Bulgaria. (2005). ISBN 0-521-56183-3
- Cesari, Jocelyne (2014). "Bulgaria". The Oxford Handbook of European Islam. Oxford University Press. ISBN 9780199607976.
- Eminov, Ali (1987). "The status of Islam and Muslims in Bulgaria". Institute of Muslim Minority Affairs Journal. 8 (2). Journal Institute of Muslim Minority Affairs: 278–301. doi:10.1080/02666958708716040.
- Guilland, Rodolphe (1959). "L'Expedition de Maslama contre Constantinople (717–718)". Études byzantines (in French). Paris: Publications de la Faculté des Lettres et Sciences Humaines de Paris: 109–133. OCLC 603552986.
- Lilie, Ralph-Johannes (1976). Die byzantinische Reaktion auf die Ausbreitung der Araber. Studien zur Strukturwandlung des byzantinischen Staates im 7. und 8. Jhd (in German). Munich: Institut für Byzantinistik und Neugriechische Philologie der Universität München. Archived from the original on 25 December 2019.
- Mango, Cyril; Scott, Roger (1997). The Chronicle of Theophanes Confessor. Byzantine and Near Eastern History, AD 284–813. Oxford: Oxford University Press. ISBN 0-19-822568-7.
- Mordtmann, J. H. (1986). "(al-)Ḳusṭanṭīniyya". In Bosworth, C. E.; van Donzel, E.; Lewis, B. & Pellat, Ch. (eds.). The Encyclopaedia of Islam, Second Edition. Volume V: Khe–Mahi. Leiden: E. J. Brill. pp. 532–534. ISBN 978-90-04-07819-2.
- Norris, H. T. (1993). Islam in the Balkans: Religion and Society Between Europe and the Arab World. University of South Carolina Press. ISBN 9780872499775.
- Radushev, Evgeni (2008). Christianity and Islam in the Western Rhodope Mountains and the Valley of the Mesta River from the 1500s to the 1730s (in Bulgarian). Sofia. ISBN 978-954-523-103-2.
- Shakir, Aziz Nazmi (31 October 2014). "Bulgaria". In Nielsen, Jørgen; Akgönül, Samim; Alibašić, Ahmet; Racius, Egdunas (eds.). Yearbook of Muslims in Europe, Volume 6. BRILL. ISBN 9789004283053.
- Shakir, Aziz Nazmi (30 October 2015). "Bulgaria". In Scharbrodt, Oliver; Akgönül, Samim; Alibašić, Ahmet; Nielsen, Jørgen; Racius, Egdunas (eds.). Yearbook of Muslims in Europe, Volume 7. BRILL. ISBN 9789004308909.
- Zhelyazkova, Antonina (16 January 1998). "Съдбата на турското малцинство в България" [The Fate of the Turkish Minority in Bulgaria]. Култура.
