= Tsvetan Teophanov =

Tsvetan Theophanov (Bulgarian: Цветан Теофанов; July 12, 1952), is a Bulgarian orientalist, author and university professor who is noted for his research and translations of Islamic religious books and Classical Arabic literature.

Theophanov created the first academic translation of the Quran into Bulgarian.

== Biography ==
=== Education ===
In July 1978, Theophanov received his degree in Bachelor and Master of Arts in Arabic Philology from the University of Baghdad, Iraq. He specialized at the University of Cairo, Egypt (1984), and completed his PhD in 1987 at the Moscow Oriental Institute, Russian Academy of Sciences.

Theophanov's first doctoral dissertation was on the subject Abu-l-'Atahiya and the Evolution of Islamic Religious and Philosophical Poetry - a study of the Arabic Islamic didactic, meditative and mystic traditions, and the process of their development on the basis of Abu l’-Atahiya's poetry (748–825).

Theophanov's second doctoral thesis was titled Classical Arab Poetry as a Dichotomous Model - a detailed analysis of the major opposite concepts in the Arabic poetry and Weltanschauung, and to some extent in Islamic thought (society–personality, desert–town, body–spirit), and a summary of the interfusion between them.

=== Academic career ===
During his career at Sofia University ‘St. Кliment Ochridski’, Theophanov has focused on Classical Arabic literature, Islam, the Qur’an, prophetic traditions, Islamic history, and theology. Theophanov has studied and lectured on the Qur’an and the prophetic traditions for more than forty years. In 1997, after more than ten years of work, he published the first Bulgarian academic translation of the Qur’an and commentaries. It has gone into several editions since then.

Theophanov has extensively studied classical Arabic literature, poetry and prose. He translated into Bulgarian the two volumes of Al-Nawawi's Riyath as-saliheen (The Gardens of the Righteous Men). In addition, he translated the Seven ‘golden’ pre-Islamic odes (Al-Muallaqat) and poems from Abu Nuwas, Abu al-Atahiya, Ibn al-Mutazz, Abu al-Ala al-Marri, Ibn al-Farid, Abu Tammam, and al-Mutanabbi. Other works on Arabic literature include the monographies "The Pagan Arabic Poetry", "The Medieval Arabic Culture" (in two volumes, I: Context, Text, Deeper Meanings; II: Love, Wine, Wisdom), "The Medieval Arabic Culture: From Paganism to Islam", "Phenomenology of the Prophet".

In his youth he published his own poems. He is the author of three collections of poems: "Oases", "Night Pharmacy", "Man under the Sky".

Following more than four decades of teaching and research, Theophanov was appointed dean and deputy-dean of Faculty of Classical and Modern Philology at Sofia University. He also serves as director of the Centre of Eastern Language and Cultures, head of the Department of Arabic and Semitic Studies, and as a member of University's Academic Council.

Theophanov is a member of the American Oriental Society, Union Européenne des Arabisants and Islamisants, and the British Society for Middle Eastern Studies. In 1999, Theophanov spent a year as a visiting fellow at the Oxford Centre for Islamic Studies . He participated in a Plot of international congresses and conferences and delivered lectures abroad. His books, papers, articles and translations have focused attention of the audience with their subjects.

Theophanov is the founder and director of Prof. Tsvetan Theophanov Foundation which works to develop and expand the cultural and academic relations of the Bulgarian institutions with the Arab world. It also aims to promote the Arabic language and culture in Bulgarian society.

Theophanov is also Website creator and organizer of ARABIADA: Arabs and the Arab World Website (in Bulgarian): https://www.theophanov.com

=== Honors and awards ===
- The Japan Foundation Grant for eminent leaders in the fields of culture, education, and the arts, 1994.
- Al-Mutawa Visiting Fellowship. Oxford Centre for Islamic Studies, 1999–2000.
- Alaluddin Rumi Foundation Award, 2001.
- Prize of the readers of the Newspaper Zaman for Contribution to the Social Peace, 2004.
- The Blue Ribbon Insignia of Honour of Sofia University ‘St. Kliment Ohridski’, 2017.
- Sheikh Hamad - the most prestigious award in the Arab world for achievements in translation from Arabic and for contribution to understanding between peoples, 2023.

== Books and other works ==
- Phenomenology of the Prophet. Sofia. 2015.
- The Medieval Arabic Culture: From Paganism to Islam. Sofia, 2004.
- The Medieval Arabic Culture. Vol. 1. Context. Text. Deeper Meanings. Sofia, 2001.
- The Medieval Arabic Culture. Vol. 2. Love. Wine. Wisdom. Sofia, 2002.
- The Pre-Islamic Arabic Poetry. Sofia, 1998.
- Translation of the Holy Quran into Bulgarian with introduction, commentaries, thematic index. Sofia, 1 ed. – 1997, 2 ed. – 1999, 3 ed.-, 4 ed.
- Translation of Imam Nawawi's book The Gardens of the Righteous (Riyadh as-Saliheen) (2 volumes). Sofia, 2008, 2015.
- Translation from English into Russian Shukran Vahide's book Islam in Modern Turkey: An Intellectual Biography of Bediuzzaman Said Nursi. Istanbul, 2008.
- “Canon and Individuality in Old Arabic Poetry”. XVIIth Congress of Union Européenne des Arabisants et Islamisants (Saint-Petersburg, August 22–26, 1994).
- “Abu-l-Atahiya and the Philosophy”. XVIIIth Congress of Union Européenne des Arabisants et Islamisants (Leuven–Gent, September 3–10, 1996).
- “The Dīwān al-Hudhaliyyīn and the Rite de passage manqué”. In: Studies in Arabic and Islam. Leuven-Paris-Sterling, VA, 2002, pp. 337–346.
