= Denitsa Siderova =

Bulgarian politician

- Деница Сидерова
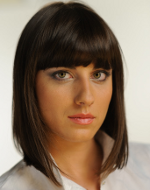
- Siderova in 2007

Member of the National Assembly
- In office 30 May 2007 – 5 August 2014
- Constituency: 24th MMC - Sofia

Personal details
- Born: Denitsa Stoilova Gadzheva; 6 December 1982 (age 43) Havana, Cuba
- Party: Attack
- Spouse: Volen Siderov (m. 2016)
- Children: Volen Siderov Jr.
- Education: Technical University
- Occupation: politician

Denitsa Stoilova Siderova (Bulgarian: Деница Стоилова Сидерова); née Gadzheva; (born 6 December 1982) is a Bulgarian politician and a member of the Attack party who has served as a Member of the National Assembly. She joined the party when it was established in 2005 and was elected as a secretary of its youth wing.

== Personal ==
Gadzheva is a graduate of 105 SOU in Sofia and subsequently earned a degree in Transport Management and Technology from TU-Sofia. In addition to her native Bulgarian, she knows English, German and Italian. Gadzheva was formerly in a relationship with party colleague Dimitar Stoyanov, who has since left Attack. She is married to ATAKA party founder, Volen Siderov.
