= Aterenska reka =

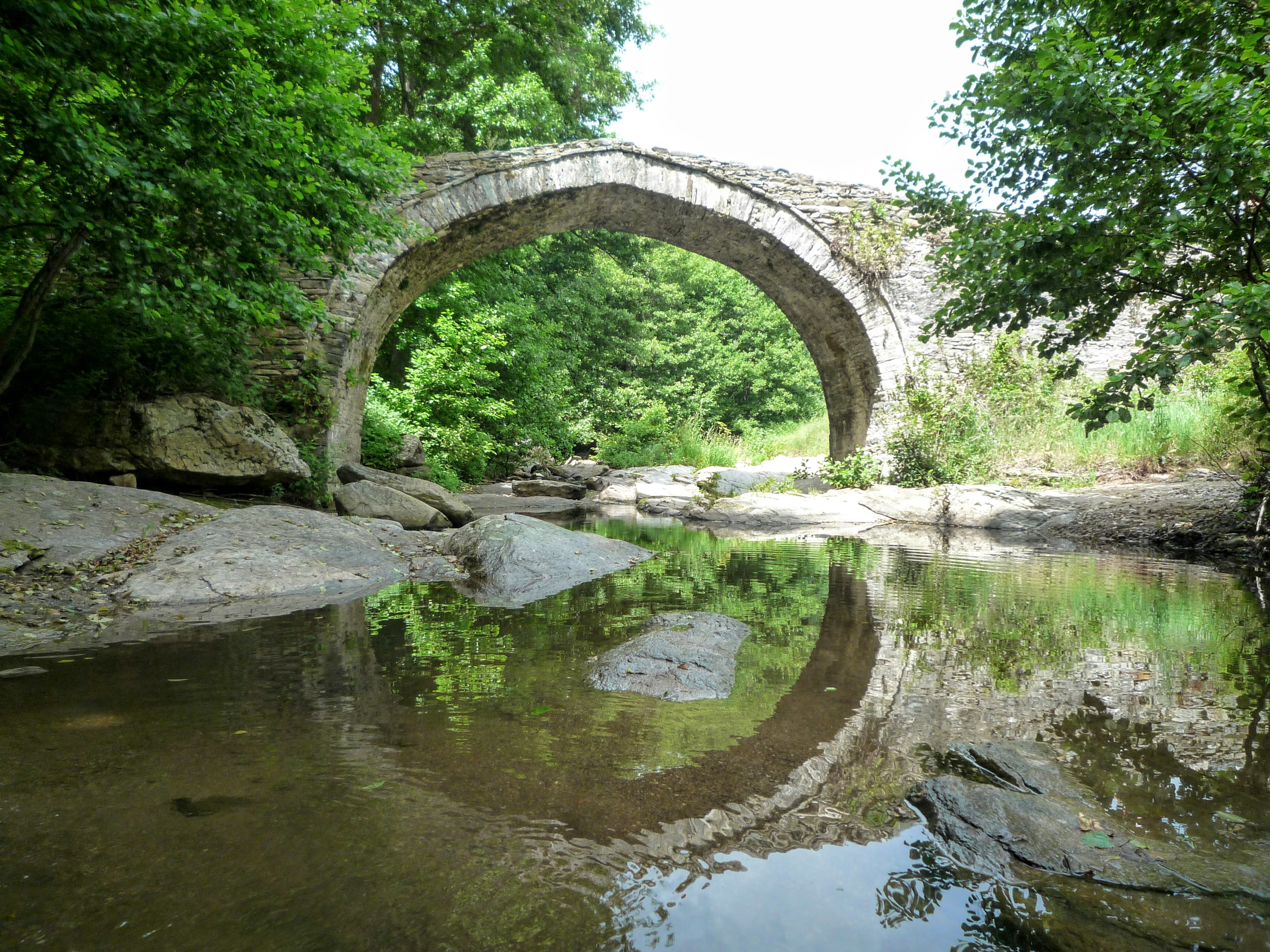
- The river and the Atarenski Bridge, Bulgaria

Location
- Country: Bulgaria, Greece

Physical characteristics
- Source
  - location: Sarta Ridge, Rhodope Mountains
  - coordinates: 41°30′51.18″N 25°58′49.94″E
  - elevation: 569 m (1,867 ft)
- Mouth
  - location: Arda→ Maritsa→ Aegean Sea
  - coordinates: 41°34′55.92″N 26°14′35.88″E
  - elevation: 53 m (174 ft)
- Length: 35 km (22 mi)
- Basin size: 59 km^{2} (23 sq mi)(in Bulgaria)

The Aterenska reka (Bulgarian: Атеренска река) is a river in southern Bulgaria and northeastern Greece, a right tributary of the Arda of the Maritsa drainage. Its length is 35 km, of which 20 km in Bulgarian territory.

The river takes its source from a spring near the village of Cherni Rid in the Sarta Ridge of the eastern Rhodope Mountains at an altitude of 569 m. It flows eastwards in a narrow forested valley, which widens after the crossing of the road Ivaylovgrad–Mandritsa. East of the village of Drabishna the river leaves the territory of Bulgaria and enters Greece. Southeast of the village of Zoni it bends north and flows into the Arda at an altitude of 53 m about 800 m northeast of the village of Kyprinos. It drains the easternmost slopes of the Sarta Ridge.

Its drainage basin covers a territory of 59 km^{2} in Bulgaria. The river has predominantly rain feed with high water in January and low water in September.

The Aterenska reka flows entirely in Haskovo Province of Bulgaria and Evros Regional Unit of Greece. There are five villages along its course — Cherni Rid, Kobilino and Drabishna in Ivaylovgrad Municipality, Bulgaria, as well as Zoni and Kypronos in Orestiada Municipality, Greece. Its waters are used for irrigation.

There are several landmarks along its course in Bulgaria, including the ruins of the medieval fortress of Lyutitsa about one kilometer south of the river, the late medieval Aterenski Bridge 1.6 km northwest of the fortress, and Villa Armira, the best preserved Roman villa in the country, situated 2 km downstream of the bridge, south of the town of Ivaylovgrad.

== Gallery ==
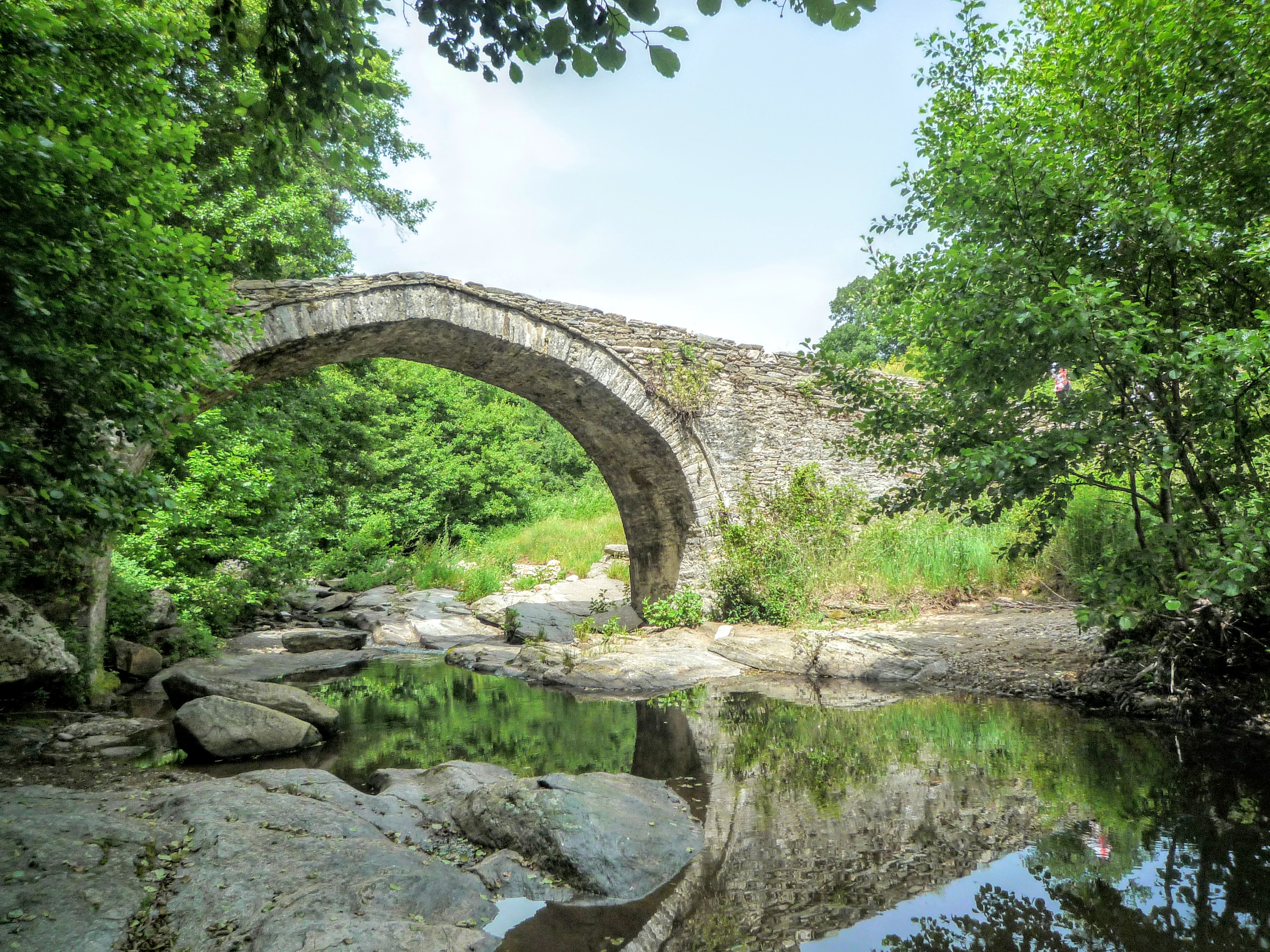
Aterenski Bridge, Bulgaria

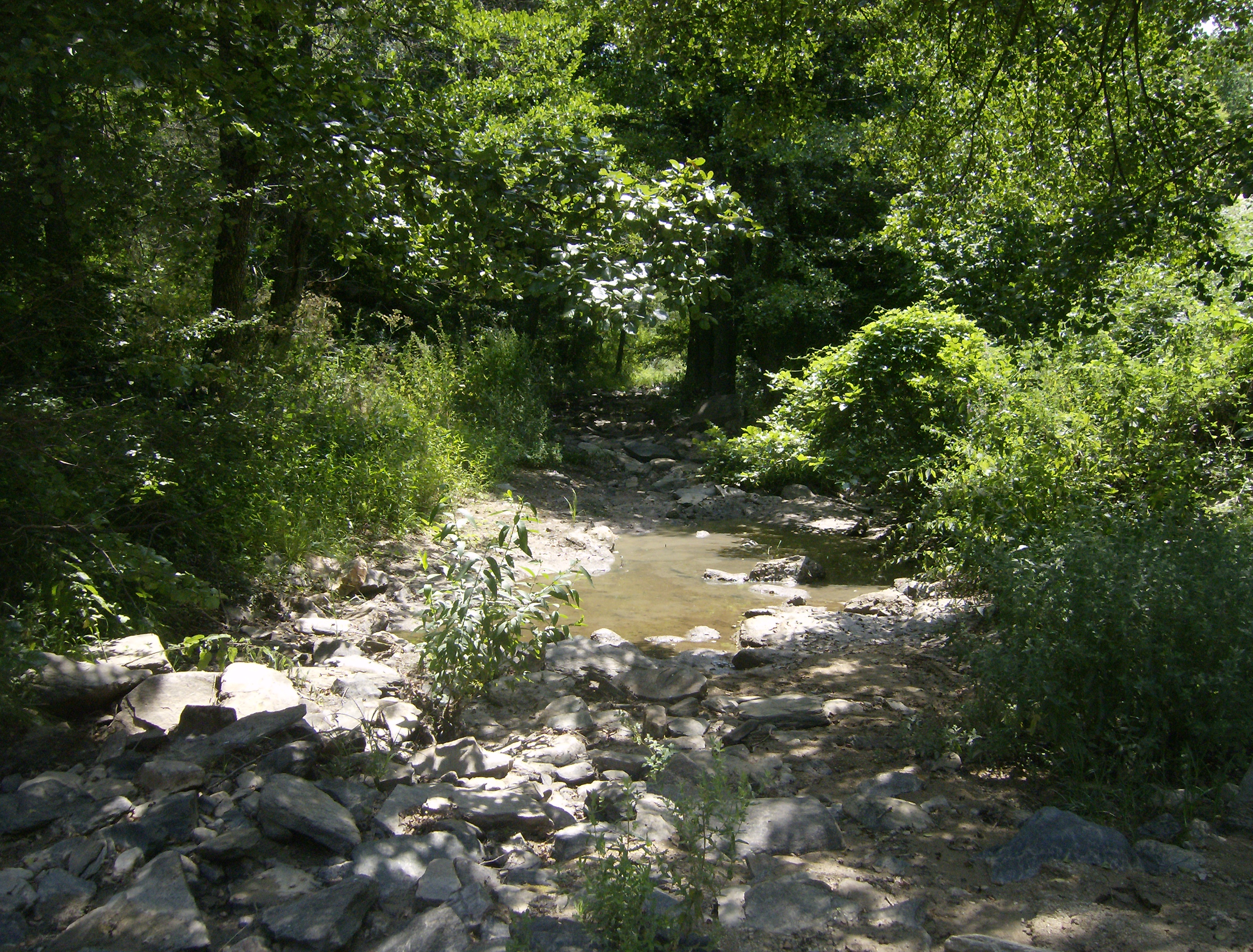
The river in Bulgaria

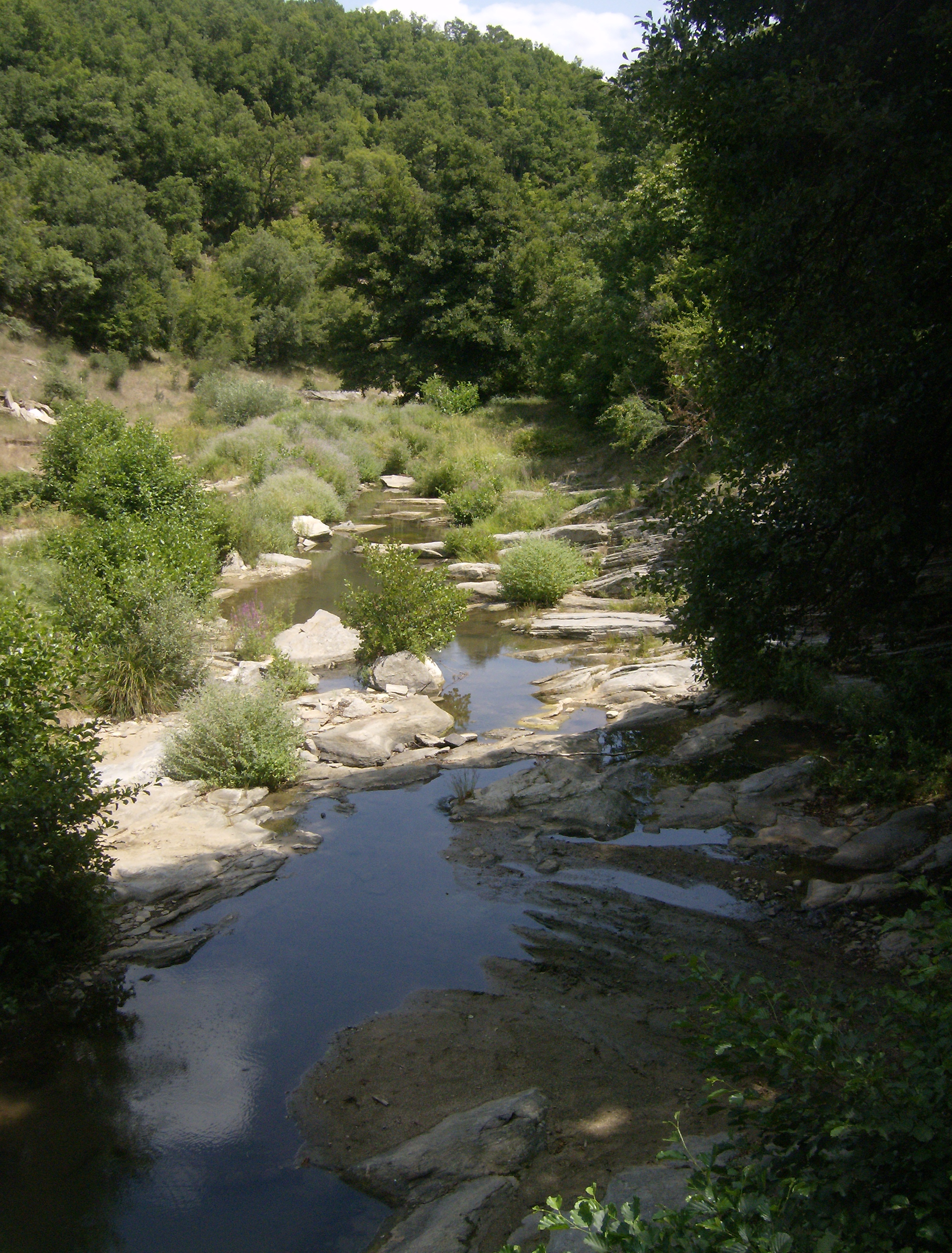
The river in Bulgaria
