= Dolno Botevo =

Coordinates: 41°45′N 25°43′E

- Village
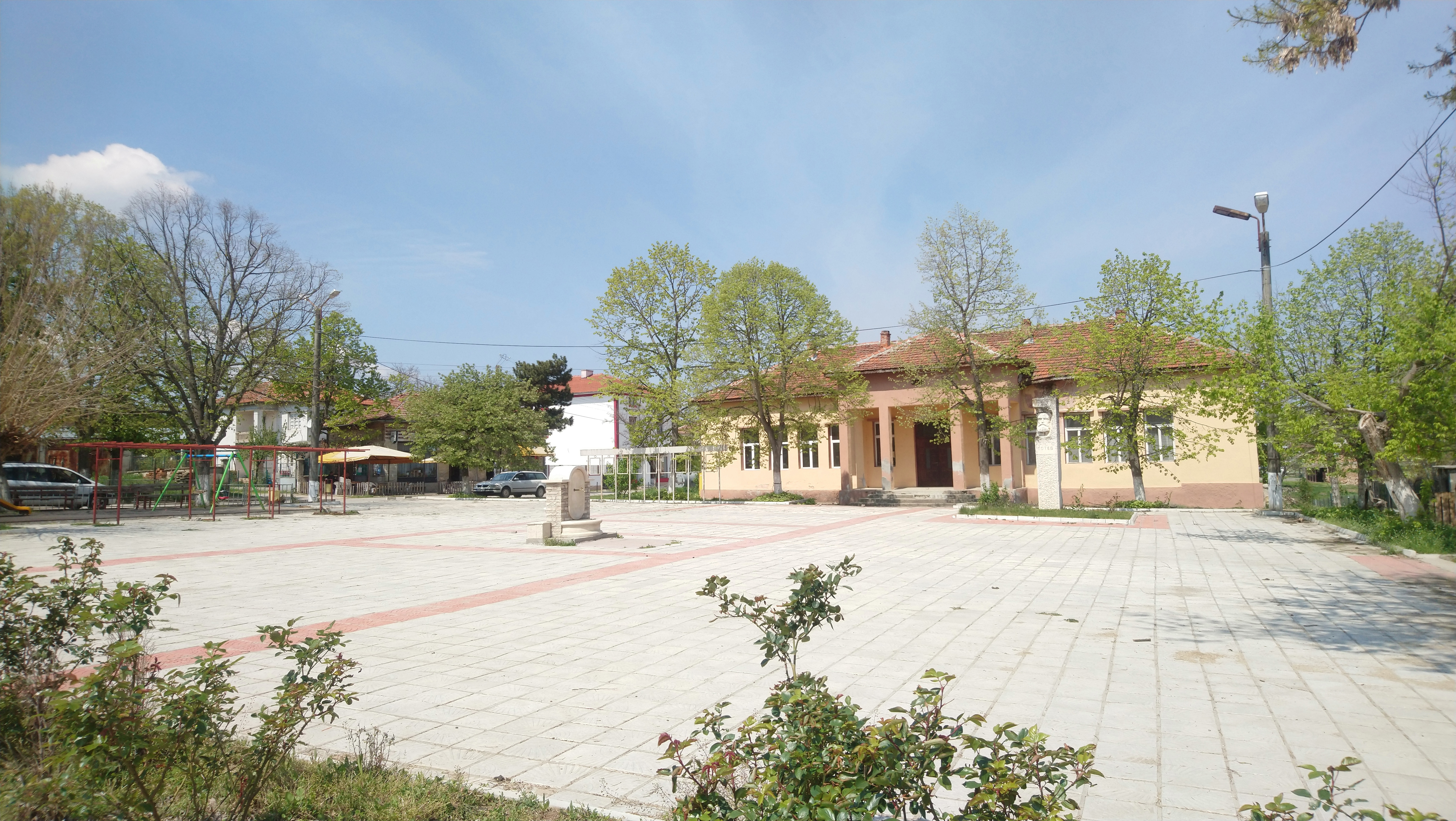
- Village centre
- Interactive map of Dolno Botevo
- Country: Bulgaria
- Province: Haskovo Province
- Municipality: Stambolovo
- Time zone: UTC+2 (EET)
  - Summer (DST): UTC+3 (EEST)

Dolno Botevo is a village in Stambolovo Municipality, in Haskovo Province, in southern Bulgaria.
