= Cherni Rid =

- Village
- Location of Cherni Rid, Bulgaria
- Coordinates: 41°31′N 25°59′E
- Country: Bulgaria
- Province: Haskovo Province
- Municipality: Ivaylovgrad
- Time zone: UTC+2 (EET)
  - Summer (DST): UTC+3 (EEST)

Cherni Rid (Bulgarian: Черни рид) is a village in the municipality of Ivaylovgrad, in Haskovo Province, in southern Bulgaria. It is situated in the eastern Rhodope Mountains. The river Aterenska reka, a left tributary of the Arda, springs near the village.
