= Vodentsi =

- Village
- Location within Bulgaria
- Coordinates: 41°41′N 25°41′E
- Country: Bulgaria
- Province: Haskovo Province
- Municipality: Stambolovo
- Time zone: UTC+2 (EET)
  - Summer (DST): UTC+3 (EEST)

Vodentsi is a village in Stambolovo Municipality, in Haskovo Province, in southern Bulgaria.
