= Zhelezino =

- Village
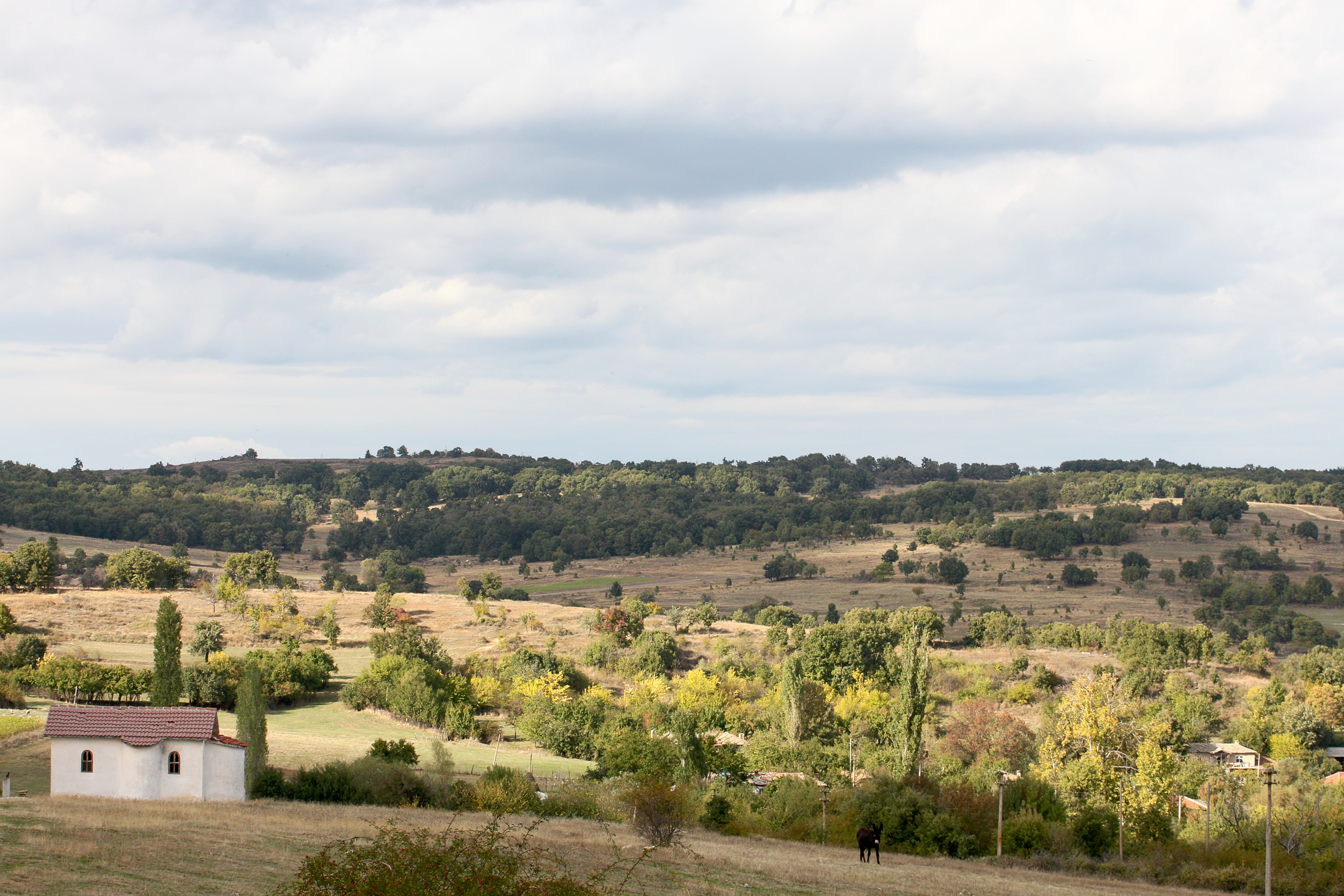
- Overlooking the village of Zhelezino

- Location within Bulgaria
- Coordinates: 41°29′N 25°57′E
- Country: Bulgaria
- Province: Haskovo Province
- Municipality: Ivaylovgrad
- Time zone: UTC+2 (EET)
  - Summer (DST): UTC+3 (EEST)
- Postal codes: 6995, 6965

Zhelezino is a village in the municipality of Ivaylovgrad, in Haskovo Province, in southern Bulgaria. The postal code is 6995, and 6965. The country calling code is +359. The latitude is 41.48333 and the longitude is 25.95.
