= Golobradovo =

Coordinates: 41°38′N 25°40′E

- Village
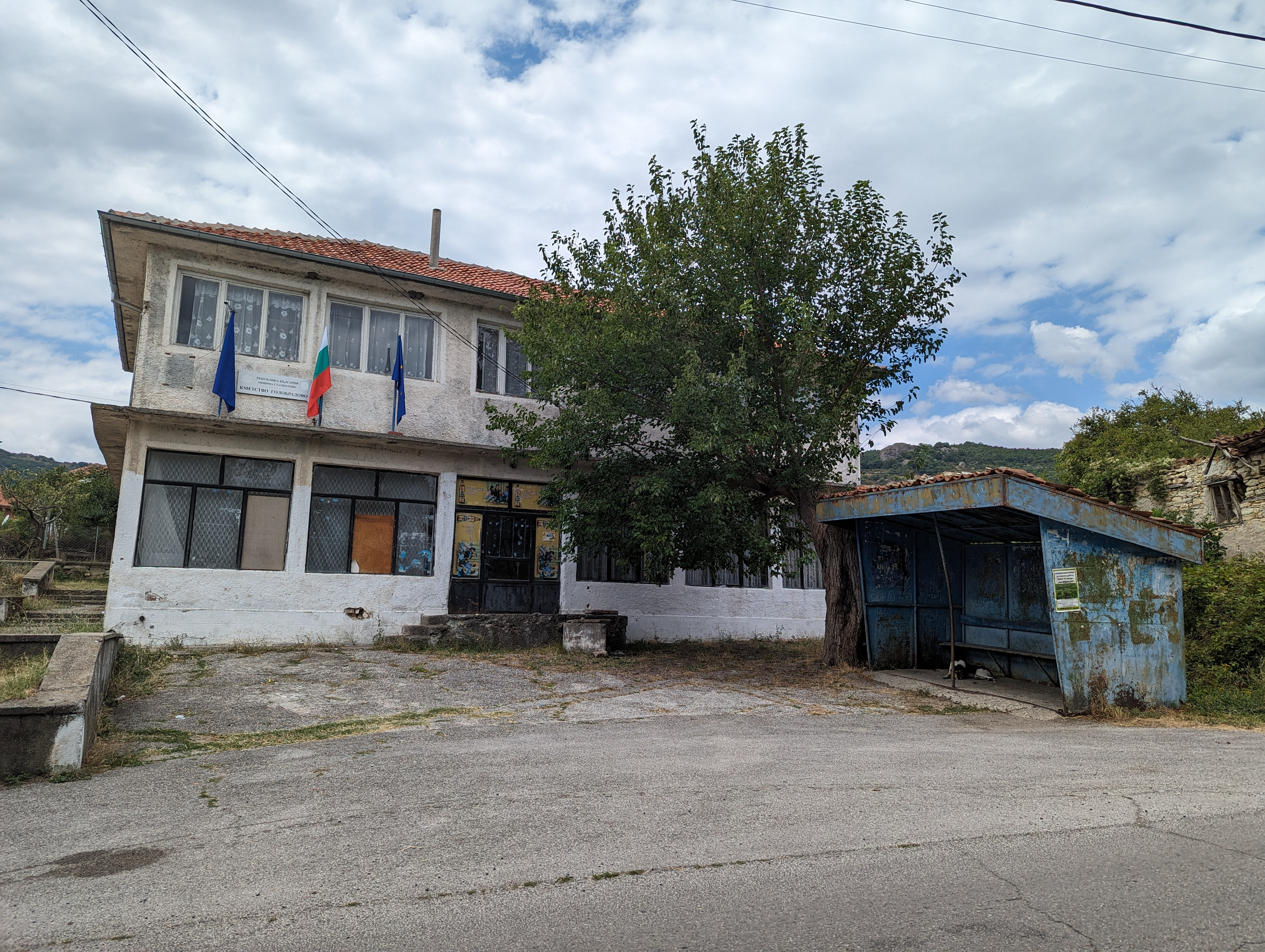
- Village hall
- Interactive map of Golobradovo
- Country: Bulgaria
- Province: Haskovo Province
- Municipality: Stambolovo
- Time zone: UTC+2 (EET)
  - Summer (DST): UTC+3 (EEST)

Golobradovo is a village in Stambolovo Municipality, in Haskovo Province, in southern Bulgaria. Golobradovo is 2 kilometers from the Krumovitsa river. By December 31st, 2013, there were 42 people living in Golobradovo.
