= Gorni Glavanak =

- Village
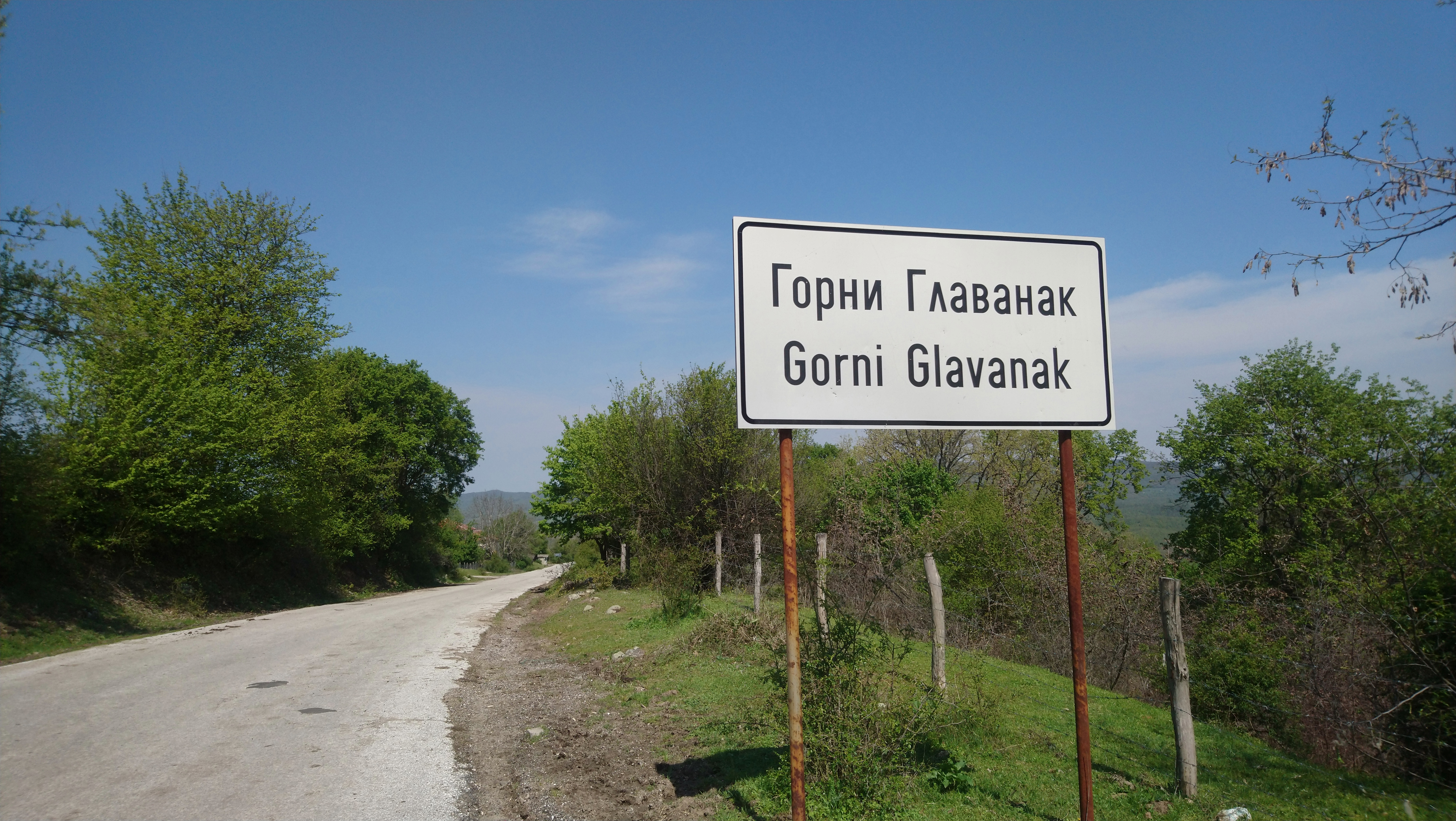
- The sign at the entrance to the village of Gorni Glavanak

- Location within Bulgaria
- Coordinates: 41°40′N 25°50′E
- Country: Bulgaria
- Province: Haskovo Province
- Municipality: Madzharovo
- Elevation: 443 m (1,453 ft)
- Time zone: UTC+2 (EET)
  - Summer (DST): UTC+3 (EEST)
- Zip Code: 6485

Gorni Glavanak is a village in the municipality of Madzharovo, in Haskovo Province, in southern Bulgaria.
