= Pokrovan =

- Village
- Location within Bulgaria
- Coordinates: 41°33′N 26°03′E
- Country: Bulgaria
- Province: Haskovo Province
- Municipality: Ivaylovgrad
- Time zone: UTC+2 (EET)
  - Summer (DST): UTC+3 (EEST)

Pokrovan is a village in the municipality of Ivaylovgrad, in Haskovo Province, in southern Bulgaria.
