= Borislavtsi =

- Village
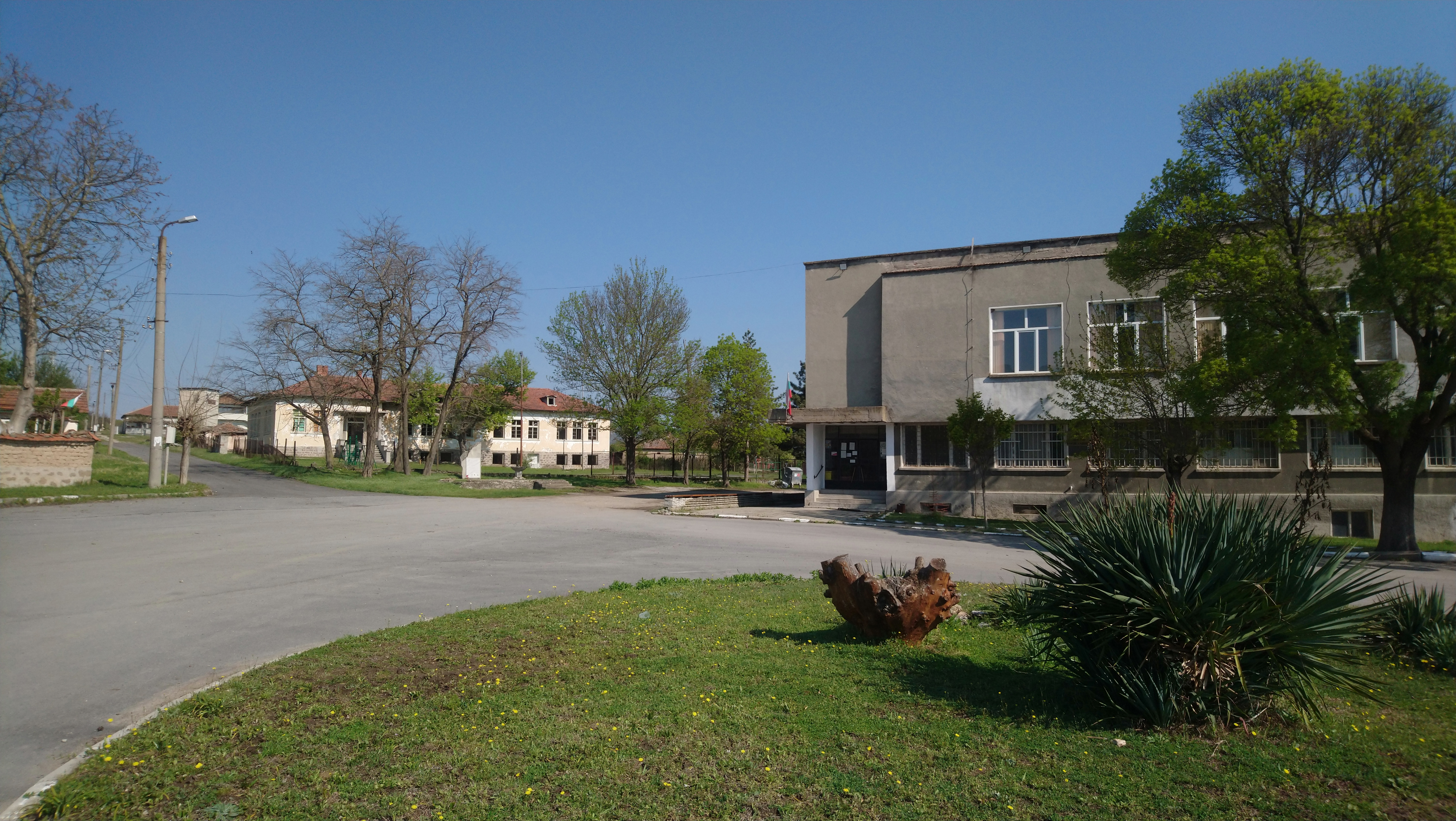
- Village centre

- Location within Bulgaria
- Coordinates: 41°40′N 25°56′E
- Country: Bulgaria
- Province: Haskovo Province
- Municipality: Madzharovo
- Time zone: UTC+2 (EET)
  - Summer (DST): UTC+3 (EEST)

Borislavtsi is a village in the municipality of Madzharovo, in Haskovo Province, in southern Bulgaria.
