= Byal Kladenets, Haskovo Province =

Coordinates: 41°39′N 25°38′E

Byal Kladenets
- Village
- Interactive map of Byal Kladenets
- Country: Bulgaria
- Province: Haskovo Province
- Municipality: Stambolovo
- Time zone: UTC+2 (EET)
  - Summer (DST): UTC+3 (EEST)

Byal Kladenets is a village in Stambolovo Municipality, in Haskovo Province, in southern Bulgaria.
