= Kamilski Dol =

- Village
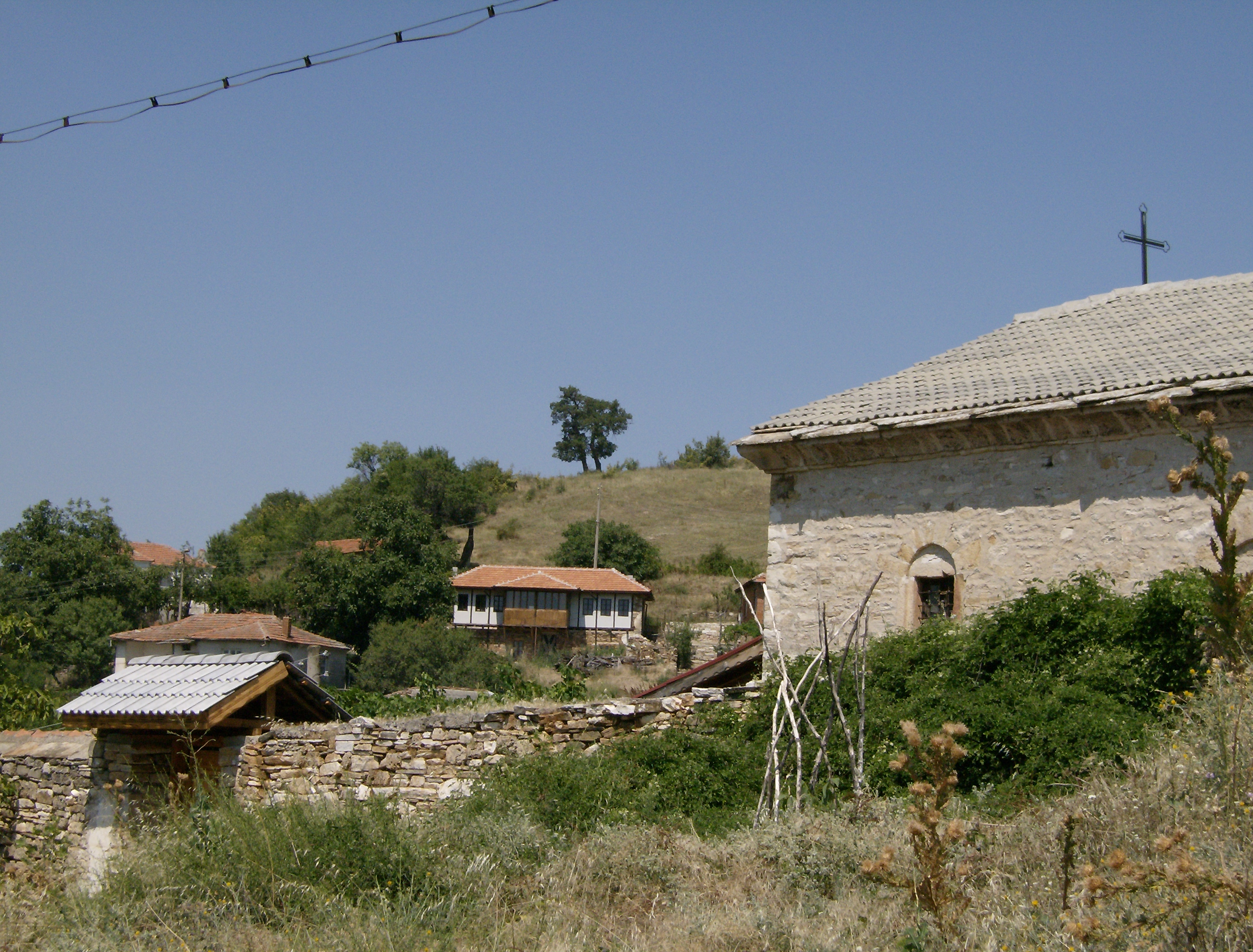
- Village church

- Location within Bulgaria
- Coordinates: 41°36′N 26°04′E
- Country: Bulgaria
- Province: Haskovo Province
- Municipality: Ivaylovgrad

Population (2022)
  - Total: 43
- Time zone: UTC+2 (EET)
  - Summer (DST): UTC+3 (EEST)

Kamilski Dol is a village in the municipality of Ivaylovgrad, in Haskovo Province, in southern Bulgaria.
