= Zhalti Bryag =

Zhalti Bryag Жълти бряг
- Village
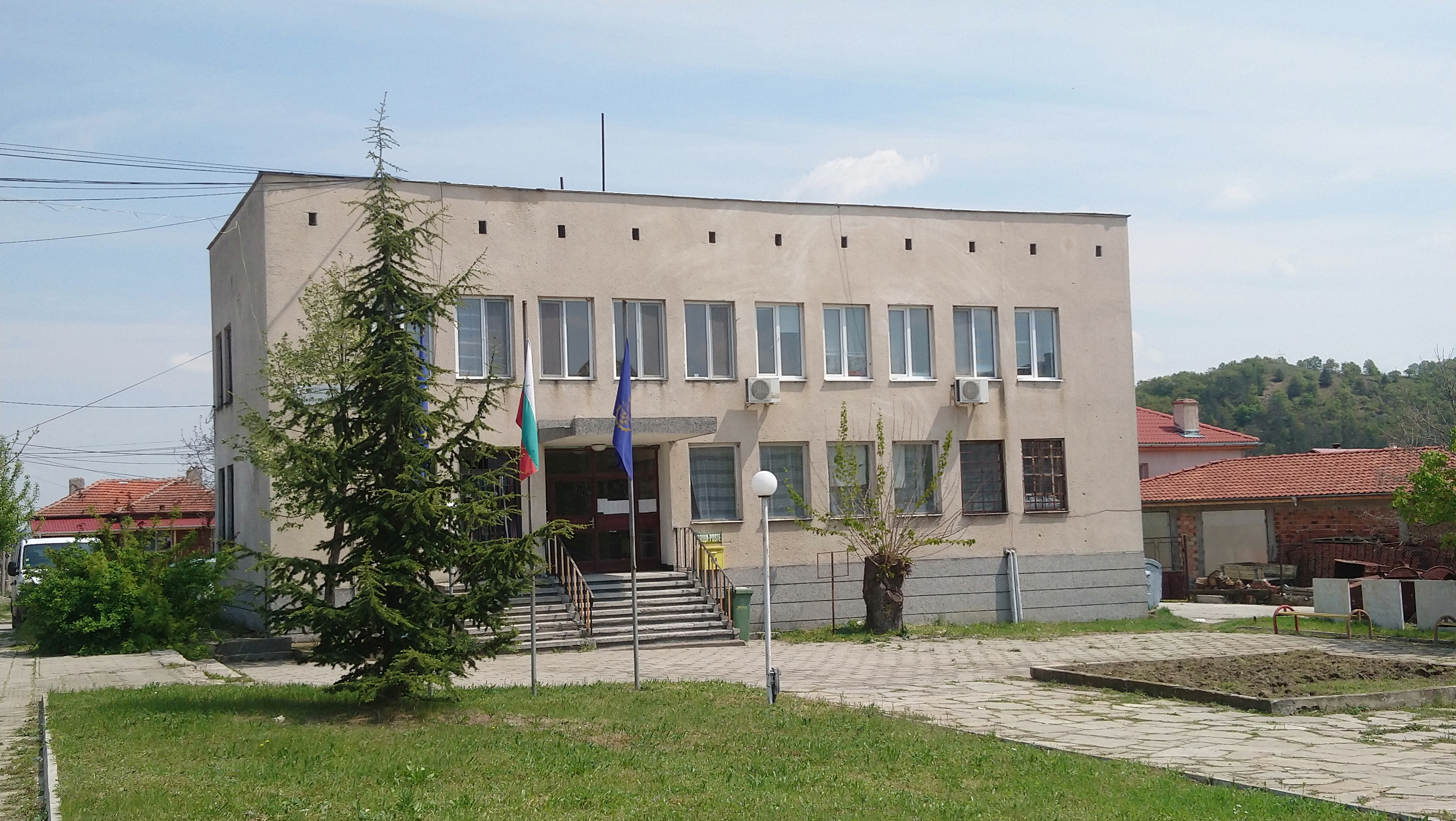
- Village hall

- Location within Bulgaria
- Coordinates: 41°48′N 25°38′E
- Country: Bulgaria
- Province: Haskovo Province
- Municipality: Stambolovo
- Time zone: UTC+2 (EET)
  - Summer (DST): UTC+3 (EEST)

Zhalti Bryag is a village in Stambolovo Municipality in Haskovo Province in southern Bulgaria.
