= Sborino =

- Village
- Location within Bulgaria
- Coordinates: 41°31′N 25°55′E
- Country: Bulgaria
- Province: Haskovo Province
- Municipality: Ivaylovgrad

Population
  - Total: 0
- Time zone: UTC+2 (EET)
  - Summer (DST): UTC+3 (EEST)

Sborino is a village in the municipality of Ivaylovgrad, in Haskovo Province, in southern Bulgaria. The village's original name was Jumaya, it was changed to Sborino in 1934. The settlement is currently uninhabited and has been so since at least 2015.
