= Pchelari =

- Village
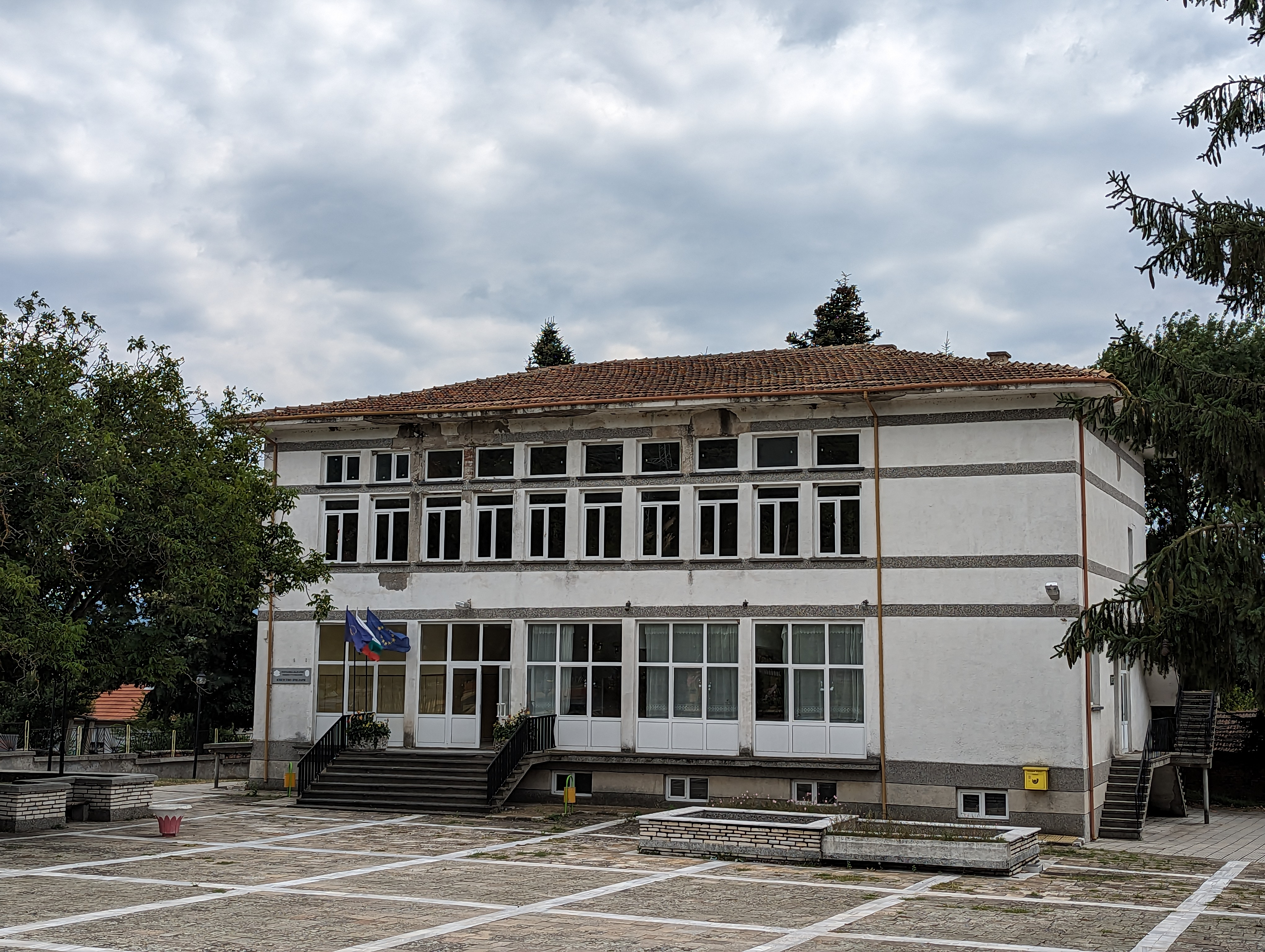
- Village hall

- Location within Bulgaria
- Coordinates: 41°38′N 25°41′E
- Country: Bulgaria
- Province: Haskovo Province
- Municipality: Stambolovo
- Time zone: UTC+2 (EET)
  - Summer (DST): UTC+3 (EEST)

Pchelari is a village in Stambolovo Municipality, in Haskovo Province, in southern Bulgaria.
