= Stambolovo =

Stambolovo (Bulgarian: Стамболово) may refer to several villages in Bulgaria named after Stefan Stambolov:

- Stambolovo, Haskovo Province, the administrative centre of Stambolovo municipality in Haskovo Province, Bulgaria
- Stambolovo, Ruse Province, a village in Slivo Pole Municipality, Bulgaria
- Stambolovo, Sofia Province
- Stambolovo, Veliko Tarnovo Province
