= Dolno Sadievo =

- Village
- Location in Bulgaria
- Coordinates: 41°42′35″N 25°44′30″E
- Country: Bulgaria
- Province: Haskovo Province
- Municipality: Madzharovo
- Time zone: UTC+2 (EET)
  - Summer (DST): UTC+3 (EEST)

Dolno Sadievo is a village in the municipality of Madzharovo, in Haskovo Province, in southern Bulgaria.
