= Rabovo =

- Village
- Location within Bulgaria
- Coordinates: 41°37′N 25°40′E
- Country: Bulgaria
- Province: Haskovo Province
- Municipality: Stambolovo
- Time zone: UTC+2 (EET)
  - Summer (DST): UTC+3 (EEST)

Rabovo is a village in Stambolovo Municipality, in Haskovo Province, in southern Bulgaria. Rabovo is situated next to the Krumovitsa river.
