= Villa Armira =

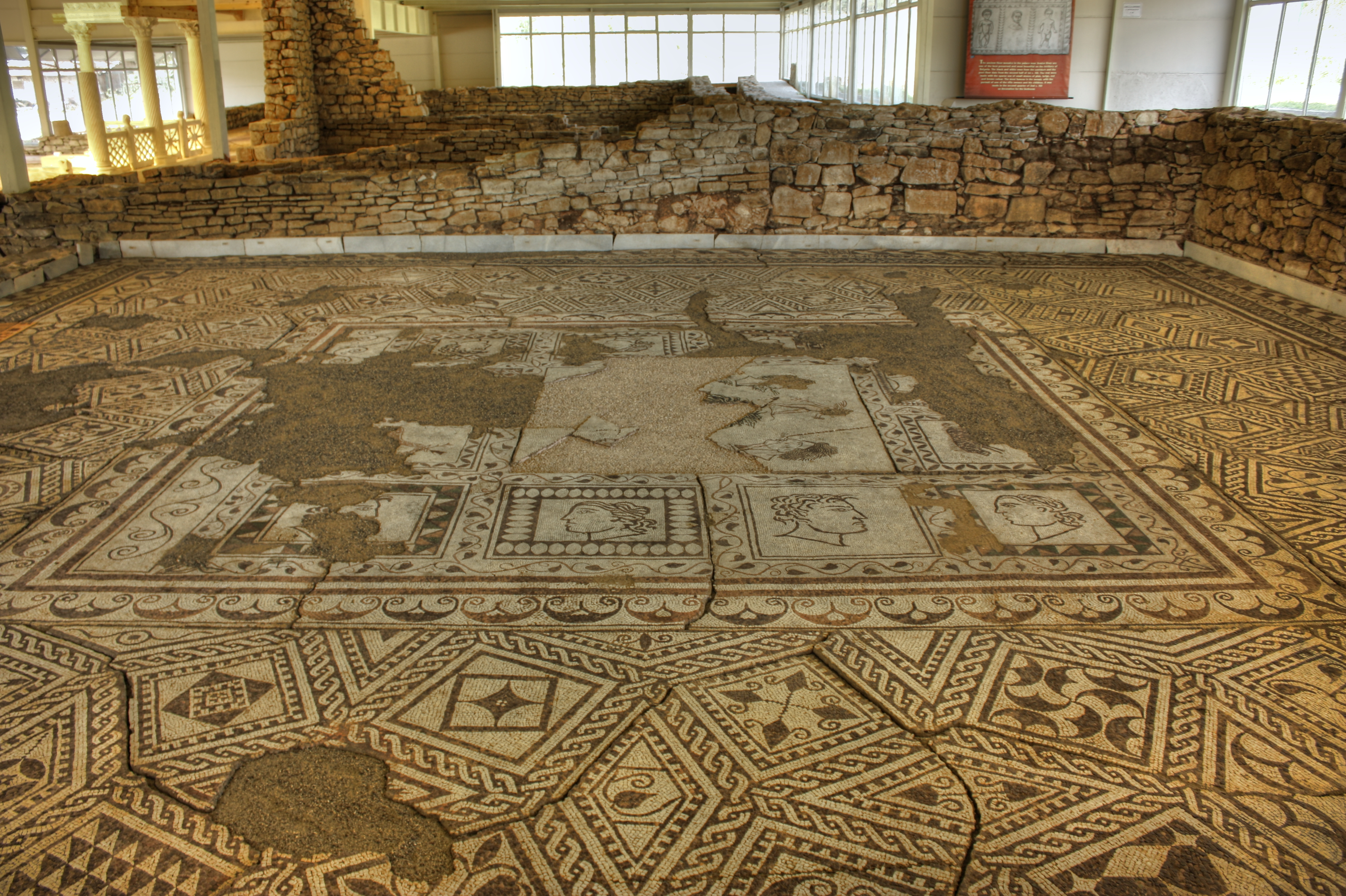
- Interior of Villa Armira with its complex ancient Roman floor mosaics

- Location within Bulgaria
- 41.499080°N 26.106319°E
- Type: Villa
- Periods: Roman Empire
- Location: Ivaylovgrad, Bulgaria

History
- Built: 1st century
- Abandoned: 4th century

Site notes
- Material: bricks, stones, marble
- Excavation dates: 1964
- Condition: restored
- Public access: allowed

Villa Armira (Bulgarian: Вила “Армира”), is a 1st-century suburban Roman villa in southeastern Bulgaria, located in the proximity of Ivaylovgrad, Haskovo Province. Discovered in 1964 during reservoir construction, it is a primary historical attraction to the Ivaylovgrad area. It is classified as a monument of culture of national importance.

Villa Armira lies some 4 kilometres (2.5 mi) southwest of Ivaylovgrad. It was named after the Armira River, a minor tributary of the Arda. It is a sumptuous palace villa and one of the largest and most richly decorated ancient Roman villas excavated in Bulgaria.

== History ==
The villa dates to the second half of the 1st century AD and originally belonged to a noble of Roman Thrace who is thought to have been the governor of the surrounding area.

It is thought to have been destroyed in the late 4th century, possibly by the Goths some time around the Battle of Adrianople of 378. According to some scholars, Armira might be the villa in which the emperor Valens, wounded in the battle, had sought refuge.

== Features ==
Villa Armira features many examples of the Roman tradition in designing and organizing villas.

=== Architecture of the Villa ===
Villa Armira is composed of two floors, and it contains the typical rooms that other Roman villas would have. The two-storey U-shaped villa spreads over 3,600 square metres (39,000 sq ft) amidst a garden, with an impluvium in the middle. Villa Armira had 22 separate rooms on the ground floor alone in addition to a panoramic terrace. It was expanded eastward in the 3rd century AD with a triclinium and a hypocaust.A part of the villa also includes an underfloor heating system, built for heating the inside of the building's rooms.

=== Decorations ===
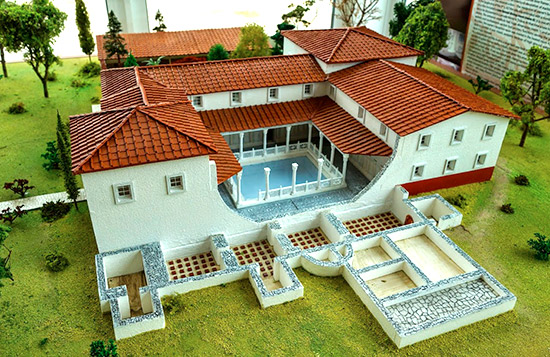
A reconstruction of Villa Armira

The walls of the entire ground floor were covered in elaborately decorated white marble. The villa's complex floor mosaics display geometric designs and depictions of animals and plants. It is thought that masters of sculptures from the city Aphrodisias, a city that was known for its school of sculpture and skillful craftsmen, were sent to work there. The mosaics in the master's chamber depict the 2nd century AD owner with his two children: these are the only Roman-era mosaic portraits to be discovered in Bulgaria. A common theme in the villa's decoration is the gorgon Medusa.

Today the 2nd-century mosaic portraits of the owner and his children can be seen in the National Historical Museum in Sofia, the ceramic finds are exhibited in the National Archaeological Museum, while copies of the marble decoration are part of the Kardzhali Regional Historical Museum's fund.

The villa itself, with many of the floor mosaics intact, underwent Phare-funded reconstruction and anastylosis and was opened for visitors in 2008.

== Gallery ==
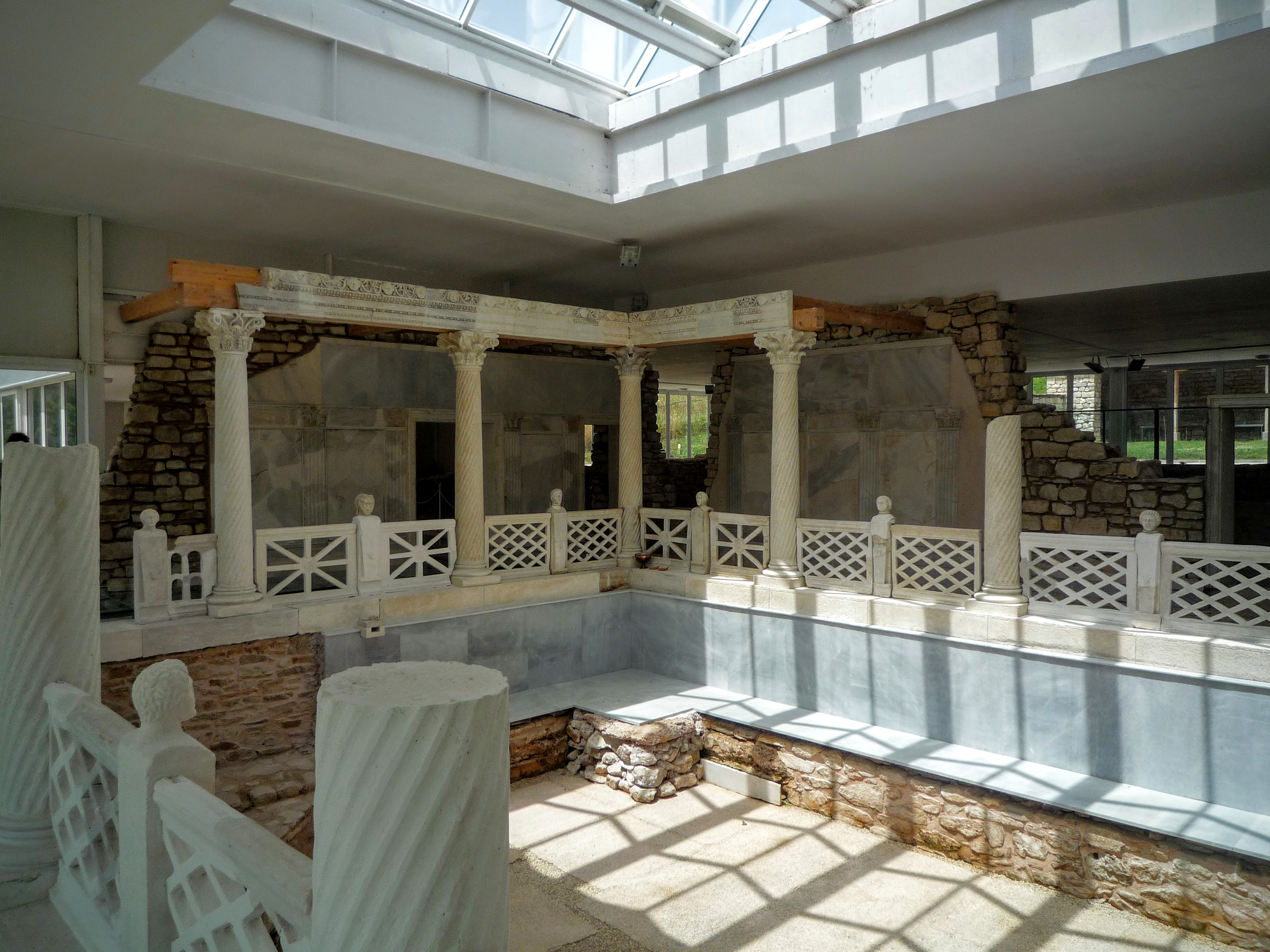
Interior view

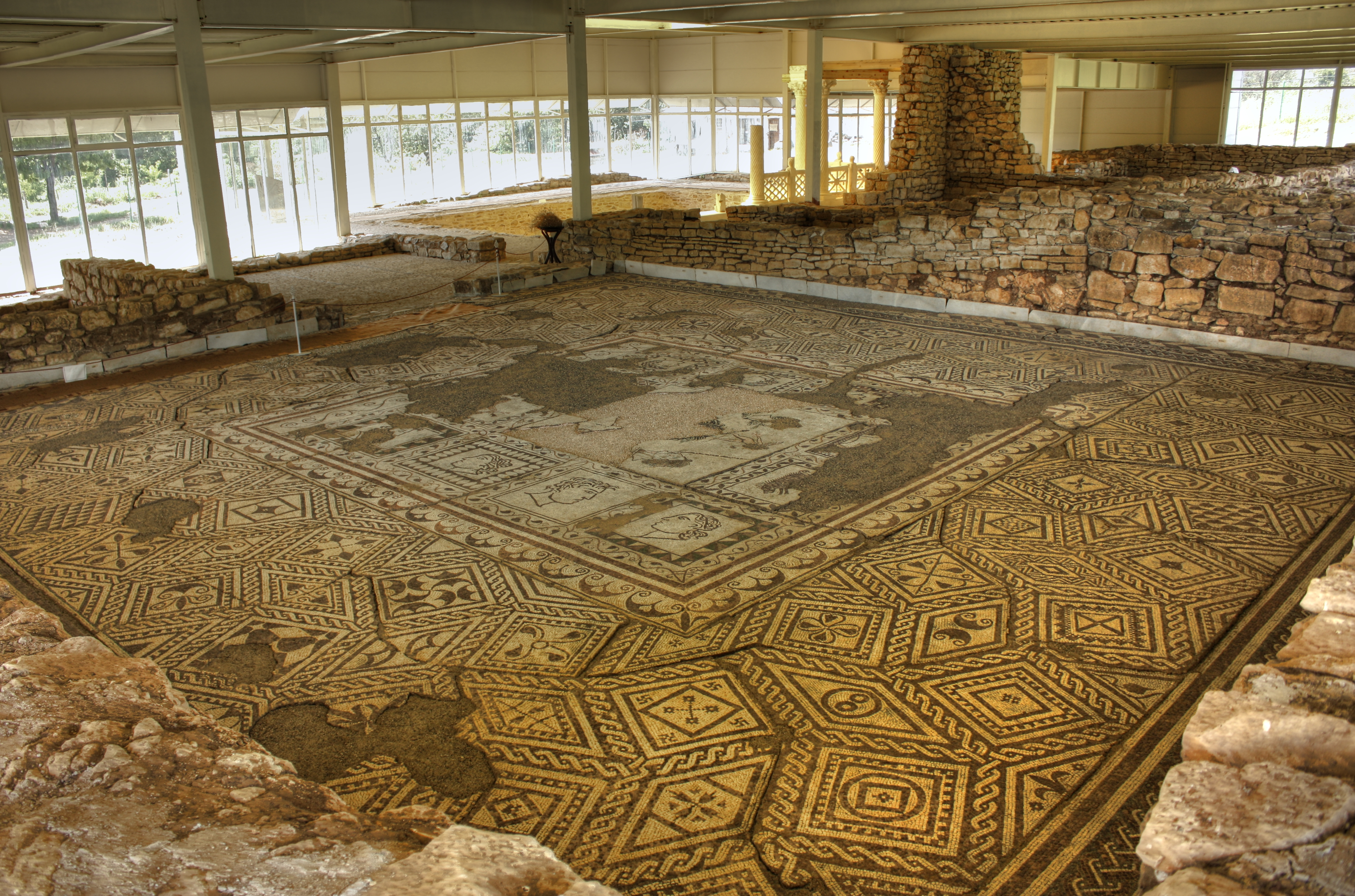
Interior view

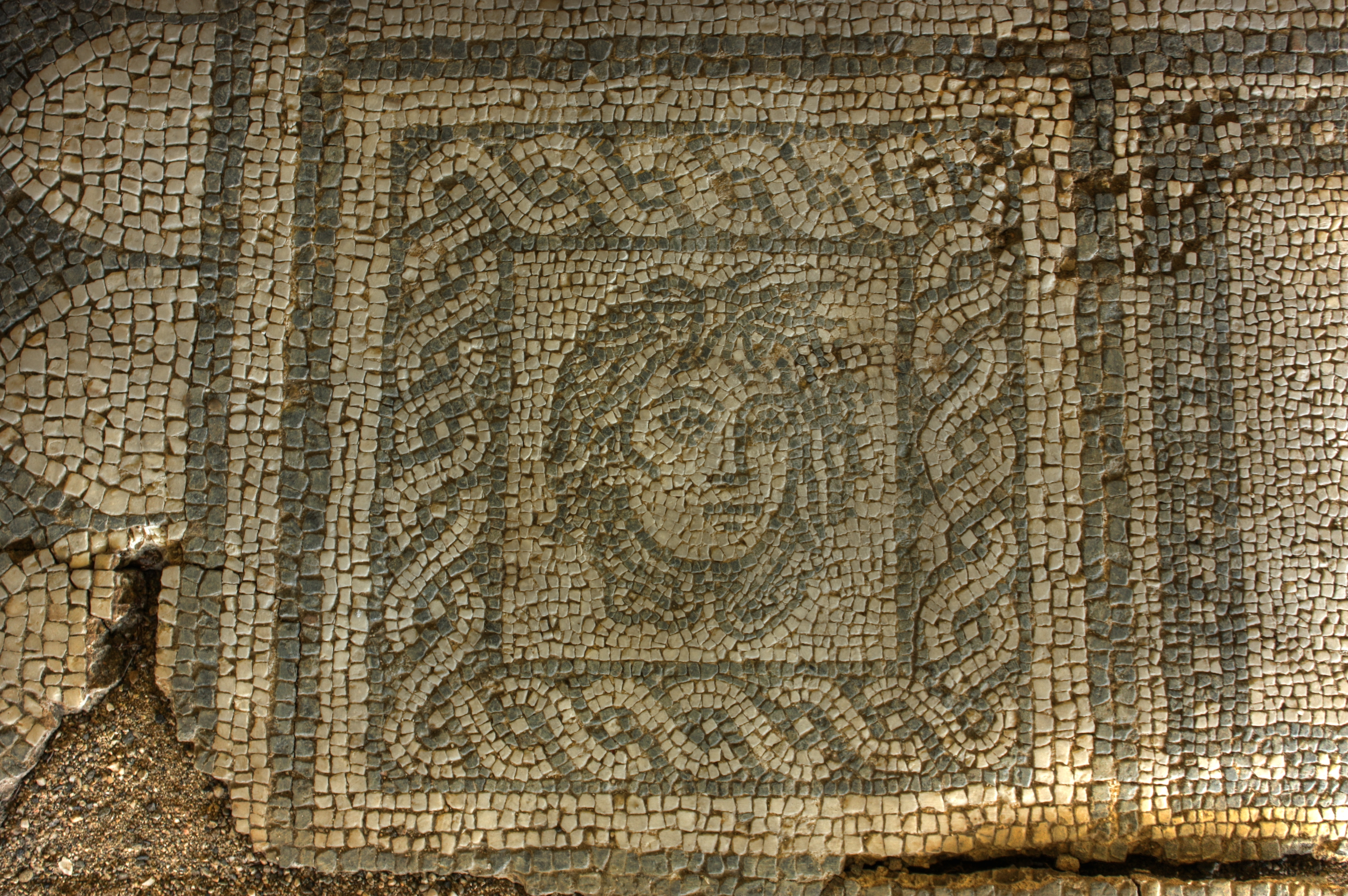
Mosaic depiction of the gorgon Medusa

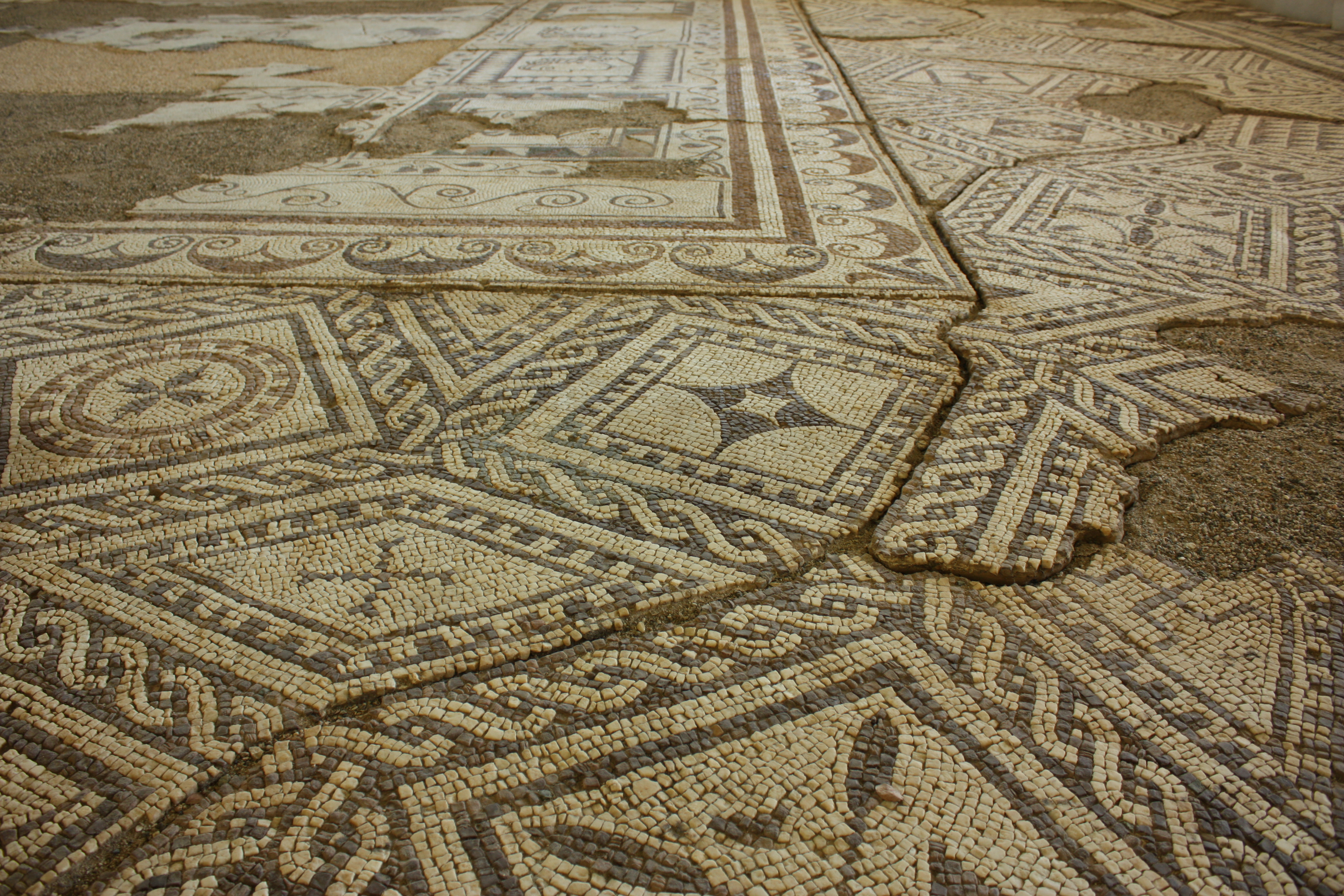
Geometric floor mosaics
