= Gino Tonev =

Bulgarian general

Gino Kirilov Tonev (Bulgarian:Гиньо Кирилов Тонев) is a Bulgarian officer, lieutenant general.

== Biography ==
He was born on December 6, 1943, in Simeonovgrad. He studied at the Vasil Levski Military School in Veliko Tarnovo. He graduated in 1966 in the profile "tank-militia". He was a platoon commander in the 49th Motor Rifle Regiment in Simeonovgrad. In 1976 he graduated from the Military Academy in Sofia. He then became Chief of Staff of the 49th Motorized Rifle Regiment. He remained in this position until 1978, when he became Deputy Regiment Commander. He later became chief of the operations division of the Second Motorized Rifle Division. From 1983 to 1986 he was commander of the 96th Tank Regiment in Chirpan. From 1986 to 1988 he was commander of the 11th Tank Brigade (Bulgaria). He studied at the Kliment Voroshilov General Staff Academy in the USSR between 1988 and 1990. In the period 1990-1992 he was commander of the Second Motorized Rifle Division.

In 1992 he became the first deputy commander of the Third Army. He then served as chief of staff of the army. From December 2, 1994, to July 3, 1996, he was commander of the Third Army. On 3 May 1996 he was awarded the rank of Lieutenant General. He was relieved of the post of Commander of the Third Army on June 26, 1996 after which it became the Third Army Corps. He was then appointed Commander of the Land Forces of Bulgaria. On 24 August 1998 he was relieved of his post as Chief of the General Staff of the Land Forces and Commander of the Land Forces and appointed Chief of the General Staff of the Land Forces as of 1 September 1998. First Deputy Chief of the General Staff of the Bulgarian Army.

General Tonev was commander of the Bulgarian Land Forces from 1996 to 2000. On June 6, 2002, he was relieved of the post of First Deputy Chief of the General Staff of the Bulgarian Army (Bulgarian Armed Forces).
