= Kobilino =

- Village
- Location within Bulgaria
- Coordinates: 41°30′N 26°00′E
- Country: Bulgaria
- Province: Haskovo Province
- Municipality: Ivaylovgrad
- Time zone: UTC+2 (EET)
  - Summer (DST): UTC+3 (EEST)

Kobilino is a village in the municipality of Ivaylovgrad, in the Haskovo Province of southern Bulgaria.
