= Rumelia (disambiguation) =

Rumelia was the part of the Ottoman Empire in Europe as opposed to Asia or Africa

Rumelia, Rumeli, or Roumeli may aso refer to:

- Rumelia Eyalet, an Ottoman province of varying size from 1362 to 1867
- Eastern Rumelia, an Ottoman province de jure from 1878 to 1908, corresponding to southern Bulgaria
- Rumelia (village), in the municipality of Madzharovo, Haskovo Province, Bulgaria
- Roúmeli or Central Greece, a region of Greece
- Rumeli (Istanbul), a nickname for the part of Istanbul on the European side of the Bosphorus

== See also ==
- Rumelia Fortress or Rumelihisarı, medieval fortress in Istanbul, Turkey, on the European banks of the Bosphorus
- Rumelia Railway or Chemins de fer Orientaux, railway company in Ottoman Europe
