= Pyasachevo =

- Village
- Location in Bulgaria
- Coordinates: 42.107°N 25.864°E
- Country: Bulgaria
- Province: Haskovo Province
- Municipality: Simeonovgrad
- Time zone: UTC+2 (EET)
  - Summer (DST): UTC+3 (EEST)

Pyasachevo is a village in the municipality of Simeonovgrad, in Haskovo Province, in southern Bulgaria.
