= Kalugerovo =

Kalugerovo is the name of three Bulgarian villages:

- Kalugerovo, Haskovo Province
- Kalugerovo, Pazardzhik Province
- Kalugerovo, Sofia Province
