= Kondovo =

Kondovo may refer to:

- Kondovo, Bulgaria, a village in the municipality of Ivaylovgrad, southern Bulgaria
- Kondovo, Saraj, a village in the Saraj Municipality of Skopje, North Macedonia
