= Konstantinovo =

Konstantinovo may refer to:

- Konstantinovo, Burgas Province, a village in Burgas Province, Bulgaria
- Konstantinovo, Haskovo Province, a village in Haskovo Province, Bulgaria
- Konstantinovo, Varna Province, a village in Varna Province, Bulgaria
- Konstantinovo, Russia, several rural localities in Russia
