= Konstantinovo, Haskovo Province =

- Village
- Location within Bulgaria
- Coordinates: 42.0000°N 25.8000°E
- Country: Bulgaria
- Province: Haskovo Province
- Municipality: Simeonovgrad
- Time zone: UTC+2 (EET)
  - Summer (DST): UTC+3 (EEST)

Konstantinovo, Haskovo Province is a village in the municipality of Simeonovgrad, in Haskovo Province, in southern Bulgaria.
