= Lyutitsa =

Castle in Bulgaria

Coordinates: 41°30′9″N 26°3′46″E

Lyutitsa (Bulgarian: Лютица) is one of the largest and best preserved castles in the easternmost part of the Eastern Rhodopes, located 3.5 hours' walk south-west of Ivaylovgrad, in southernmost Bulgaria. It is also known as the "Marble City" because its walls are made of white marble.

The fortress occupies an area of 26,000 m^{2} (280,000 sq ft) and has 12 towers of which eight have been preserved. The walls are up to 10 metres (33 ft) high. The ruins of two churches have been excavated as well as a necropolis with 15 graves. Among the numerous archaeological finds are rare coins, ceramics from Preslav, jewelry and tools.

== Honour ==
Lyutitsa Nunatak on Greenwich Island in the South Shetland Islands, Antarctica is named after Lyutitsa.

== Gallery ==
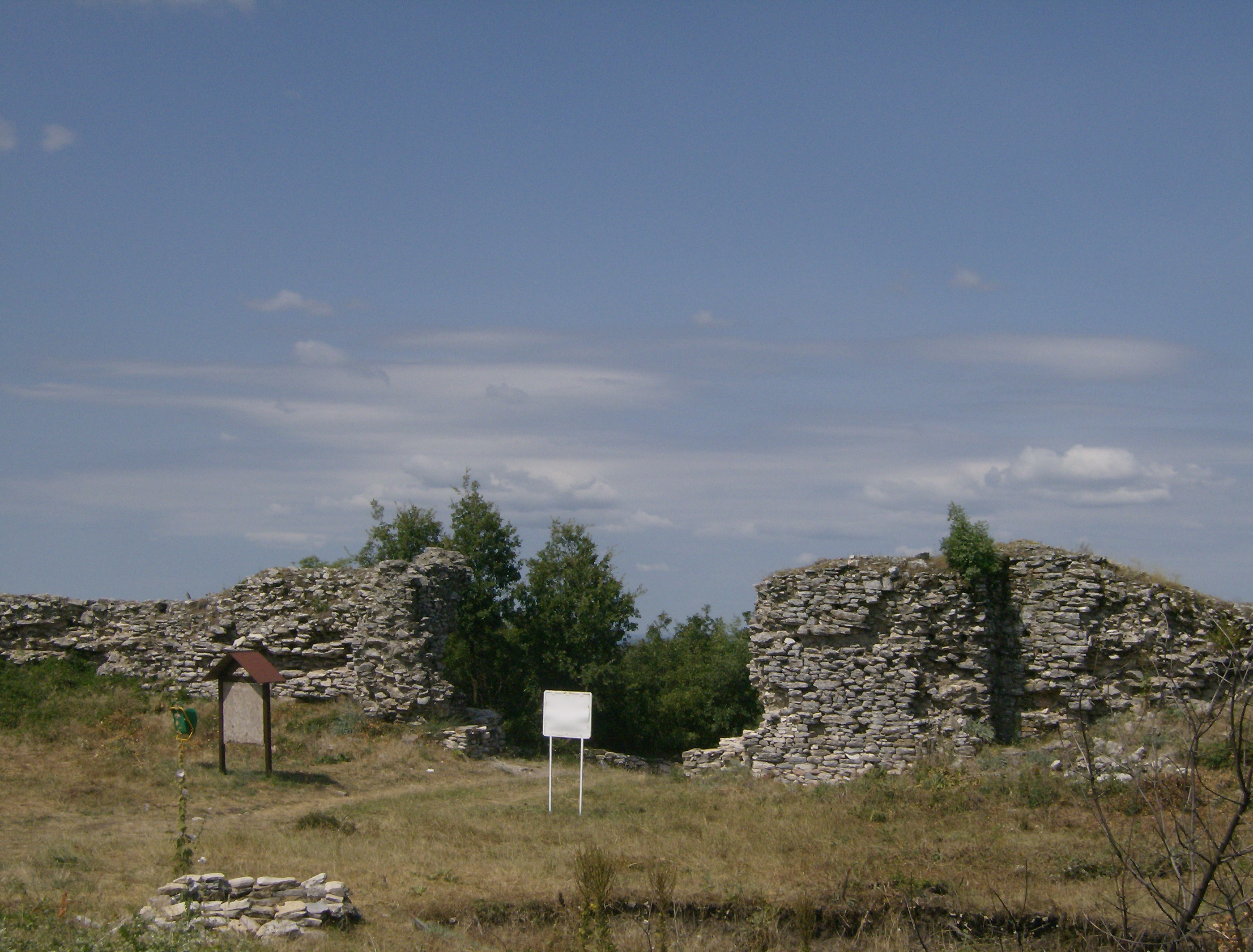
Gate

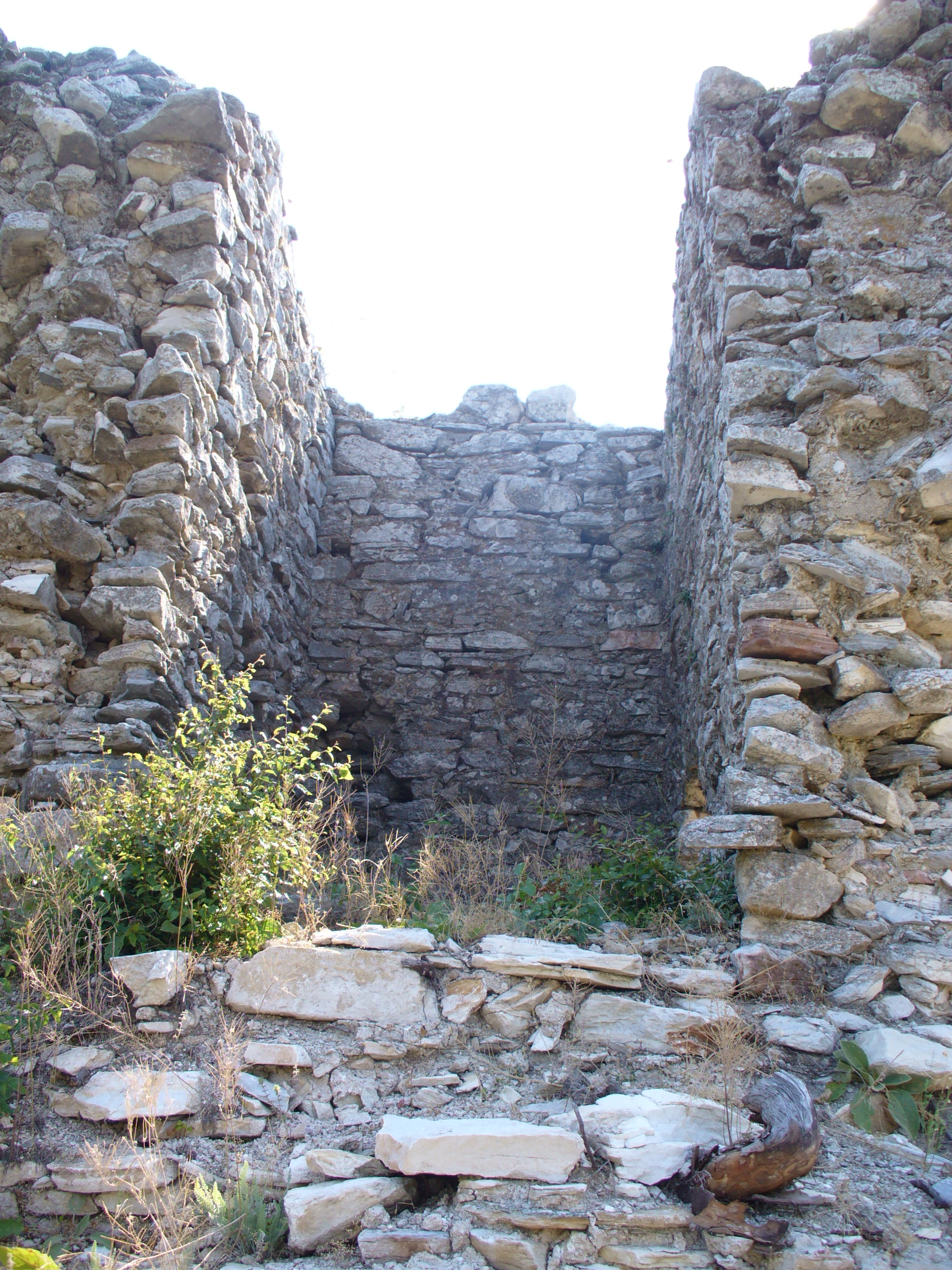
Tower

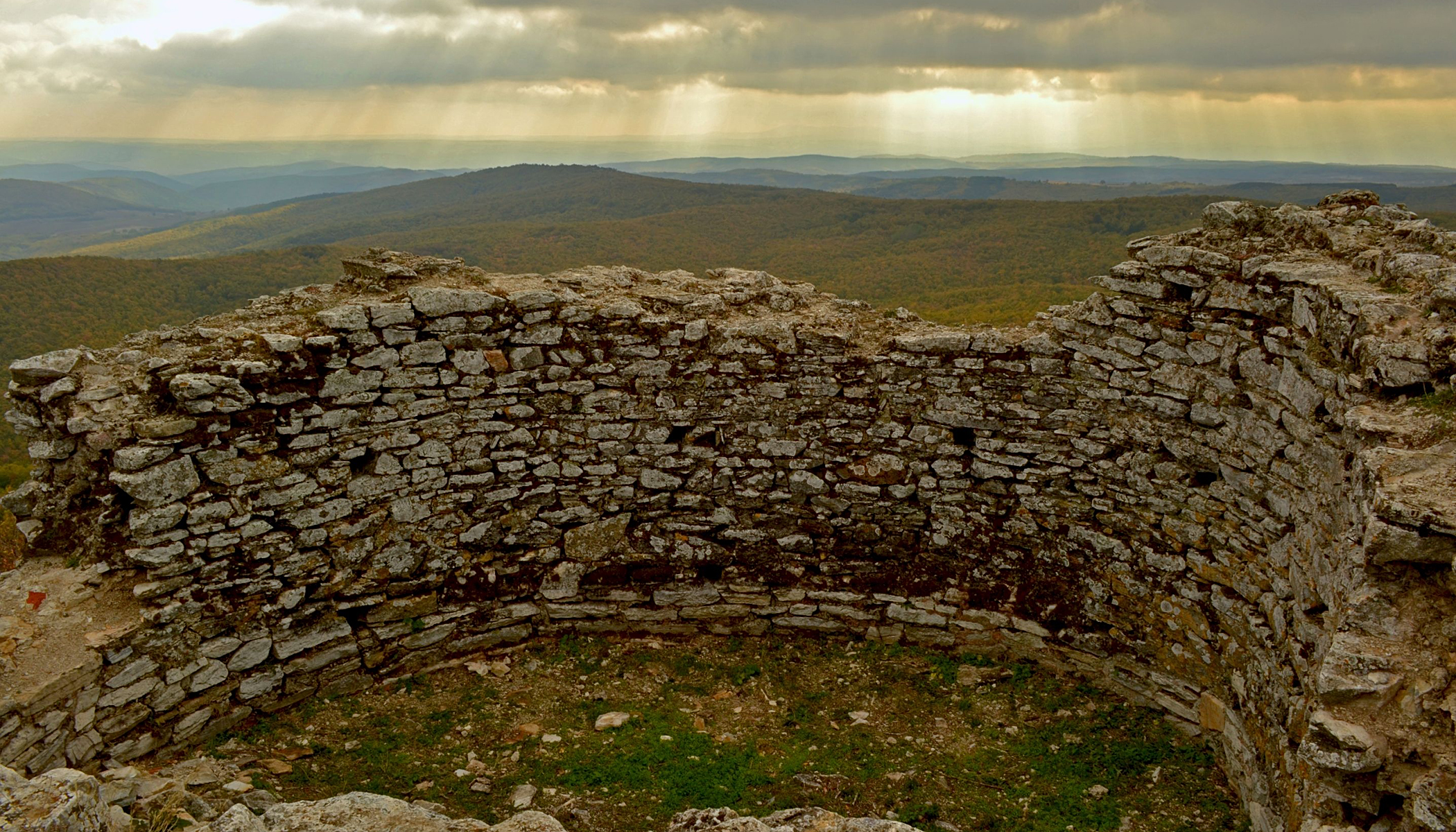

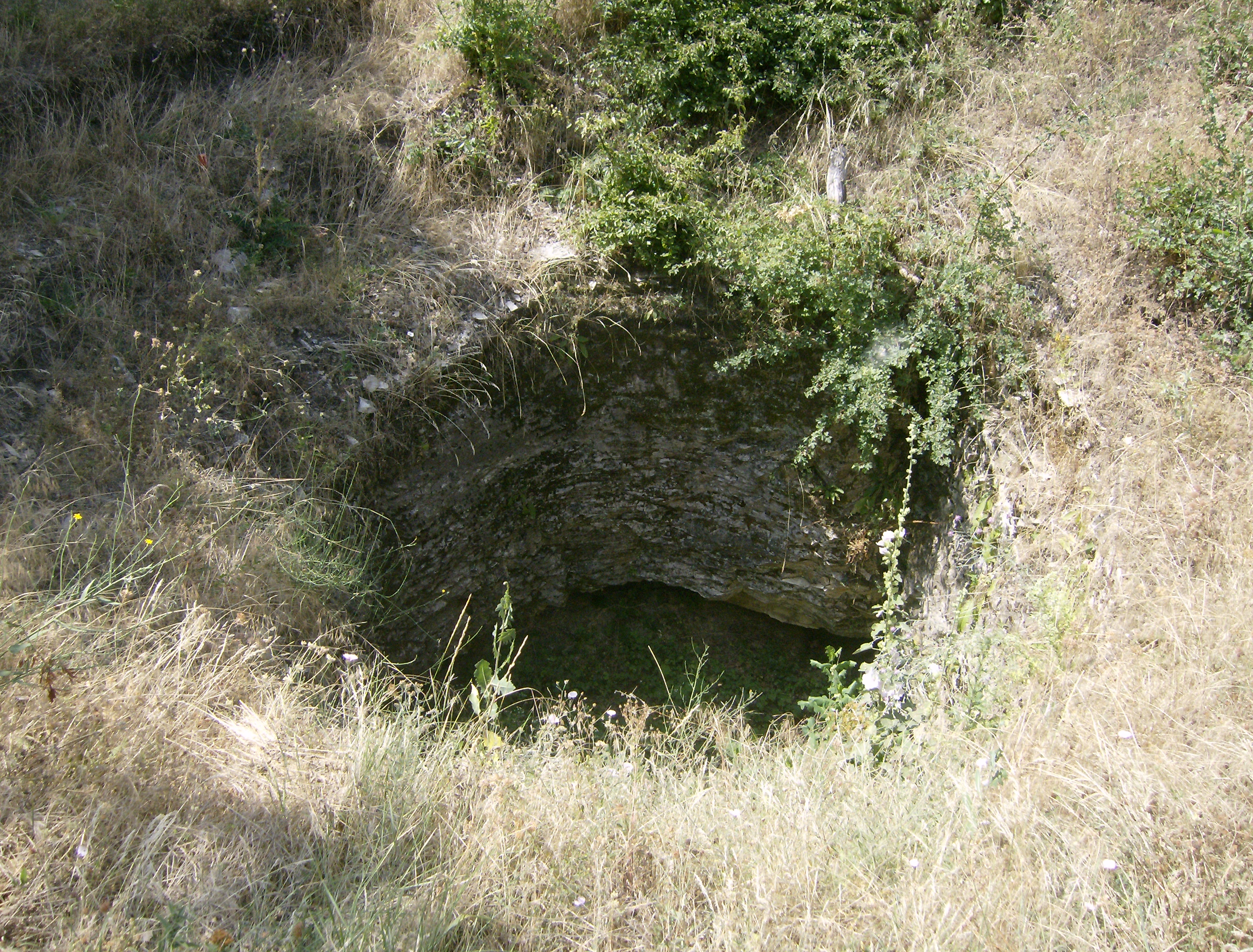
Reservoir

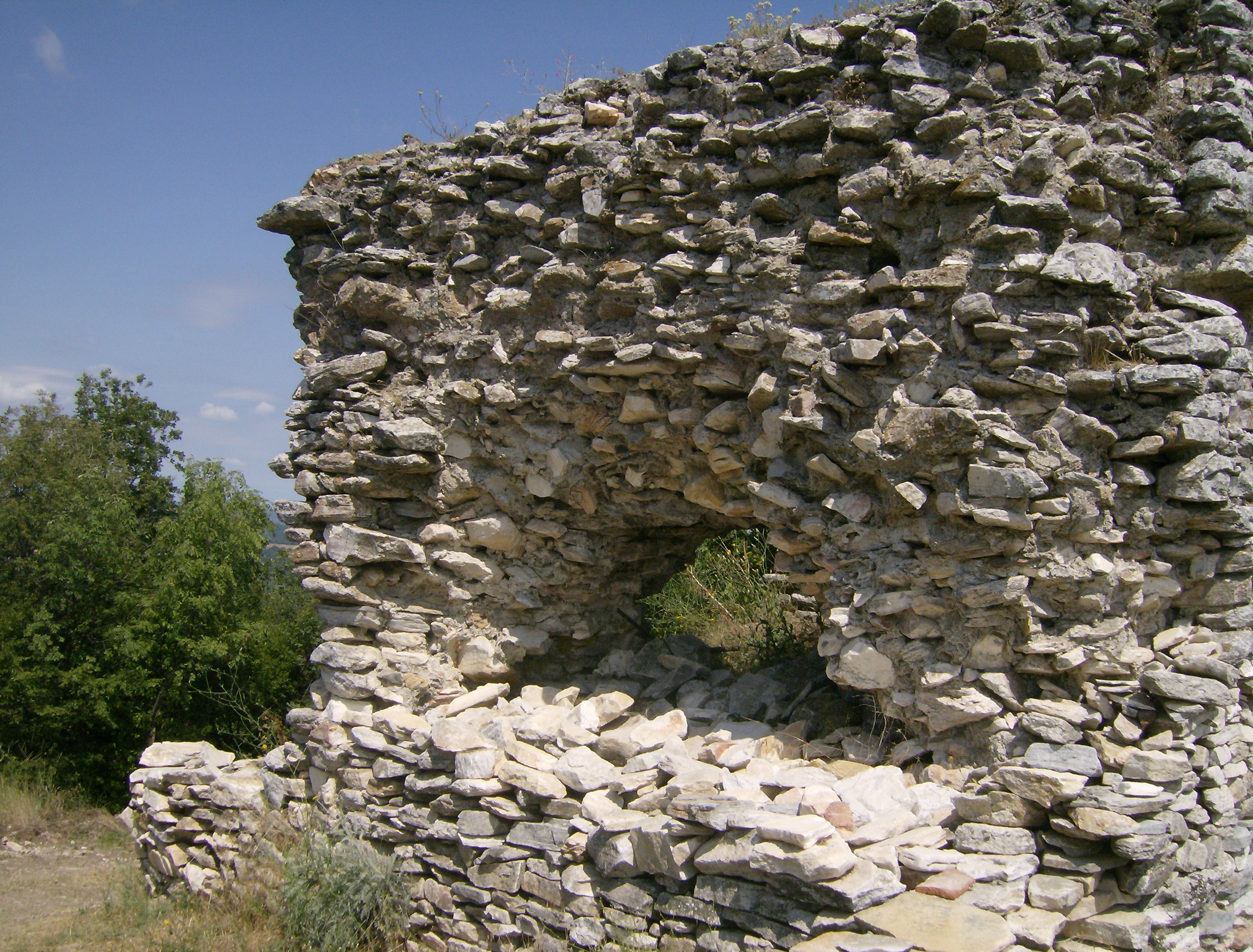
Fortress wall

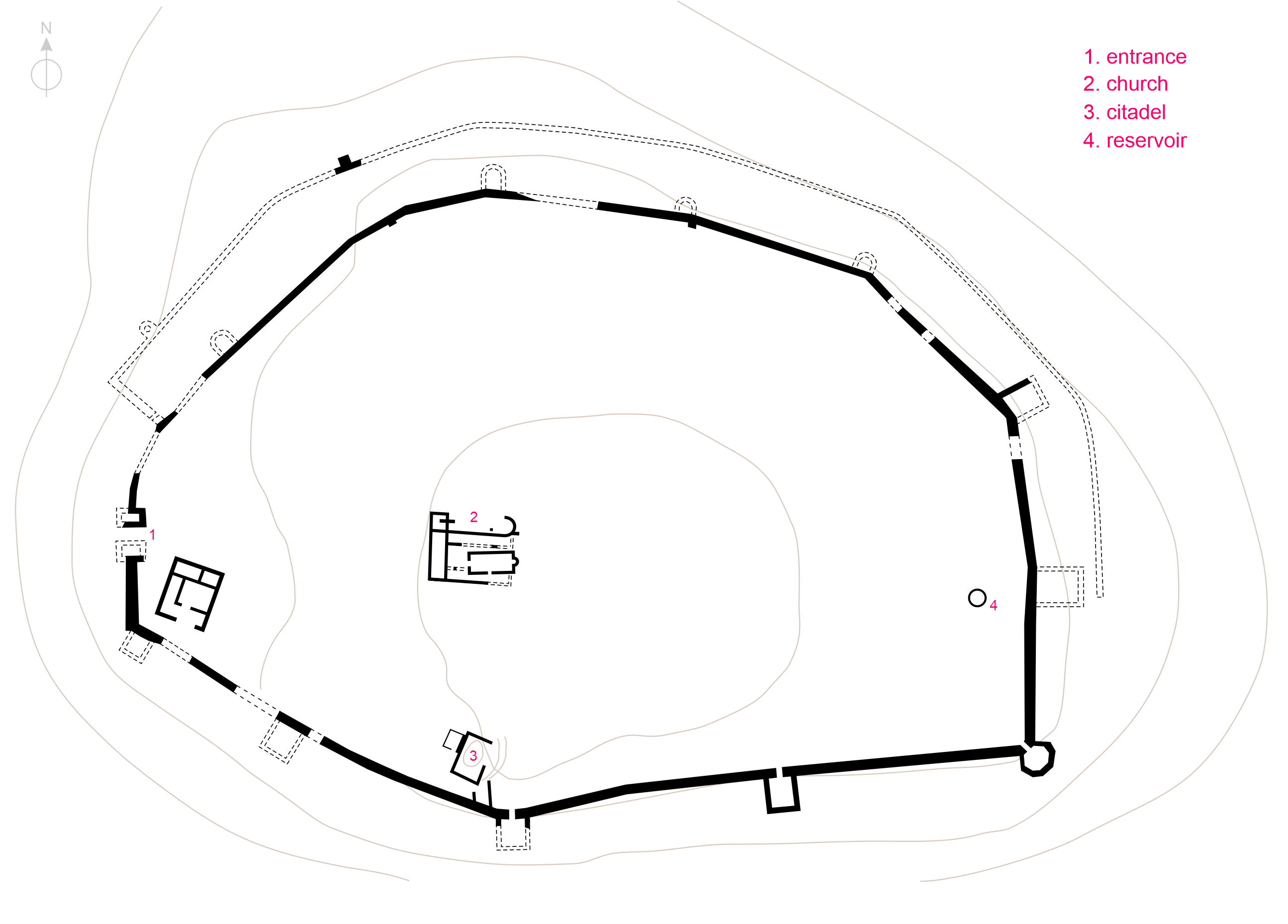
Fortress Plan
