= Stambolovo, Haskovo Province =

Stambolovo Стамболово
- Location of Stambolovo
- Coordinates: 41°46′N 25°39′E
- Country: Bulgaria
- Provinces (Oblast): Haskovo

Government
  - Mayor: Madzhid Mandadzha
- Elevation: 315 m (1,033 ft)

Population (2008)
  - Total: 648
- Time zone: UTC+2 (EET)
  - Summer (DST): UTC+3 (EEST)
- Postal Code: 6362
- Area code: 03721

Stambolovo (Bulgarian: Стамболово, pronounced [stɐmboˈɫɔvo]) is a village in central southern Bulgaria, part of Haskovo Province. It is the administrative centre of Stambolovo Municipality, which is located in the southwestern part of Haskovo Province. Stambolovo lies in the Eastern Rhodope Mountains, not far from the Upper Thracian Plain and 22 kilometres from the provincial capital of Haskovo.

The area has been continuously inhabited since antiquity, with Thracians, Romans, Byzantines, Bulgarians and Ottomans playing important roles in the area's history. Until 1906, the village was known as Eller; it was renamed after noted Bulgarian politician and Prime Minister of Bulgaria Stefan Stambolov (1854–1895).
