= Simeonovgrad =

Simeonovgrad Симеоновград
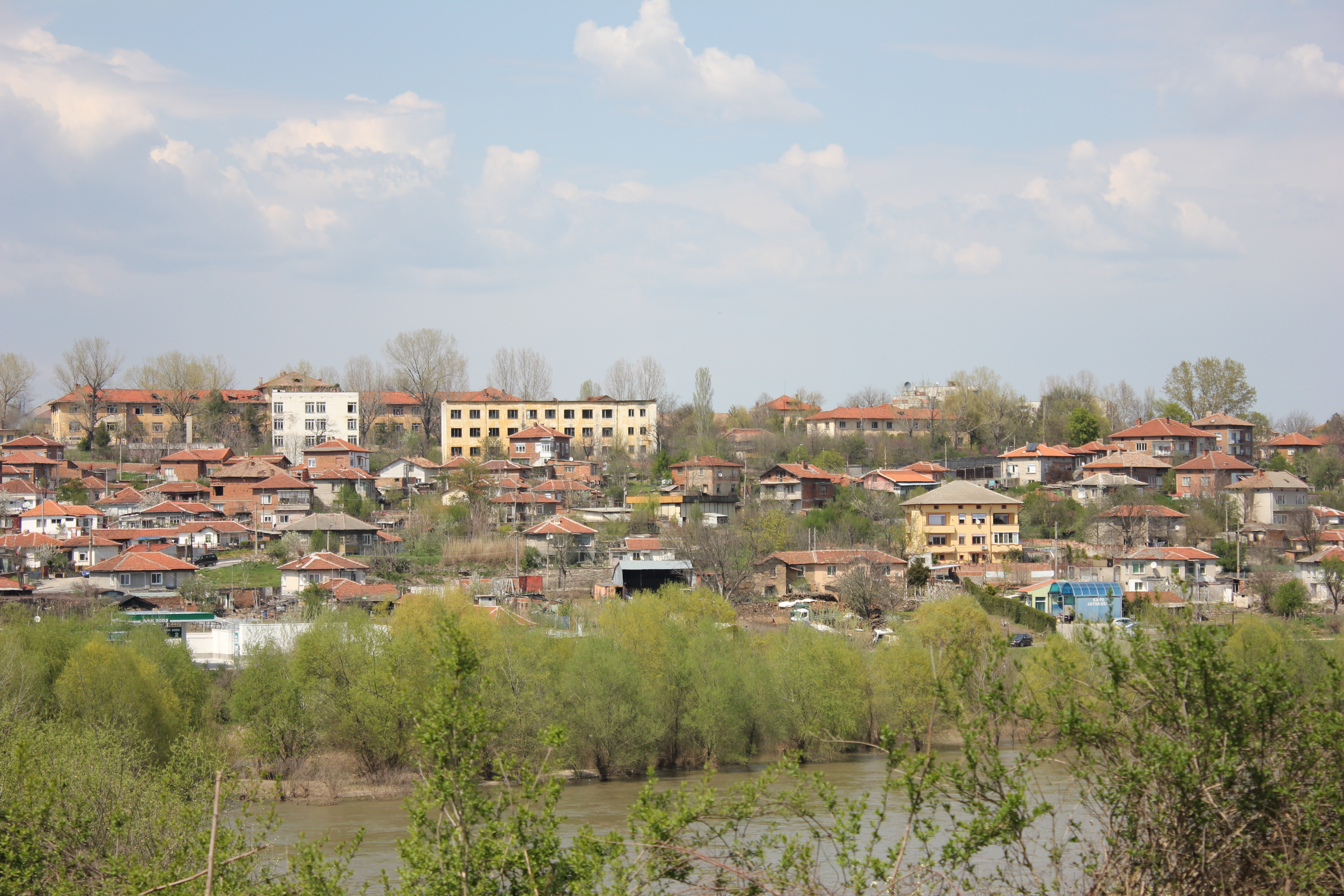

- Location of Simeonovgrad
- Coordinates: 42°2′N 25°50′E
- Country: Bulgaria
- Provinces (Oblast): Haskovo

Government
  - Mayor: Milena Rangelova

Area
  - Land: 77,159 km^{2} (29,791 sq mi)
- Elevation: 80 m (260 ft)

Population (2020)
  - Total: 7,808
- Time zone: UTC+2 (EET)
  - Summer (DST): UTC+3 (EEST)
- Postal Code: 6490
- Area code: 03781

Simeonovgrad (Bulgarian: Симеоновград [simɛˈɔnovˌɡrat]) is a town in the Haskovo Province of southern Bulgaria, located on both banks of the Maritsa River. Three bridges connect the town's two parts. It is the administrative centre of the homonymous Simeonovgrad Municipality.

== Landmarks ==
Near Simeonovgrad lie the ruins of the Ancient Roman and Byzantine fortress of Constantia (Greek: Κωνσταντία) from the Late Antiquity (4th century AD), which developed into one of the large towns of Northern Thrace until the beginning of the 13th century.

== Religion ==
The dominant religion is Eastern Orthodox Christianity. The town has two churches, the Church of the Most Holy Mother of God in the town centre and the Church of St Nicholas the Thaumaturge in the Zlati dol quarter.

== Etymology ==
The town's historical names were Seymen and later, during 1872–1929, Tarnovo–Seymen (Bulgarian: Търново-Сеймен) – named after the Ottoman-era seymen paramilitary units. For most of the Socialist period, between 1946–1981, the town was named Maritza (Bulgarian: Марица), after the river. The present name Simeonovgrad literally means "town of Simeon", a reference to the 10th-century Bulgarian king.

== Municipality ==
Simeonovgrad is also the seat of Simeonovgrad municipality (part of Haskovo Province), which includes the following 8 villages:

- Dryanovo
- Kalugerovo
- Konstantinovo
- Navasen
- Pyasachevo
- Svirkovo
- Troyan
- Tyanevo
