= Madzharovo =

Town in Haskovo oblast, Bulgaria

Coordinates: 41°38′N 25°52′E

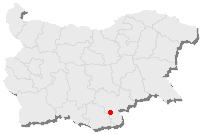
Location of Madzharovo in Bulgaria.

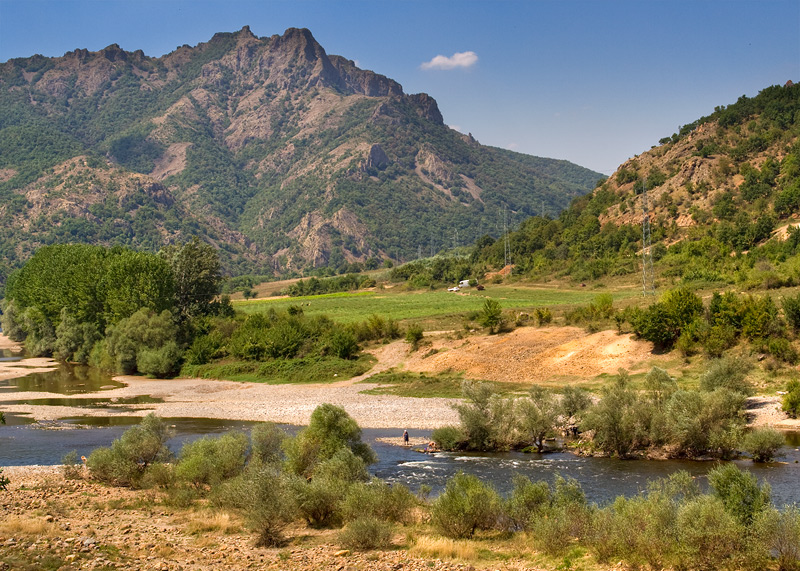
Madzharovo.

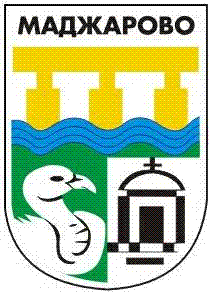
Coat of arms

Madzharovo (Bulgarian: Маджарово [mɐˈd͡ʒarovo], formerly Dupnitsa) is a small Bulgarian town in the Eastern Rhodopes, part of Haskovo Province, situated on the banks of the river Arda. It has a population of only 590, as of December 2009, making it one of the smallest in the country. The town is the administrative centre of the homonymous Madzharovo Municipality.

Madzharovo is where the only vulture reserve in Bulgaria is located, with three species inhabiting the area.

The town was named after the Thracian Bulgarian revolutionary Dimitar Madzharov (1882–1949). Its name before 1912 was Yatadzhik (Turkish: Yatacık or Yatakçık which was "small bed" in Turkish).

Madzharovo Point on Anvers Island in Antarctica is named after Madzharovo.
