= Stambolovo Municipality =

Stambolovo Municipality Община Стамболово
- Municipality
- Location within Bulgaria
- Coordinates: 41°46′N 25°39′E
- Country: Bulgaria
- Province: Haskovo
- Municipality: Stambolovo

Area
  - Total: 276.84 km^{2} (106.89 sq mi)

Population (1-Feb-2011)
  - Total: 5,934
  - Density: 21.43/km^{2} (55.52/sq mi)
- Time zone: UTC+2 (EET)
  - Summer (DST): UTC+3 (EEST)
- Website: www.stambolovo.org

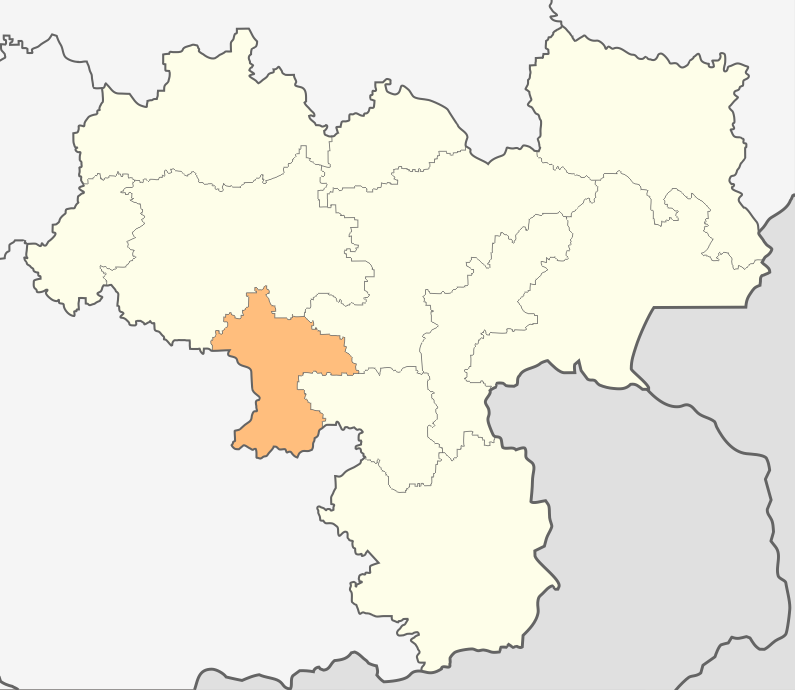
Stambolovo municipality within Haskovo Province

Stambolovo Municipality is a municipality in Haskovo Province, Bulgaria. The administrative centre is Stambolovo.

== Demography ==
=== Religion ===
According to the latest Bulgarian census of 2011, the religious composition, among those who answered the optional question on religious identification, was the following:

Religious composition of Stambolovo Municipality
Orthodox Christianity	25.8%
Catholicism	0.0%
Protestantism	0.4%
Islam	71.4%
No religion	0.6%
Prefer not to answer, others and indefinable	1.8%
