= Ivaylovgrad =

- Location of Ivaylovgrad
- Coordinates: 41°32′N 26°8′E
- Country: Bulgaria
- Provinces (Oblast): Haskovo

Government
  - Mayor: Diqna Ovcharova
- Elevation: 104 m (341 ft)

Population (2022-09-15).
  - Total: 3,132
- Time zone: UTC+2 (EET)
  - Summer (DST): UTC+3 (EEST)
- Postal Code: 6570
- Area code: 03661

Ivaylovgrad (Bulgarian: Ивайловград, "city of Ivaylo", Greek: Ορτάκιοϊ, Turkish :Ortaköy, "Middle Village") is a town in Haskovo Province in the south of Bulgaria set near the river Arda in the easternmost part of the Rhodope Mountains, and is the administrative centre of the homonymous Ivaylovgrad Municipality. The border with Evros, Greece is around two miles from the town centre.

== History ==
Byzantine eparchial lists from the 9th-10th centuries mention a bishop's centre by the name of Lyutitsa on the site of present-day Ivaylovgrad. According to John VI Kantakouzenos (1347–1354), his infantry reached the fortress in 1342–1343. The settlement was destroyed by the Ottoman Turks during their invasion of the Balkans in the 14th-15th century.

Information about the town during the Ottoman rule of Bulgaria is scarce, but it was the centre of a kaza under the name of Ortaköy in Edirne Province. Much of the Bulgarian population moved from the region due to organized robberies and internecine wars in the empire.

Despite the Liberation of Bulgaria in 1878 and the Unification in 1886, the town remained a part of the Ottoman Empire until the Balkan Wars in 1912–1913 and suffered greatly from bashi-bazouk attacks.

== Landmarks ==
Landmarks in Ivaylovgrad and the surrounding area include the Ivaylovgrad Reservoir, the 2nd-3rd century Roman Villa Armira, the medieval Byzantine and Bulgarian fortress Lyutitsa, the 16th-century bridge Aterenski, as well as a number of ancient Thracian sites, and 19th-century churches.

== Notable people ==
- Angelos Pimenidis (1904–1968), Greek popular figure and historian
- Ivajlo Balabanov (1945–2021), poet
- Georgi Georgiev (born 1924), actor
- Petia (born 1978), singer

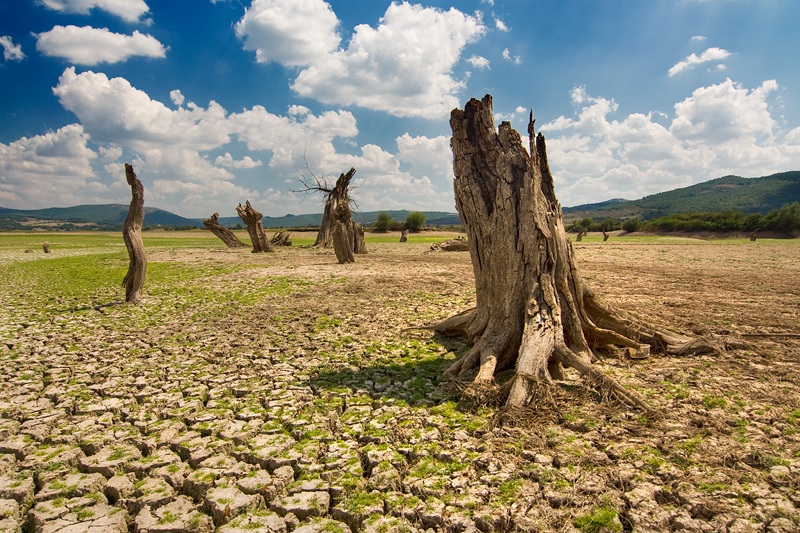
Ivaylovgrad Reservoir during the 2007 Bulgarian heat wave
