= Haskovo Province =

Province in southern Bulgaria

Coordinates: 41°50′N 25°55′E

Haskovo Област Хасково
- Province
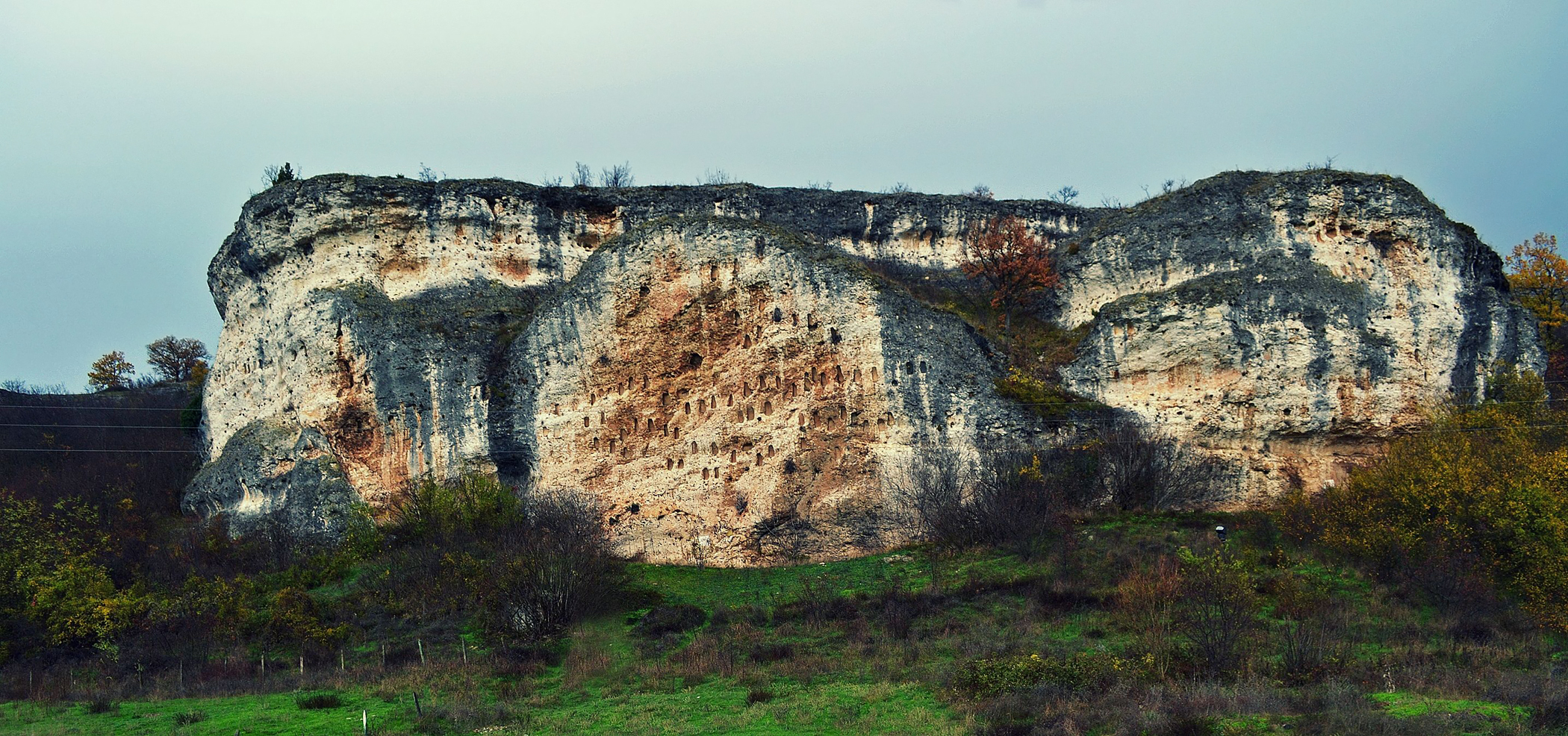
- Kovan Kaya Rock

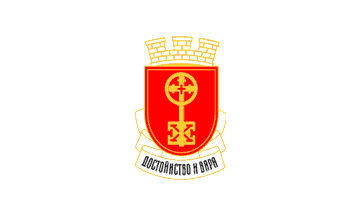
- Flag

- Location of Haskovo in Bulgaria
- Country: Bulgaria
- Capital: Haskovo
- Municipalities: 11

Government
  - Governor: Stanislav Dechev

Area
  - Total: 5,533.29 km^{2} (2,136.42 sq mi)

Population (December 2022)
  - Total: 207,439
  - Density: 37.4893/km^{2} (97.0968/sq mi)
- Time zone: UTC+2 (EET)
  - Summer (DST): UTC+3 (EEST)
- License plate: X
- Website: hs.government.bg

Haskovo Province (Bulgarian: Област Хасково, romanized: Oblast Haskovo; former name Haskovo okrug) is a province in southern Bulgaria, neighbouring Greece and Turkey to the southeast, comprising parts of the Thracian valley along the river Maritsa. It is named after its administrative and industrial centre: the city of Haskovo. The province has a territory of 5,533.3 km^{2} (2,136.4 sq mi) that is divided into 11 municipalities with a total population, as of December 2009, of 256,408 inhabitants.

== Municipalities ==
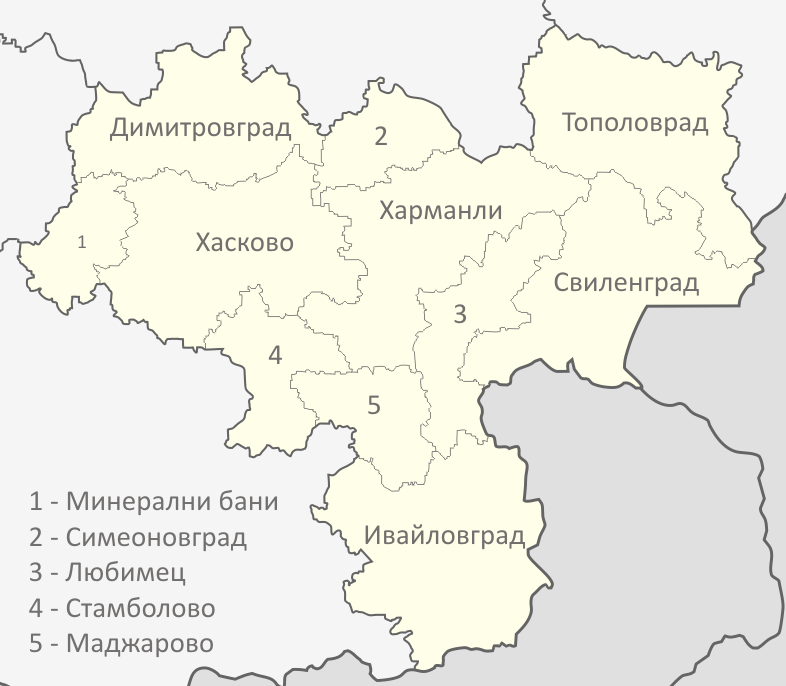
Municipalities of Haskovo province

The Haskovo province (Област, oblast) contains 11 municipalities (singular: община, obshtina - plural: Общини, obshtini). The following table shows the names of each municipality in English and Cyrillic, the main town or village (towns are shown in bold), and the population of each as of December 2009.

Municipality	Cyrillic	Pop.	Town/Village	Pop.
Dimitrovgrad	Димитровград	56,882	**Dimitrovgrad**	39,510
Harmanli	Харманли	25,711	**Harmanli**	18,557
Haskovo	Хасково	96,499	**Haskovo**	77,050
Ivaylovgrad	Ивайловград	6,761	**Ivaylovgrad**	3,756
Lyubimets	Любимец	10,400	**Lyubimets**	7,670
Madzharovo	Маджарово	1,800	**Madzharovo**	590
Mineralni Bani	Минерални бани	6,542	Mineralni Bani	1,303
Simeonovgrad	Симеоновград	9,371	**Simeonovgrad**	7,049
Stambolovo	Стамболово	6,122	Stambolovo	609
Svilengrad	Свиленград	24,142	**Svilengrad**	18,132
Topolovgrad	Тополовград	12,178	**Topolovgrad**	5,730

== Demographics ==
Historical population
Year	Pop.	±%
1946	235,248	—
1956	272,100	+15.7%
1965	287,996	+5.8%
1975	330,132	+14.6%
1985	334,584	+1.3%
1992	306,058	−8.5%
2001	277,478	−9.3%
2011	246,238	−11.3%
2021	211,565	−14.1%
Source: pop-stat.mashke.org

The Haskovo had a population of 277,483 (277,478 also given) according to a 2001 census, of which 48.9% were male and 51.1% were female.

As of the end of 2009, the population of the province, announced by the Bulgarian National Statistical Institute, numbered 256,408 of which 25.8% are inhabitants aged over 60 years.

=== Ethnic groups ===
Ethnic groups in Haskovo Province (2011 census)
Ethnic group	Percentage
Bulgarians	79.4%
Turks	12.5%
Romani	7.0%
others and indefinable	1.1%

Total population (2011 census): 246,238
Ethnic groups (2011 census): Identified themselves: 227,382 persons:

- Bulgarians: 180,541 (79.40%)
- Turks: 28,444 (12.50%)
- Romani: 15,889 (6.99%)
- Others and indefinable: 2,508 (1.10%)

A further 20,000 persons in Haskovo Province did not declare their ethnic group at the 2011 census.

=== Religion ===
Religious adherence in the province according to 2001 census:

Census 2001
religious adherence	population	%
Orthodox Christians	227,593	82.03%
Muslims	33,780	12.17%
Protestants	1,846	0.67%
Roman Catholics	426	0.15%
Other	1,833	0.66%
Religion not mentioned	12,000	4.32%
total	277,478	100%

== See also ==
- Provinces of Bulgaria
- Municipalities of Bulgaria
- List of cities and towns in Bulgaria
- List of villages in Haskovo Province
