= Totleben (disambiguation) =

Totleben is a German-Baltic noble family. Totleben may also refer to:

== People ==
- Eduard Totleben, a Baltic German military engineer and Imperial Russian Army general
- John Totleben, an American illustrator

== Places ==
- Totleben, Bulgaria, a village in Bulgaria

== See also ==
- Tottleben (disambiguation)
