= Kamenets, Pleven Province =

Kamenets Каменец
- Village
- Location within Bulgaria
- Coordinates: 43.3399°N 25.0038°E
- Country: Bulgaria
- Province: Pleven Province
- Municipality: Pordim
- Elevation: 117 m (384 ft)
- Time zone: UTC+2 (EET)
  - Summer (DST): UTC+3 (EEST)

Kamenets (Bulgarian: Каменец) is a village in Pleven Province of Northern Bulgaria.

As of 2021, the population stood at 320 residents, with an almost even amount of males and females at 161 males and 159 females.

The village's main streets are paved and illuminated, with water and electricity systems in place, and is connected to neighboring villages by both bus and rail. Mobile network coverage is available to all major operators. The village also features a small airport with one runway: 9/27. The airport is currently inactive and requires prior permission for flight planning. The airport also doe not publish METAR, with the nearest weather station located at Dolna Mitropoliya Air Base which is located roughly 450km (279 miles) away.

Local amenities include a town hall, post office, community center with a choir, kindergarten, store, and restaurant. Health services are offered by a general practitioner and a dentist. Education requires travel to the neighboring village of Odarne, while the nearest hospital is situated in Pleven. Many women in the village are employed at a private apparel workshop.

== Landmarks ==
In Pleven, about 30 km (18.6 miles) away, visitors can find three sites listed among Bulgaria's 100 Tourist Sites: the Pleven Panorama, the Regional History Museum, and the Mausoleum-Chapel of St. George Pobedonosets. Nearby attractions also include Kaylaka Park and the Wine Museum.

The village church, constructed approximately 130 years ago, was fully renovated in 2009. The surrounding area has revealed thirteen mounds, some of which contain Thracian tombs and funerary urns. An ancient Thracian tombstone uncovered in 1908 is now displayed at the Archaeological Museum in Sofia.
