= Brenitsa, Pleven Province =

Village in Bulgaria

Coordinates: 43°25′N 24°08′E

Brenitsa (Bulgarian: Бреница [brɛˈnit͡sɐ]) is a village in Northern Bulgaria. It is in Knezha Municipality, Pleven Province.

Brenitza is in northwestern Bulgaria in the Danubian Plain. It is 40 km (25 mi) south of the Danube River, 7 km (4.3 mi) west of the Iskar River, 17 km (11 mi) east of Byala Slatina, 25 km (16 mi) from Cherven Bryag, and 8 km (5.0 mi) southeast of Knezha.
