= Nikopol Municipality =

Nikopol Municipality Община Никопол
- Municipality
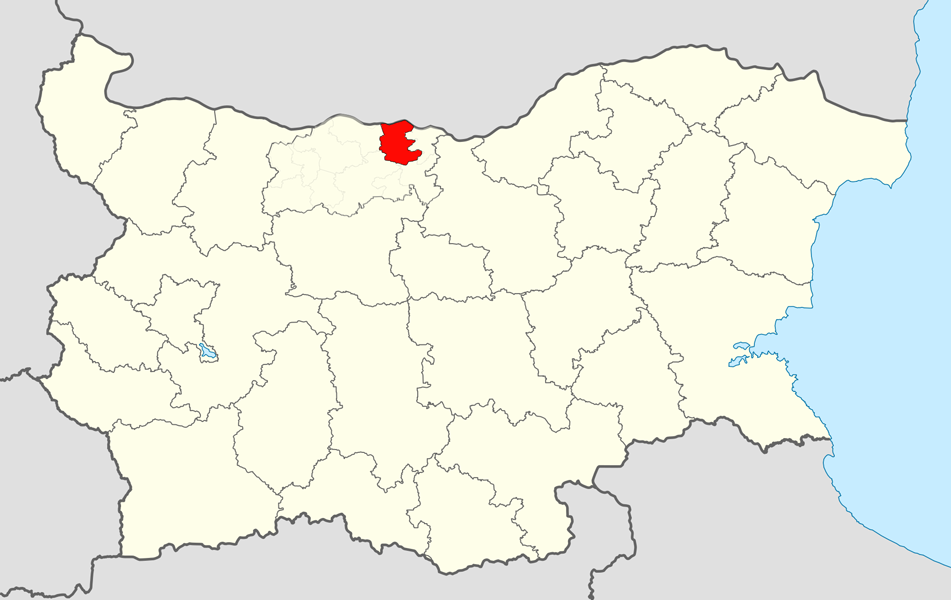
- Nikopol Municipality within Bulgaria and Pleven Province.
- Coordinates: 43°35′N 24°55′E
- Country: Bulgaria
- Province (Oblast): Pleven
- Admin. centre (Obshtinski tsentar): Nikopol

Area
  - Total: 415.9 km^{2} (160.6 sq mi)

Population (December 2009)
  - Total: 10,602
  - Density: 25.49/km^{2} (66.02/sq mi)
- Time zone: UTC+2 (EET)
  - Summer (DST): UTC+3 (EEST)

Nikopol Municipality (Bulgarian: Община Никопол) is a municipality (obshtina) in the northern part of Pleven Province, in northern Bulgaria. It is named after its administrative centre - the town of Nikopol. The municipality embraces a territory of 415.9 km^{2} (160.6 sq mi) with a population, as of December 2009, of 10,602 inhabitants.

Its northern border is by the Danube River, bordering with Turnu Măgurele municipality of Romania. The municipality also borders with Belene Municipality on the East, Livski and Pordim municipalities on the South, Pleven municipality on the Southwest and Gulyantsi Municipality on the West.

Besides the Danube, which defines the hydrography of the area, the Osam river and some minor rivers flow within the municipality.

There are plans to develop common cultural tourism program that encompass the Nikopol and Turnu Măgurele municipalities. Unlike Turnu Măgurele, Nikopol municipality has poorly developed tourism infrastructure.

== Settlements ==
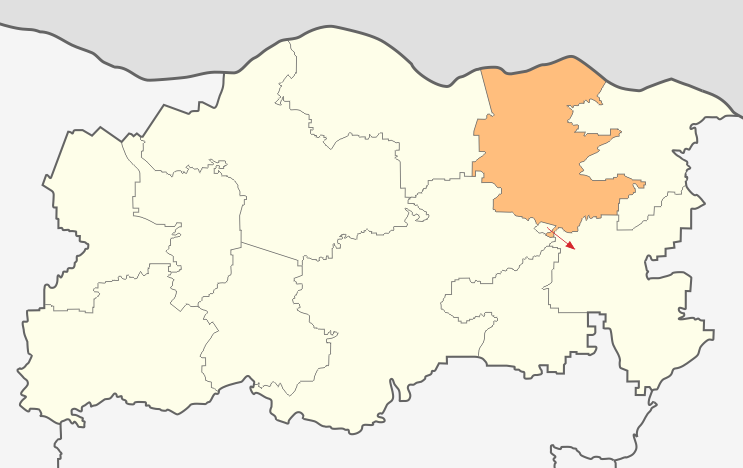
Nikopol Municipality within Pleven Province

(towns are shown in bold):

Town/Village	Cyrillic	Population (2011)
**Nikopol**	**Никопол**	3,186
Asenovo	Асеново	290
Batsova mahala	Бацова махала	471
Vabel	Въбел	740
Debovo	Дебово	588
Dragash voyvoda	Драгаш войвода	573
Evlogievo	Евлогиево	104
Zhernov	Жернов	100
Lozitsa	Лозица	264
Lyubenovo	Любеново	209
Muselievo	Муселиево	762
Novachene	Новачене	1,187
Sanadinovo	Санадиново	356
Cherkovitsa	Черковица	466
Total		9,296

== Demography ==
The following table shows the change of the population during the last four decades.

Nikopol Municipality
**Year**	1975	1985	1992	**2001**	2005	2007	2009	**2011**
**Population**	20,812	17,806	15,840	13,656	11,909	11,264	10,602	...
Sources: Census 2001, Census 2011, „pop-stat.mashke.org“,

=== Vital statistics ===
The municipality of Nikopol has a low birth rate and a high death rate.

	Population	Live births	Deaths	Natural growth	Birth rate (‰)	Death rate (‰)	Natural growth rate (‰)
2000	14,254	103	317	-214	7.2	22.2	-15.0
2001	13,400	100	355	-255	7.5	26.5	-19.0
2002	12,983	96	337	-241	7.4	26.0	-18.6
2003	12,662	86	294	-208	6.8	23.2	-16.4
2004	12,296	90	244	-154	7.3	19.8	-12.5
2005	11,909	90	290	-200	7.6	24.4	-16.8
2006	11,545	73	293	-220	6.3	25.4	-19.1
2007	11,264	66	292	-226	5.9	25.9	-20.1
2008	10,897	88	270	-182	8.1	24.8	-16.1
2009	10,602	92	266	-174	8.7	25.1	-16.4
2010	10,366	65	230	-165	6.3	22.2	-15.9
2011	9,205	76	245	-169	8.3	26.6	-18.4
2012	9,019	71	213	-142	7.9	23.6	-15.7
2013	8,835	74	214	-140	8.4	24.2	-15.8
2014	8,684	59	224	-165	6.8	25.8	-19.0
2015	8,538	54	248	-194	6.3	29.0	-22.7
2016	8,332	61	231	-170	7.3	27.7	-20.4
2017	8,123	66	214	-148	8.1	26.3	-18.2
2018	7,925	56	197	-141	7.1	24.9	-17.8

=== Religion ===
According to the latest Bulgarian census of 2011, the religious composition, among those who answered the optional question on religious identification, was the following:

Religious composition of Nikopol Municipality
Orthodox Christianity	64.5%
Catholicism	2.8%
Protestantism	0.3%
Islam	15.0%
No religion	8.4%
Prefer not to answer, others and indefinable	9.0%

== See also ==
- Provinces of Bulgaria
- Municipalities of Bulgaria
- List of cities and towns in Bulgaria
