= Totleben =

Tottleben, Totleben Тоттле́бен, Тотле́бен
- Coat of arms of Totleben family

Origin
- Language: Middle German
- Meaning: from Tottleben
- Region of origin: Tottleben, Thuringia

Other names
- Variant forms: von Tottleben, von Totleben

The Totleben (initially Tottleben; Russian: Тоттле́бен, Тотле́бен) family is a German-Baltic noble family with its origins at Gera, Thuringia, Germany. Members of the family occupied important positions in the Duchy of Courland and later throughout the Russian Empire. On 9 October 1879 they were granted the title of Count in Russia.

== Notable members ==
- Count Gottlob Curt Heinrich von Tottleben, Lord at Tottleben, Zeippau, and Hansdorf in the Duchy of Sagan (German: Gottlob Heinrich Graf von Tottleben, Herr auf Tottleben, Zeippau und Hansdorf im Saganschen; 1715, Tottleben – 1773), Saxony-born Russian general
- Count Eduard Totleben (Russian: Эдуа́рд Ива́нович Тотле́бен; 1818, Jelgava – 1884, Bad Soden), Russian general
- John Totleben (born 1958, Erie, Pennsylvania), American illustrator

== See also ==
- Totleben (Bulgarian: Тотлебен), a village in Pleven Province, Bulgaria, named after Eduard Totleben
