= Levski, Pleven Province =

Levski Левски
- Town
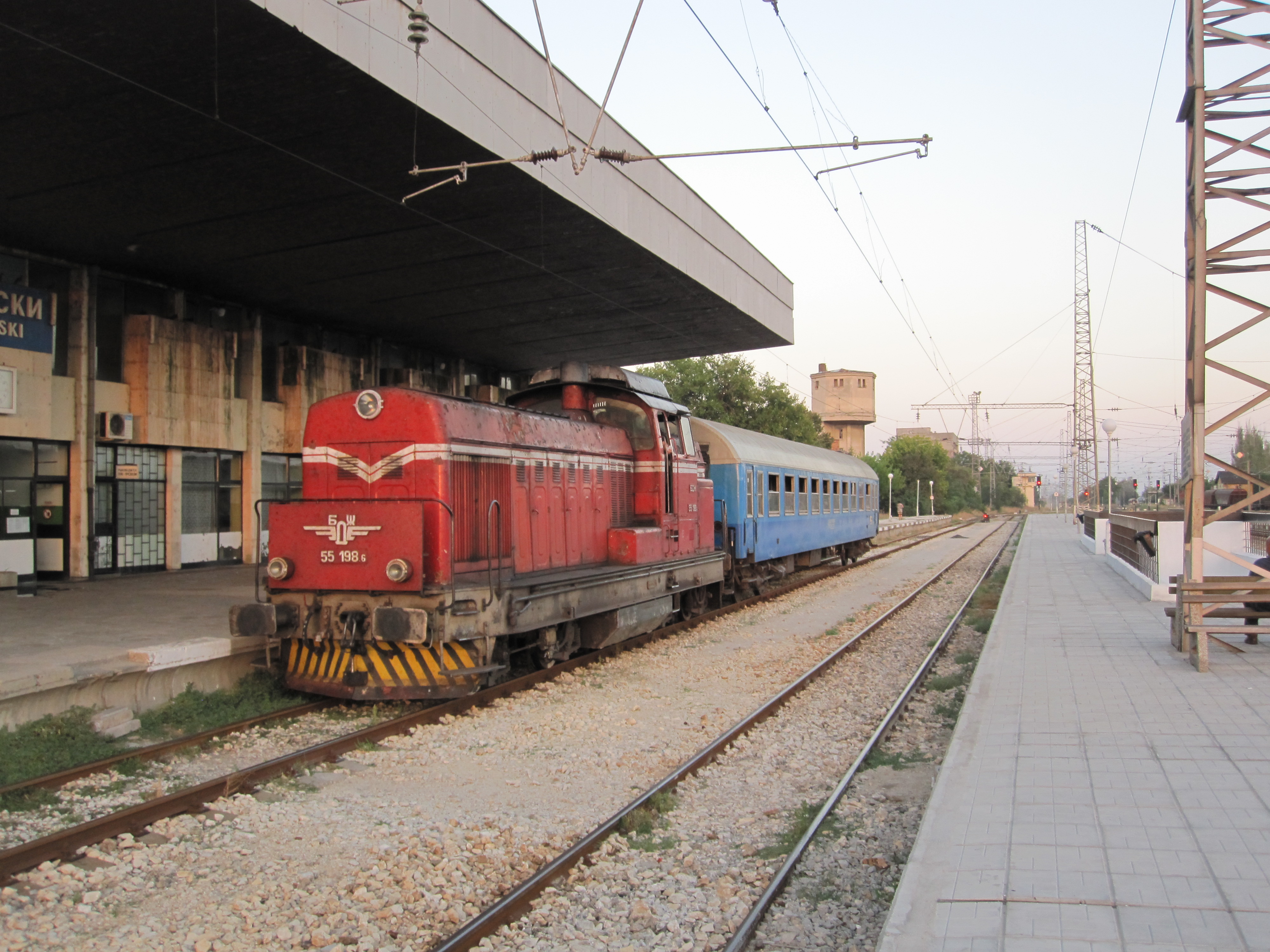

- Coat of arms

- Location of Levski (town) in Pleven Province
- Coordinates: 43°22′N 25°08′E
- Country: Bulgaria
- Province (Oblast): Pleven
- Municipality: Levski

Government
  - Mayor: Liubka Aleksanrova (BSP)
- Elevation: 70 m (230 ft)

Population (2020)
  - Total: 10,317
- Time zone: UTC+2 (EET)
  - Summer (DST): UTC+3 (EEST)
- Postal Code: 5900
- Area code: 0650

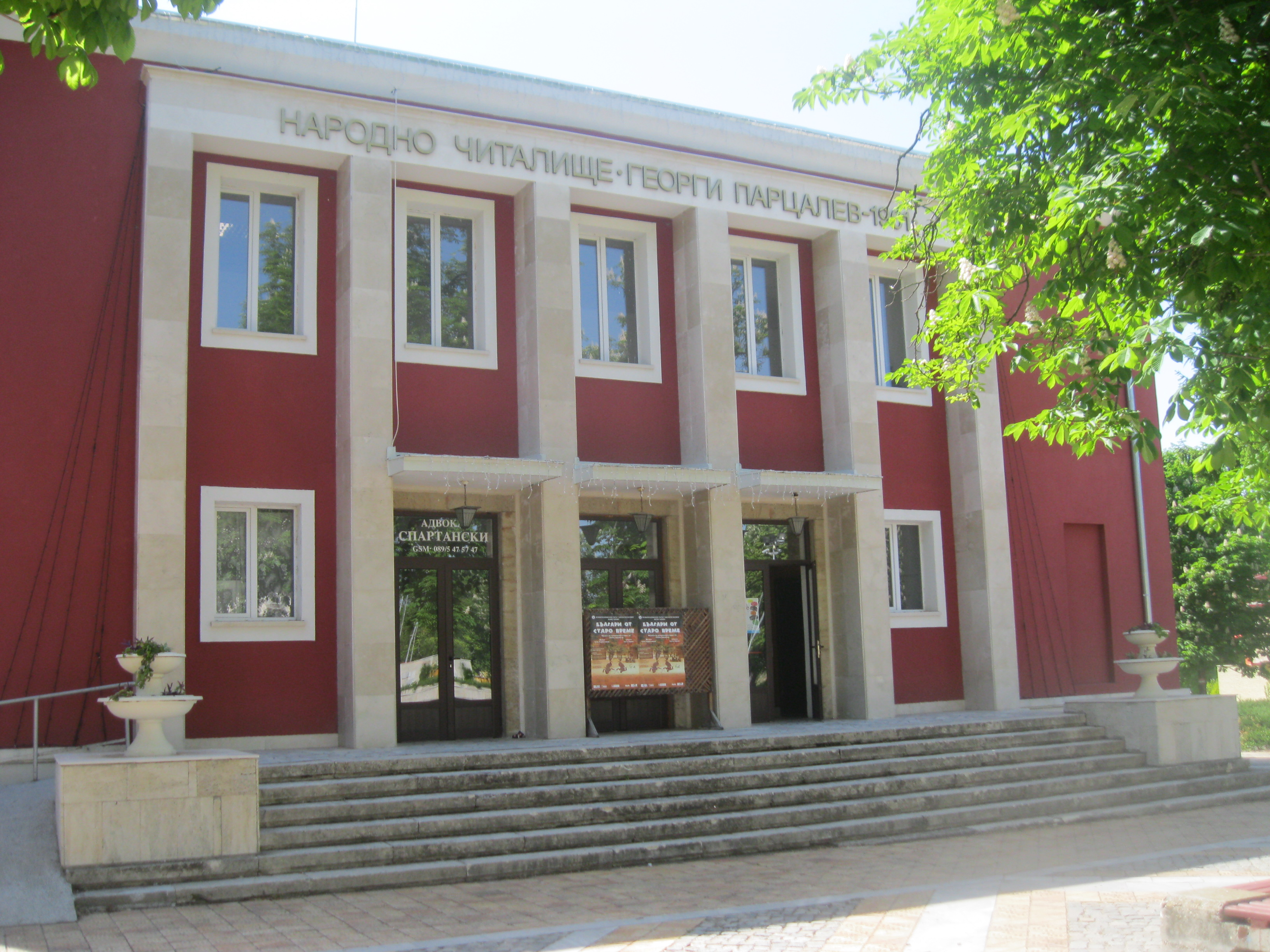
"Georgi Partsalev" chitalishte (cultural and community centre)

Levski (Bulgarian: Левски [ˈlɛfski]) is a town in central northern Bulgaria, an administrative center of the homonymous Levski Municipality in the very southeast of Pleven Province.

== Geography ==
Levski Municipality is located on a territory of 414 km2 in the Danubian plain, Tuchenishko-Dolnoosomski region. The predominant relief in the municipality is the plain relief – the town of Levski is located at about 70 m above sea level. The distance to the regional town of Pleven is 50 km. The climate is temperate continental.

== History ==
The old name of Levski (until 1897) is Karaagach (from Turkish – Black Elm). Today's Levski station before the Liberation from Ottoman rule was inhabited mainly by Turks. Some called it Turkish Karaach, unlike the village of Bulgarian Karaach, today's Totleben.

In 1880 there were 1,082 inhabitants in Turkish Karaach. Six years after the Liberation, in 1884 a primary school was opened, and in 1887 a Bulgarian church was built.

In 1881, the government of Dragan Tsankov proposed in the National Assembly to study the construction of the railway line Sofia – Danube. With a law of 15 February 1883, construction began. At that time the railway junction Levski station was also built.

The line was officially opened by Knyaz Ferdinand on 8 November 1899 with the starting station Sofia – Roman – Pleven – Gorna Oryahovitsa – Shumen – Varna.

The village of Karaach at that time was inconspicuous, covered in mud, the houses small and unstable. In no way could it be compared with the settlements close to it, such as Letnitsa, Alexandrovo and others.

In 1945, a year after the September 9 coup d'état, the village of Levski became the first village in Bulgaria to be declared a city by the communist authorities. OTKZS "Komuna" was founded in the city.

== Religion ==
The city and the municipality are inhabited by Orthodox, Catholics, Muslims, and Evangelicals. There is a Catholic parish "St. John XXIII" in the town, and in the municipality there are several Catholic villages (Malchika, Tranchovitsa).

== Economy ==
The town of Levski is a large transport hub – from the main line Sofia – Varna, here the trains make a connection to Troyan and Lovech, Svishtov. Two third-class, but very busy republican highways pass through the town – (in general as directions) – Svishtov – Levski – Lovech – Troyan and Nikopol – Levski – Pavlikeni – Veliko Tarnovo. 8 km north of Levski passes the first class road Sofia – (Ruse) – Varna. The route of the future Hemus highway will pass ten kilometers south of Levski.

The traditional for the Municipality of Levski, very well developed, food, machine building and light industry, experienced a difficult period after the entry of market relations in Bulgaria. Since about 2000, there has been a revival in the economy. The investments of both the local business and the external companies operating on the territory of the municipality are increasing.

ESMOS AD is a machine-building manufacturer specializing in plastic processing and recycling equipment. Based on the Balkan Peninsula, the company operates production facilities certified under ISO 9001:2008, ISO 14001:2004, and OHSAS 18001:2007, producing machinery for plastic separation and recycling.

The prosperous Bultrex Ltd. / sale and service of agricultural machinery / continues to expand its activity. There is investor interest in the construction of processing plants and other industries. It ceased its activities in 2012.

Opposite the station is "KIP" -Levski. This is an enterprise from the structure of the National Company "Railway Infrastructure". Established on 1 July 1977, during its 30-year history it has developed successfully as a metrological centre. Here is performed repair of devices from speedometer installation of locomotives, inspection of measuring instruments, production of spare parts for locomotives.

Assessing the advantages of the town of Levski as a location and communications, since 2008 a joint investment of Silvamash (Bulgaria) and the Swedish giant IKEA has been realized not far from the railway station.

== Culture ==
=== Institutions ===
- Community centre „Georgi Partsalev“
- Town's newspaper – „LEVSKI dnes“
- Community centre „Prosveta" – founded in 1901

=== Education ===
There are 5 education centres. Two high schools and three primary schools.

=== Landmarks ===
- Vasil Levski monument
- Old stone bridge – „Roman bridge“
- Forest park „Shavarna“
- Memorial plaque of Khan Kubrat with soil from his grave

=== Museums ===
- Museum house of Georgi Partsalev
- Small ethnographic museum to PGSS school Nikola Yonkov Vaptsarov

=== Events ===
- July 18 – City holiday
- Every Saturday – market day
- Last Saturday and Sunday in August – fair

== Notable people ==
- Georgi Partsalev – actor
- Vasil Marinov – writer and journalist
- Kamen Asenov – actor
- Nikola Nikolov – writer and journalist
- Todor Nikolov – academic and doctor
- Aneta Todorova – journalist and publisher
- Galya Topcheva – equestrian athlete
- Veselina Genovska – writer
- Krum Popov – mayor of Sofia (1892–1923)
- Doncho Tsonchev – writer
- Lyudmila Radkova – writer
- Vladimir Ivanov – doctor and public figure
- Ivan Ivanov – writer
- Iliya and Georgi Milanovi – footballers
- Grigor Vachkov – actor
- Mihail Genovski – jurist and politician
- Lilyana Rachkova – socialist labour hero
- Borislav Nikolov – engineer, entrepreneur
- Ana-Maria Yanakieva – singer
