= Tarakaniv fortress =

Fortress in Rivne Oblast, Ukraine

- Dubno Raion, Rivne Oblast in Ukraine
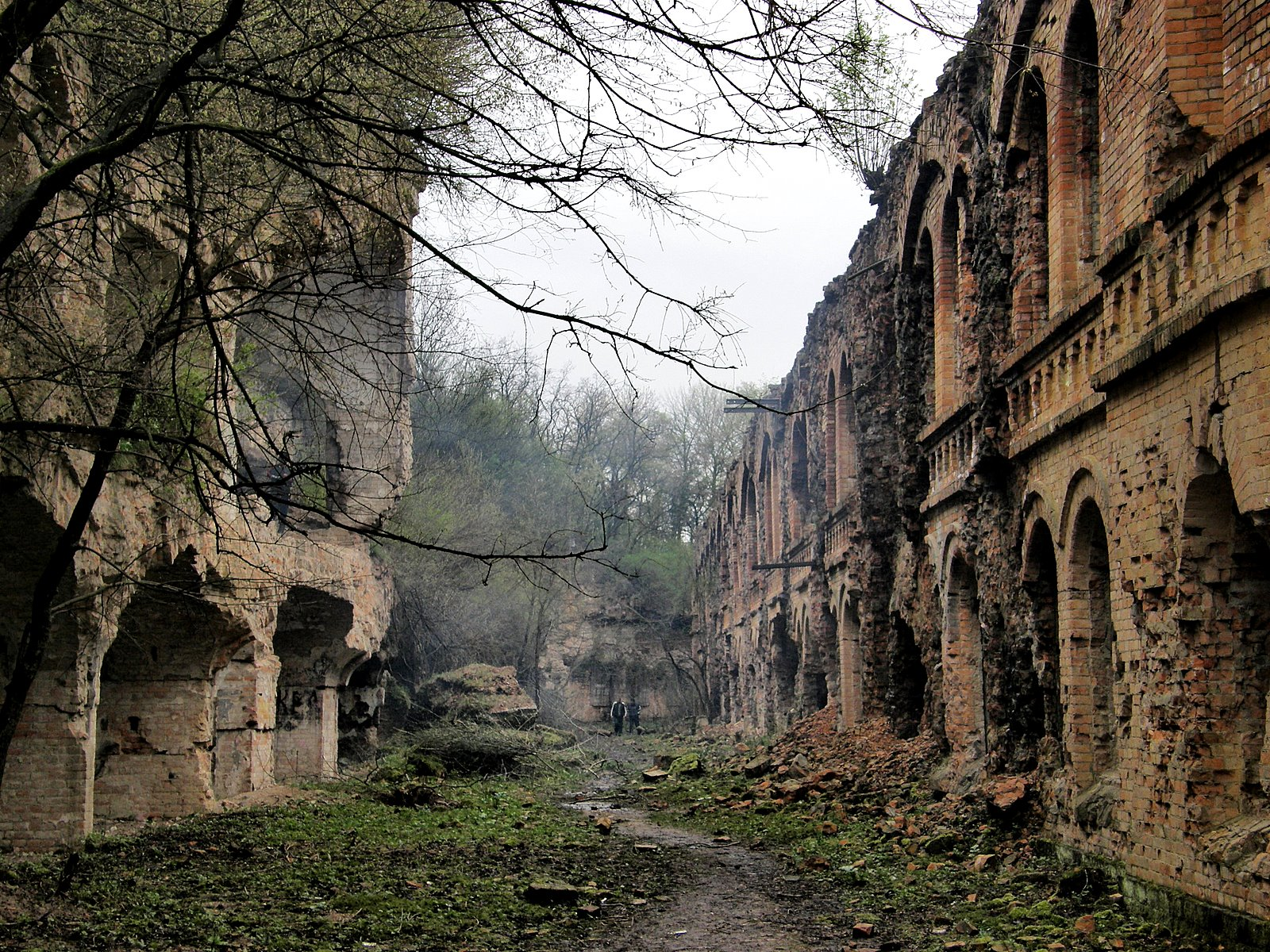

Site information
- Type: Fortress
- Open to the public: no (Note: As of 2021 access control wasn't enforced)

Location
- Location within Rivne Oblast
- Coordinates: 50°21′47″N 25°42′58″E
- Area: 40,000 square metres (4.0 ha)

Site history
- Built: 1860—1890
- Built by: Eduard Totleben (Russian Empire)
- Materials: stone, clay bricks, rubble, concrete
- Battles/wars: Brusilov offensive
- Events: World War I, Russian Civil War

Immovable Monument of Local Significance of Ukraine
- Official name: Форт (Fort)
- Type: Architecture
- Reference no.: 1028-Рв

Tarakaniv Fort (Ukrainian: Тараканівський форт), also known as Dubno fort (Форт-застава Дубно) is a 19th-century fortress located next to Tarakaniv village in the Dubno Raion of Rivne Oblast, Ukraine. It was commissioned and built by Alexander II of the Russian Empire and can be found next to Lviv-Kyiv Highway M06 on the right bank of the Ikva river. The fortress could accommodate up to 800 people.

== History ==
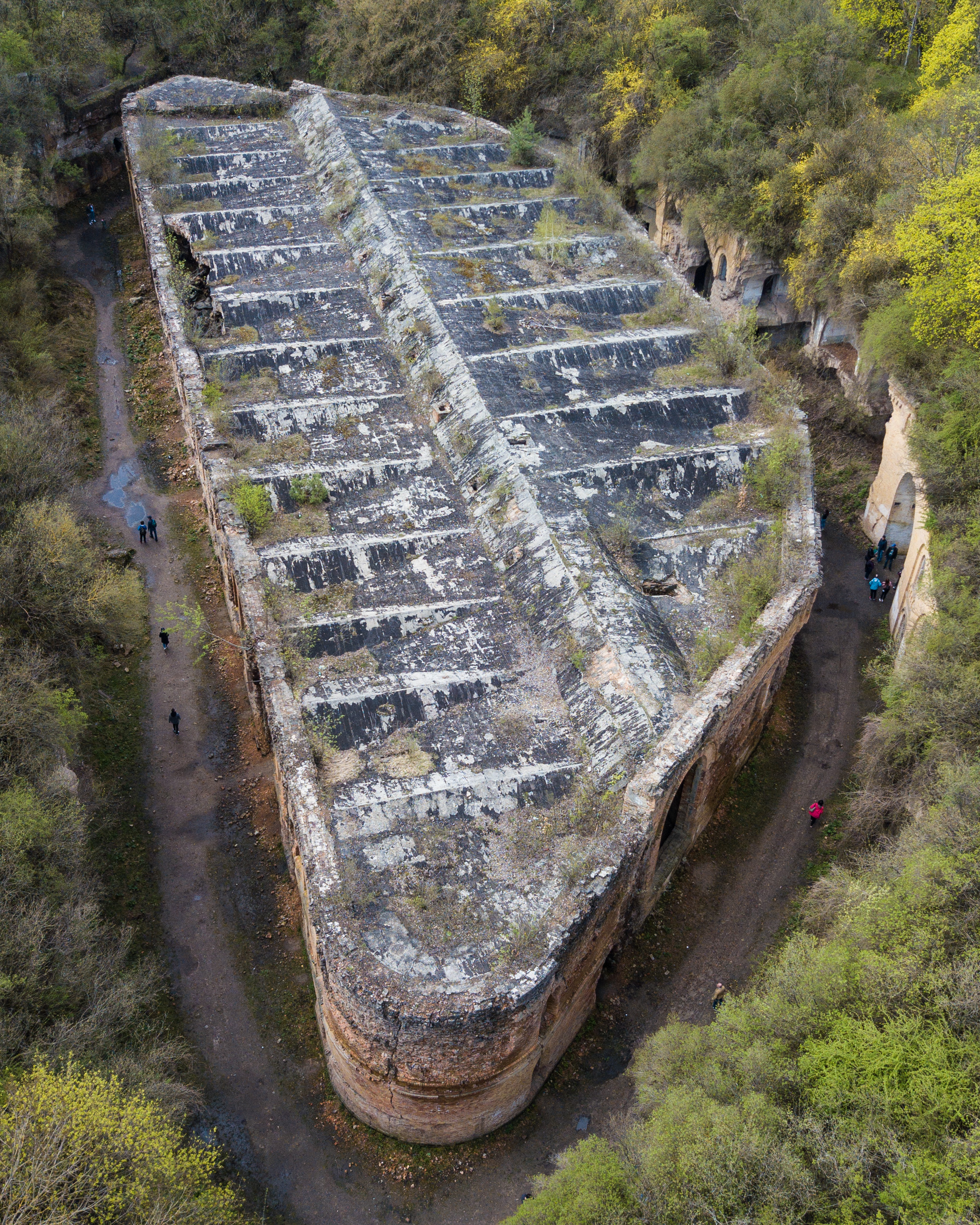
From above

=== Building ===
After the Third Partition of Poland in the end of the 18th century (1795), Russian and Austrian empires started to share a common border. In order to secure the western frontiers of the newly annexed lands, the government under the rule of Alexander II decided to build a fortress next to a railroad going from Kyiv to Lviv, not far from the town of Dubno. The construction, however, was postponed for about 50 years due to the French invasion of Russia and Crimean War.

The building of hillforts and provisional earthworks of the fortress commenced in the 1860s under supervision of Crimean War (1853) veteran Eduard Totleben. In 1873, about 66 million rubles were levied by the government for the project. In the 1870s through 1880s, the fortress was actively built. Besides stone works and bricks used for primary material of the building, concrete, previously unknown in the Russian Empire as building material, was also used. Materials were delivered by railroad, and almost all works were done by subcontractors. By the 1890s, the fortress was finished and Emperor Alexander II with family have visited it to make a final assessment.

On February 2, 1905, troops that were stationed in the fortress rebelled due to officers abusing soldiers and poor food supply conditions. The rebellion was suppressed, the units dissolved, and the troops were sentenced to hard labor. The fortress was turned into a military prison, with disciplinary battalion of Selenginsky 41 infantry brigade (Russia) deployed there instead.

=== World War I ===
In 1912, Dmitry Karbyshev, a military engineer, visited the fortress as part of an official commission to inspect it.

In the beginning of 1915, during the World War I, the fortress was used by the Southwestern Front troops of the Russian Empire as a defensive fortification until Great Retreat in 1915. It was won back shortly after the Brusilov offensive in the summer of 1916, when the 4th Austria-Hungary army was pushed out of the fortress. Allegedly, 200 soldiers of the Austrian army are buried in the vicinity of the fortress as a result of the battle.

=== Interwar period ===
In 1920, the fortress was occupied by Poles and the Red Army's 1st Cavalry Army led by Semyon Budyonny attempted an attack on it, but ultimately failed. The Poles managed to flee to the local Gorbachin island as the Russians advanced and left it behind. Over 1000 Bolsheviks fell dead allegedly and some Poles were captured.

=== World War II ===
No battle for the fortress took place during World War II. However, it was refurbished in 1933-1935 by Poles who had deployed a garrison there, but in June 1939, they lost it to advancing German troops.

=== Postwar ===
In 1965, Ministry of trade of Ukrainian Soviet Socialist Republic made several attempts to convert the fortress into a canned food warehouse but failed due to very high humidity and evaporation levels. Carpathian Military District also made a few futile attempts to utilize the space, but also failed.

== Status ==
As of the beginning of the 21st century, the fortress remains in a dire state, mostly due to neglect and highly wet environment of the surrounding areas. In 2017, it was reported to be closed to public visits because of poor condition, but the ban is not enforced.

== Characteristics ==
It resembles a rhombus, with each side 240 meters (790 ft) long and up to 6 meters (20 ft). It has seven underground levels with a series of tunnels, kitchen accommodation, laundry, church, morgue, phone lines, 3 water wells, and sewage. It also had small warehouses for gunpowder and medical rooms. There are also a range of military accommodations and fortifications, both for troops and artillery. The rear side has a deep ditch, which could have been crossed by a retracting bridge built in 1893 in an emergency event. The fortress could accommodate up to 800 people. The entrance was located on the east and south sides.

The walls of the fortress bear many century old hand-made inscriptions.

== Gallery ==
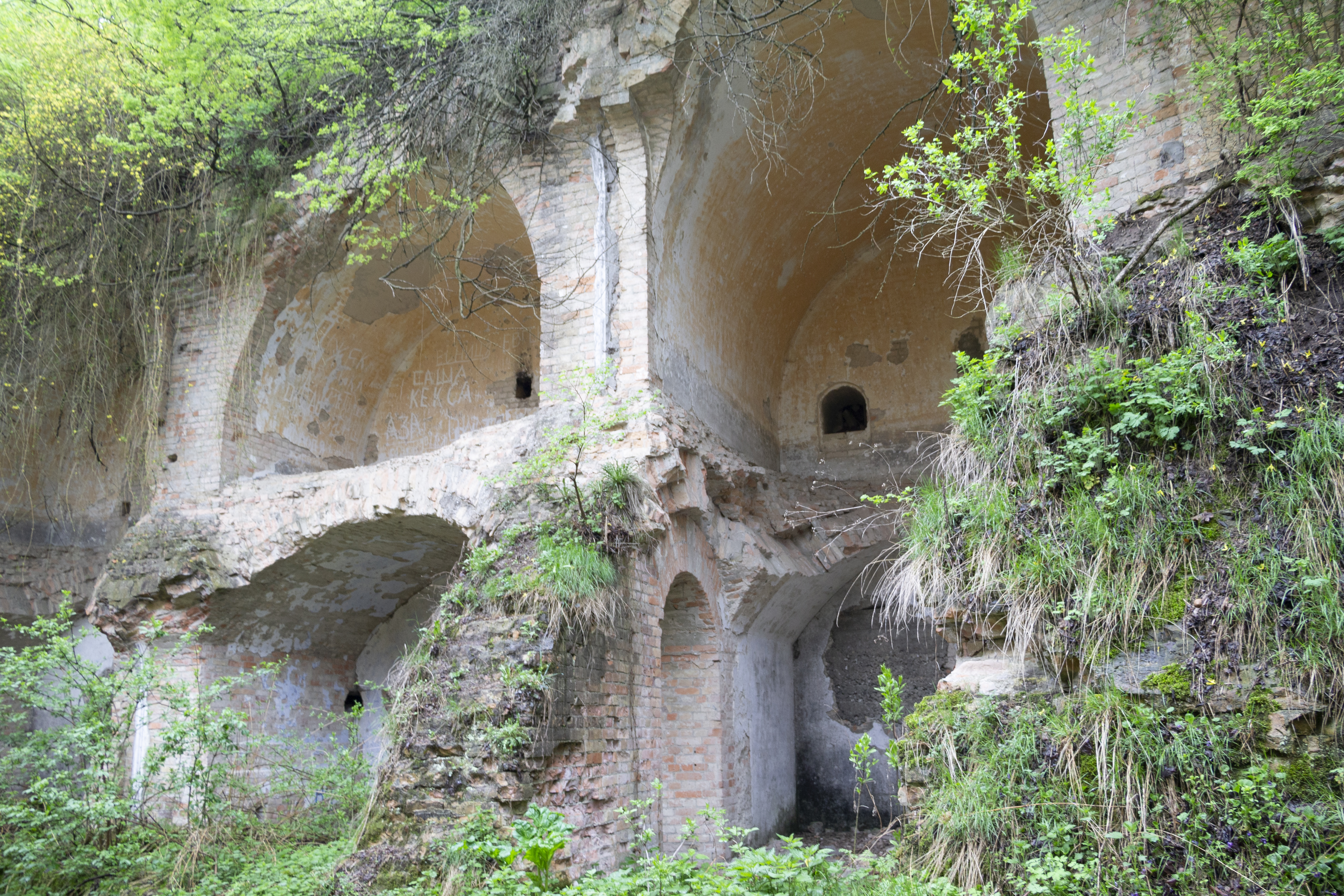

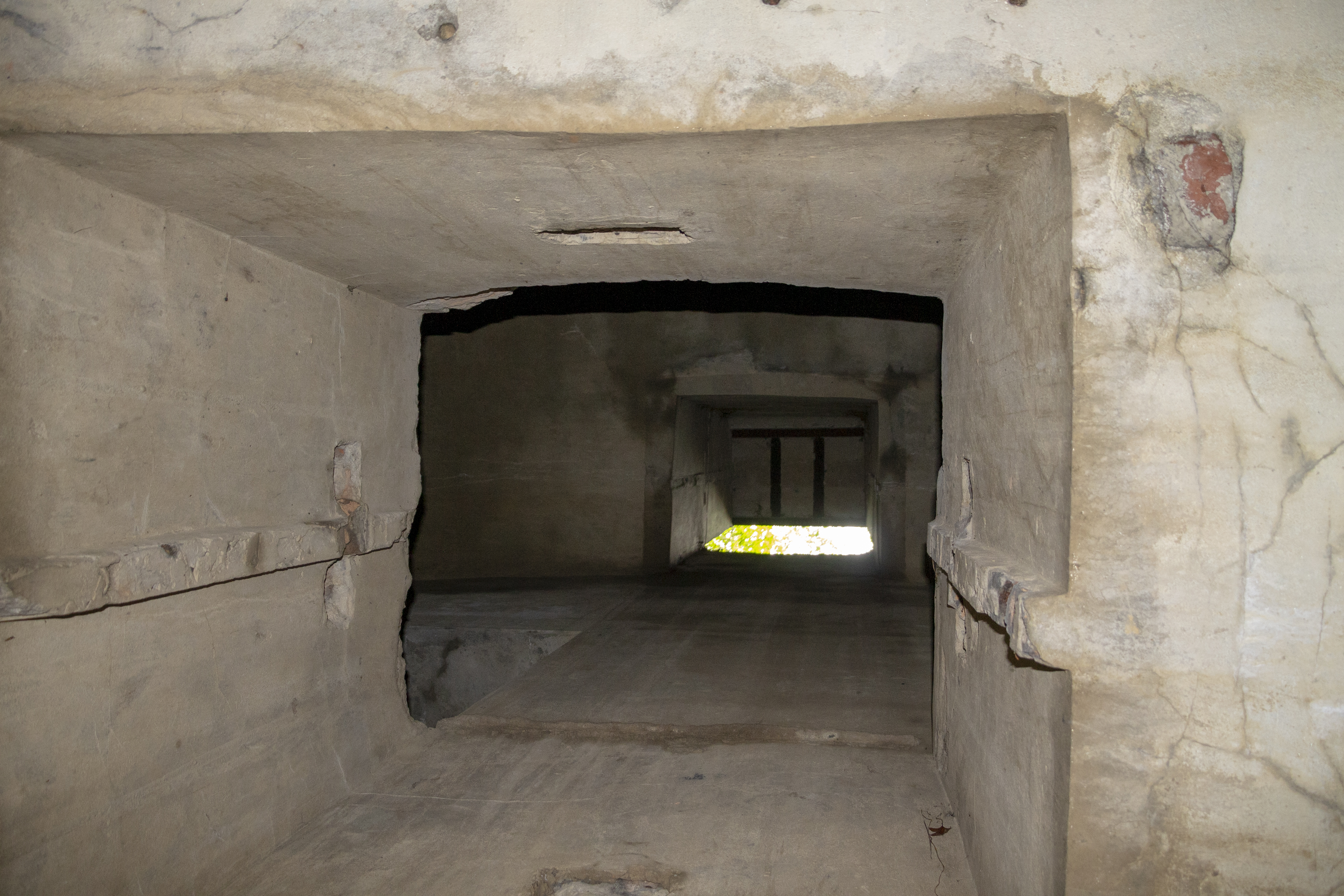

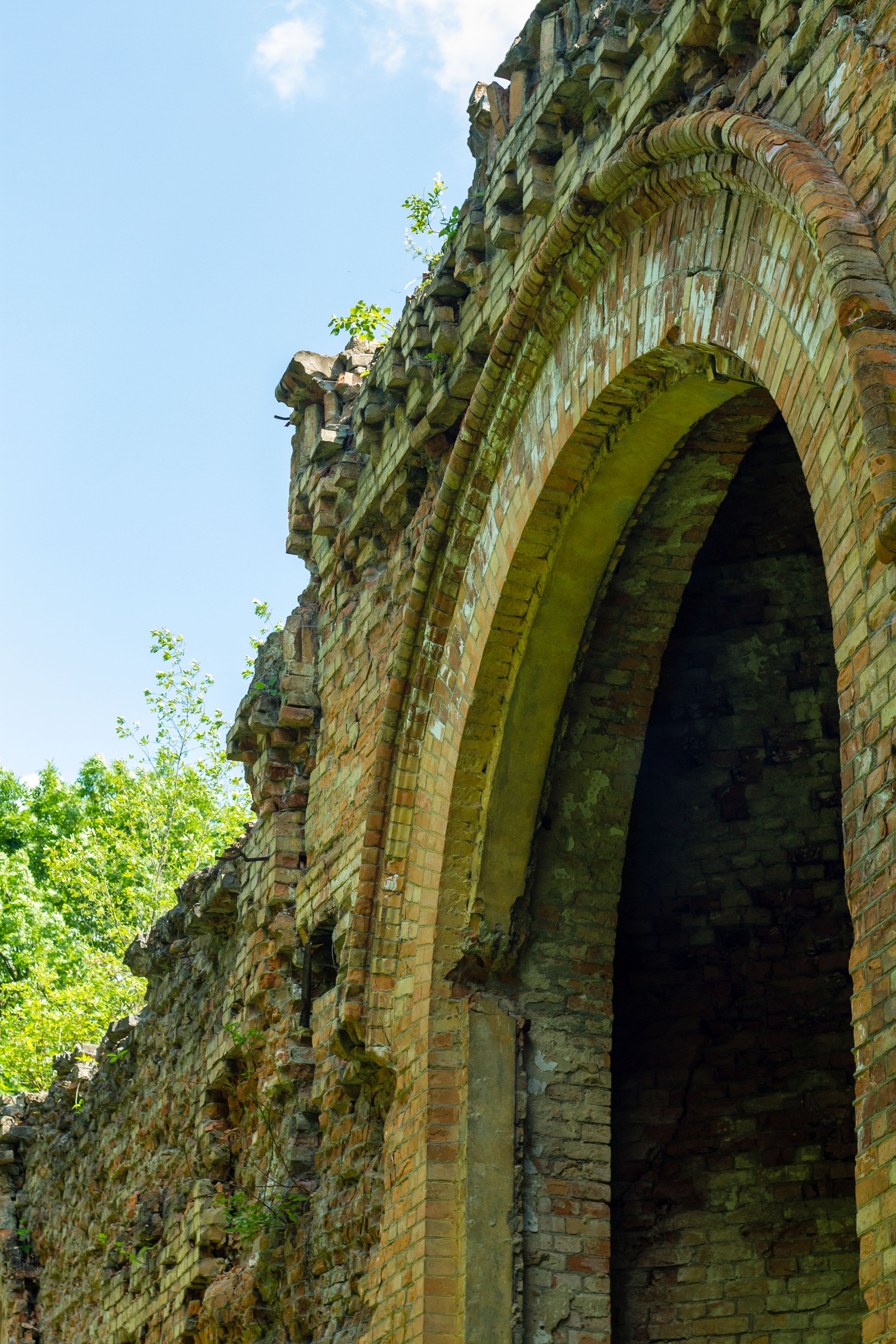

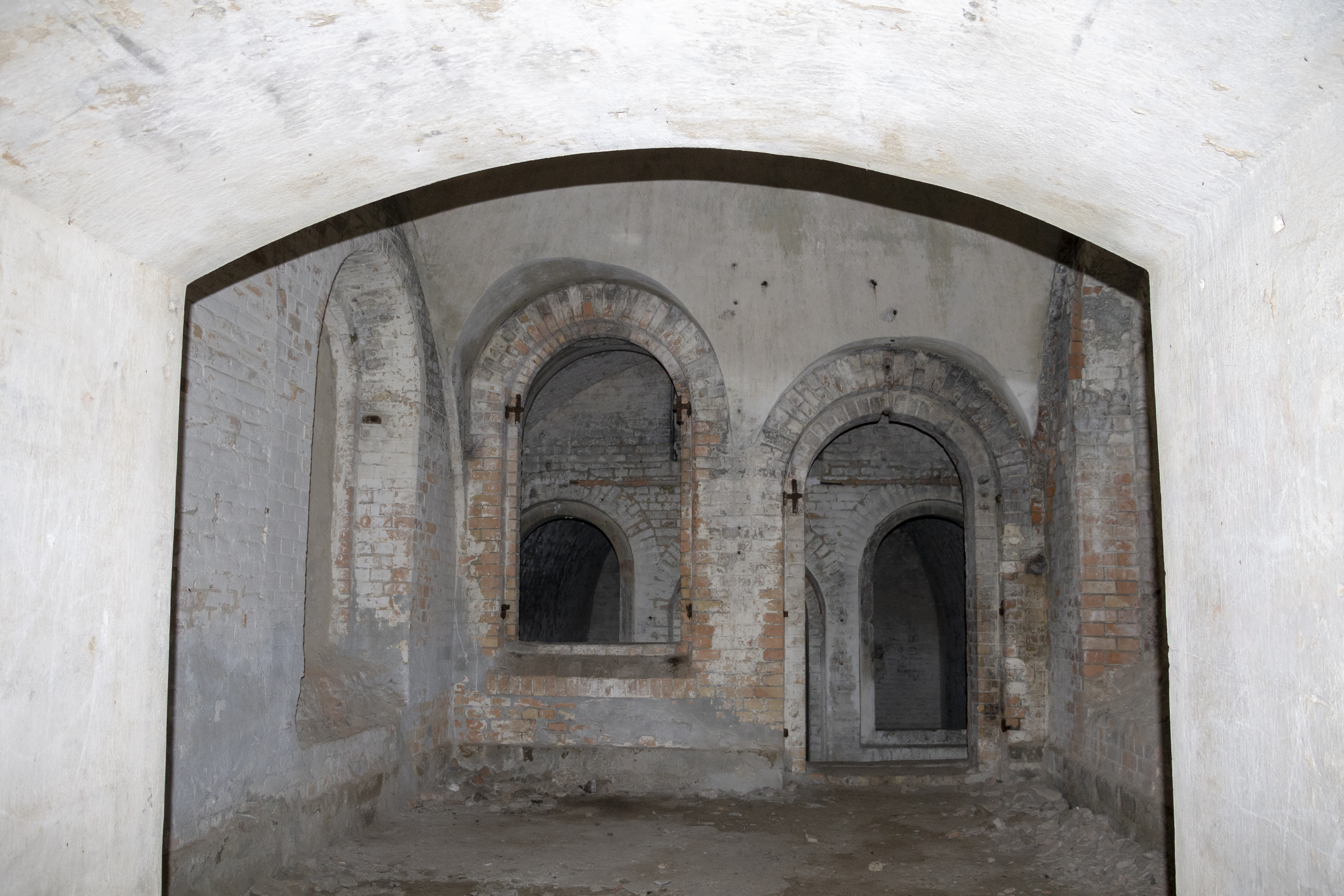

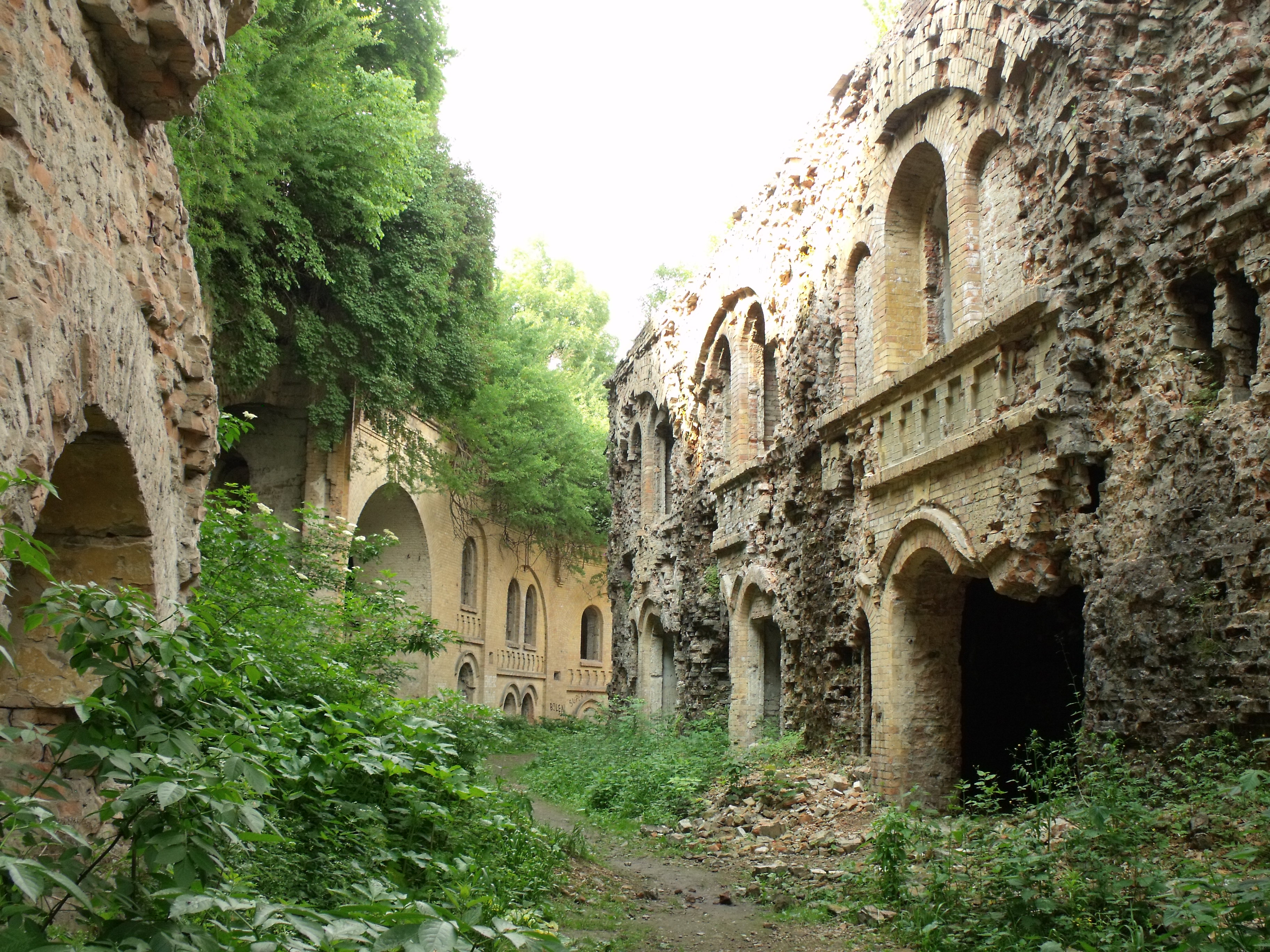

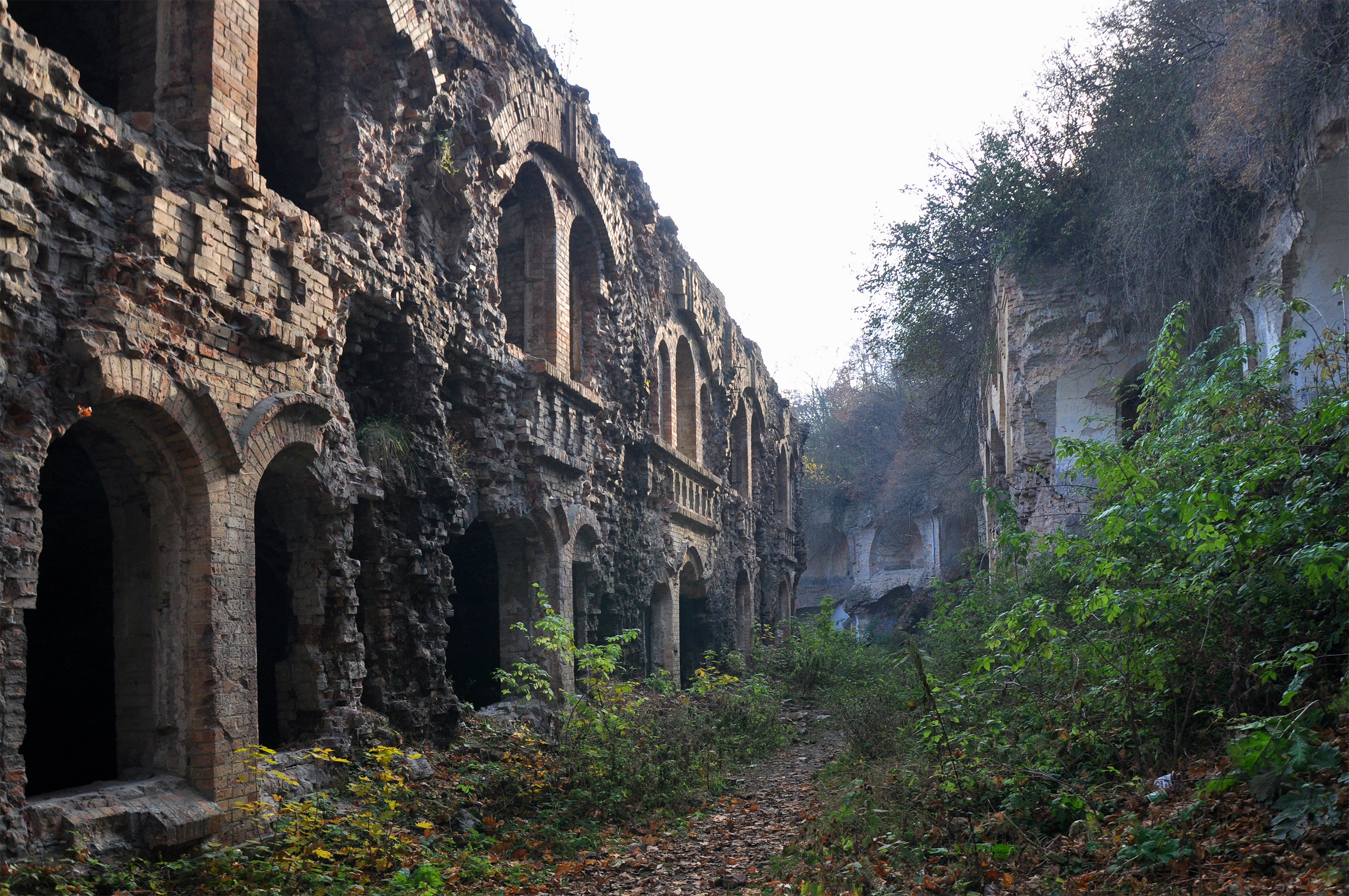

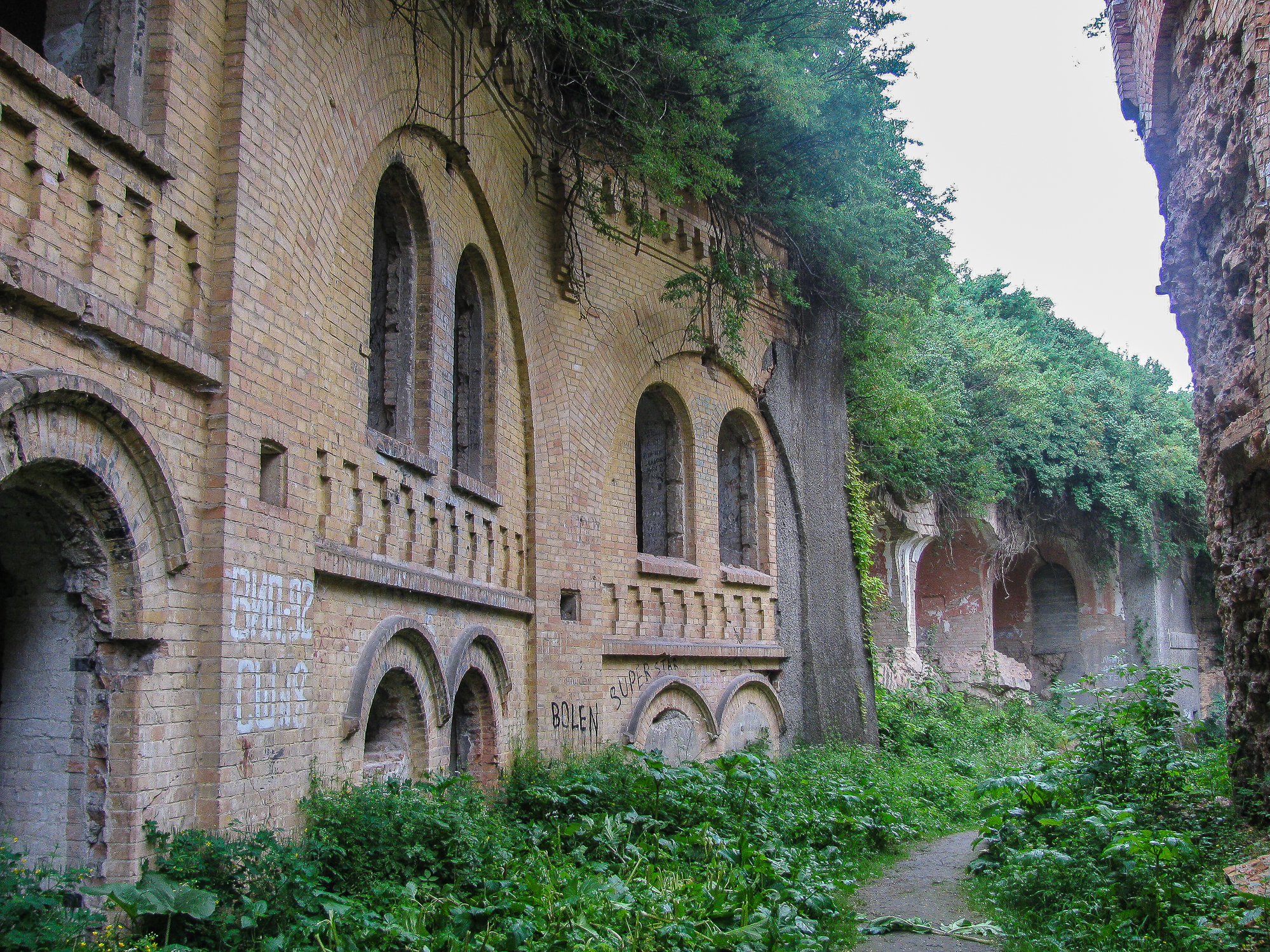

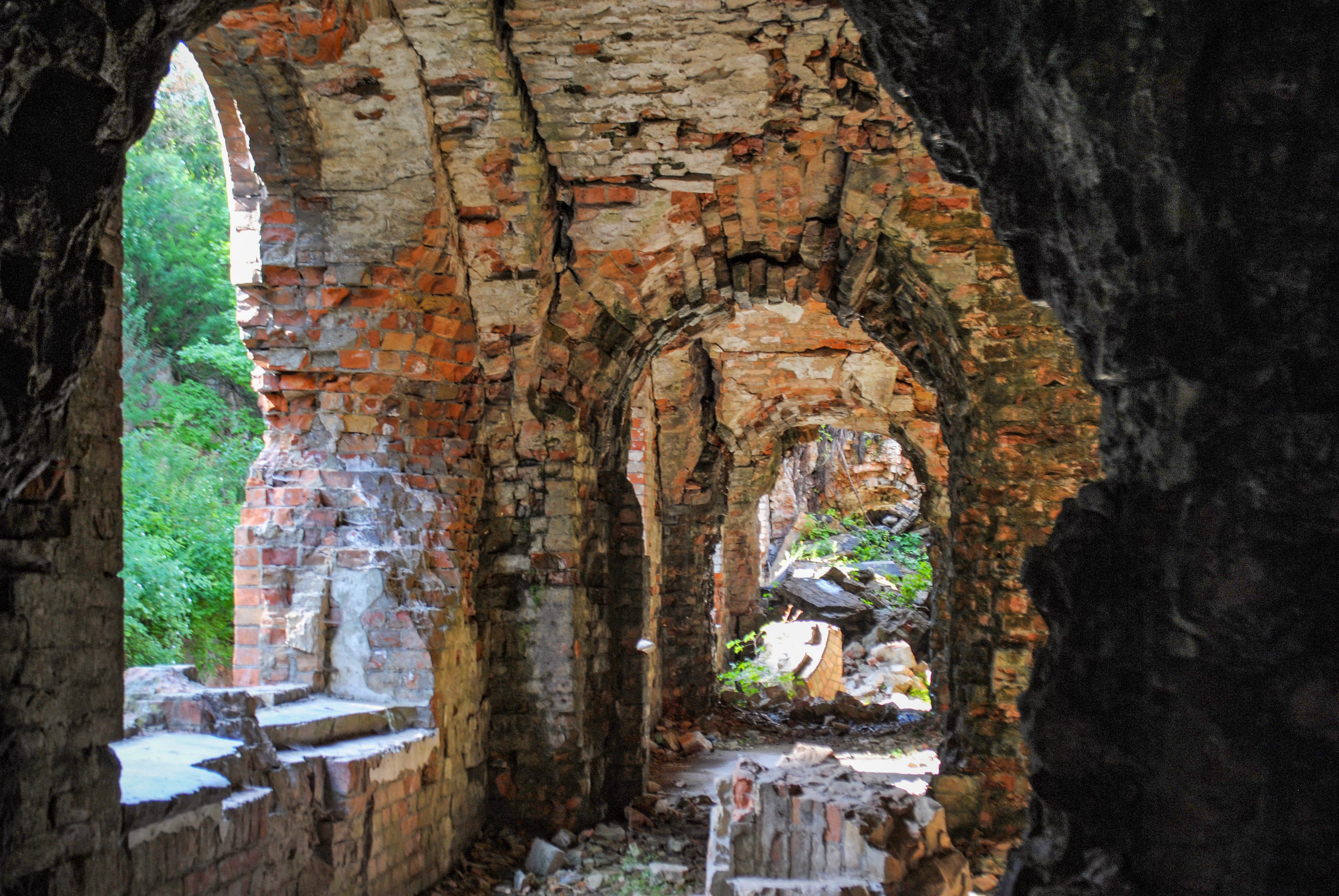

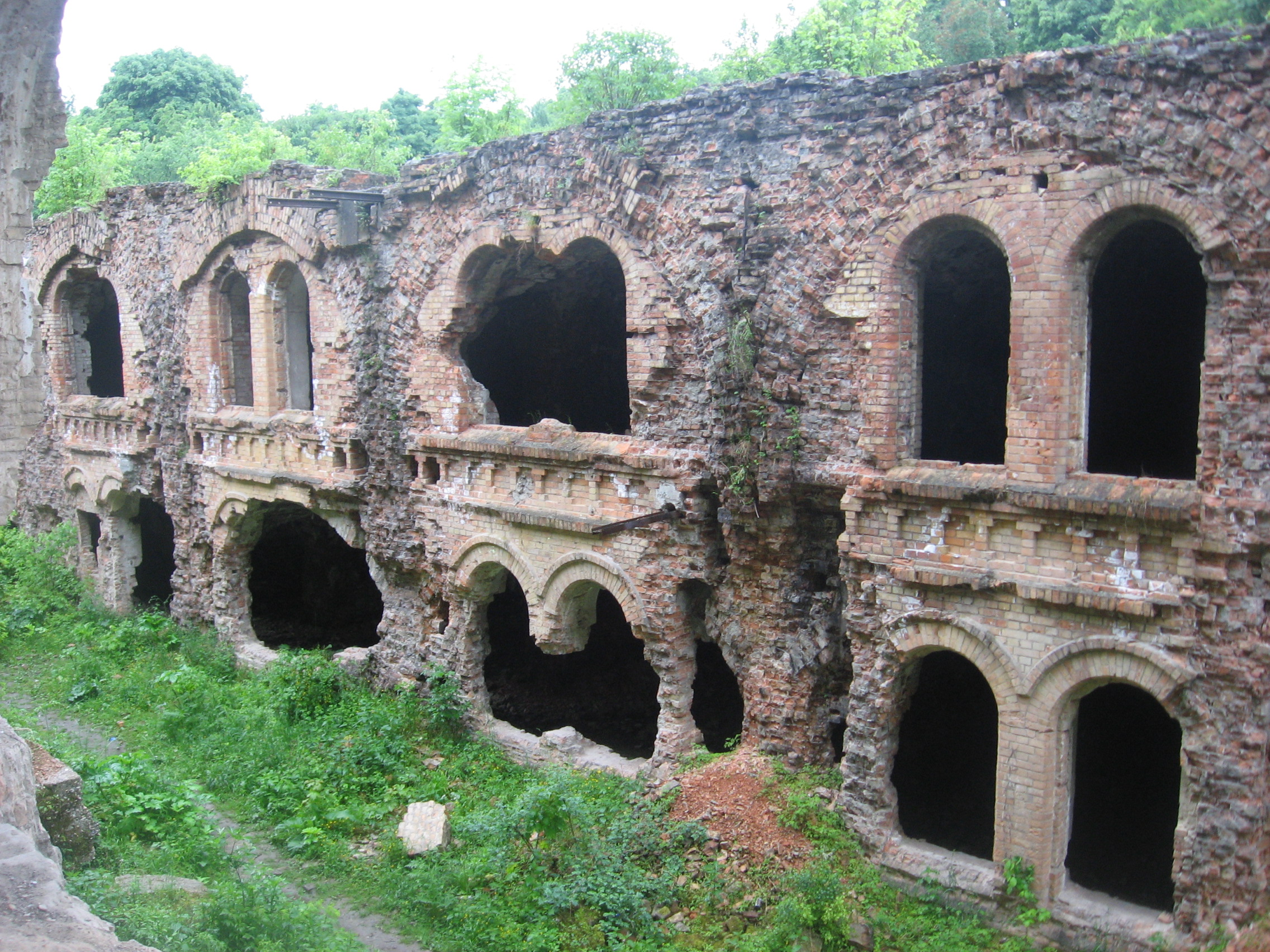

== See also ==
- List of castles in Ukraine
