= Deventsi gas field =

Natural gas field in Bulgaria

Deventsi
- Location within Bulgaria
- Country: Bulgaria
- Region: Pleven Province
- Offshore/onshore: Onshore
- Coordinates: 43°19′16″N 24°9′46″E
- Operator: Direct Petroleum

Field history
- Discovery: 2009
- Start of production: 2009

Production
- Estimated gas in place: 235×10^{9} cu ft (6.7×10^{9} m^{3})

The Deventsi gas field is a natural gas field in Deventsi, Pleven Province, Bulgaria. It was discovered in 2009 and developed by Direct Petroleum. The total proven reserves of the Deventsi gas field are around 235 billion cubic feet (6.6 billion m^{3}), and production is slated to begin at 15 million cubic feet/day (420,000 m^{3}/day) in 2009 to 30 million cubic feet/day (850,000 m^{3}/day) in 2010. The gas field can provide half of the Bulgarian market consumption for around 2 – 3 years.
