= Iskar (town) =

Iskar Искър
- Location of Iskar
- Coordinates: 43°27′N 24°16′E
- Country: Bulgaria
- Provinces (Oblast): Pleven

Government
  - Mayor: Ivan Yolov
- Elevation: 250 m (820 ft)

Population (December 2009)
  - Total: 3,622
- Time zone: UTC+2 (EET)
  - Summer (DST): UTC+3 (EEST)
- Postal Code: 5868
- Area code: 06516

Iskar (Bulgarian: Искър, [ˈiskɐr]; also transliterated as Iskur or Iskǎr; former name Pelovo) is a town in central northern Bulgaria, part of Pleven Province. It is the administrative centre of Iskar Municipality, which lies in the western part of the Province. The town of Iskar is located in the central Danubian Plain, near the Iskar River, 18 kilometres from Knezha and 32 kilometres from the provincial capital of Pleven. As of December 2009, the town had a population of 3,622 inhabitants.

According to the tradition, Iskar was founded in the early 17th century as a hamlet of around 20 houses near the river. It was known as Mahalata, Gorum Mahala and Pisarevska Mahala. A private school was opened in 1829 and the church of Saint Demetrius with a religious school was built in 1837. Vasil Levski founded a secret revolutionary committee in the village in 1872. Following the Liberation of Bulgaria, a new school was built in 1897, with an additional storey added in 1924; the modern school building was inaugurated in 1999.
