= Tottleben (disambiguation) =

Tottleben is a municipality in Germany. Tottleben may also refer to:

== People ==
- Gottlob Heinrich Curt von Tottleben, a Baltic German military engineer and Imperial Russian Army general
- Eduard Totleben, also known as Franz Eduard Graf von Tottleben, a Baltic German military engineer and Imperial Russian Army general

== See also ==
- Totleben (disambiguation)
