= Ferdinand Kozovski =

Bulgarian communist politician and Lieutenant General

- Фердинанд Козовски
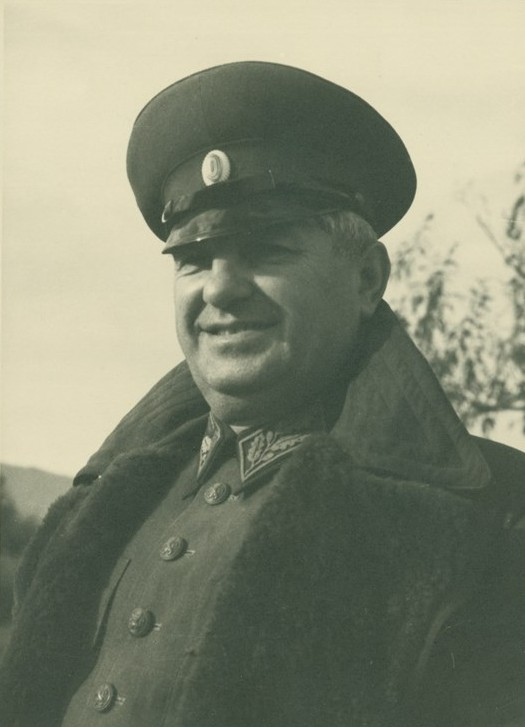
- Kozovski in 1944–1945

Chairman of the Presidium of the National Assembly
- In office 1950–1965
- Preceded by: Rayko Damyanov
- Succeeded by: Sava Ganovski

Personal details
- Born: 27 January 1892 Knezha, Kingdom of Bulgaria
- Died: 12 September 1965 (aged 73) Sofia, Bulgarian People's Republic
- Party: Bulgarian Communist Party
- Education: Sofia University; Frunze Military Academy
- Profession: Politician
- Awards: Order of Bravery

Ferdinand Todorov Kozovski (Bulgarian: Фердинанд Тодоров Козовски; 27 January 1892 – 12 September 1965) was a Bulgarian communist politician and Lieutenant General in the Bulgarian Army who served as Chairman of the National Assembly of Bulgaria from 1950 to 1965.

Born in Knezha in the Principality of Bulgaria's northwest, Ferdinand Kozovski graduated from the Reserve Officers Academy. He became a member of the Bulgarian Workers' Social Democratic Party (Narrow Socialists), the precursor to the Bulgarian Communist Party, in 1911. Kozovski took part in the Balkan Wars and World War I as a serviceman in the Bulgarian Army; after the wars, he graduated in law from Sofia University.

In 1923, Kozovski was among the leaders of the quickly-crushed June Uprising, a chaotic agrarian uprising against the right-wing 9 June coup d'état; he also participated in the better-organized communist September Uprising of the same year. After that uprising's suppression, Kozovski was forced to emigrate to the Soviet Union, where he graduated from the M. V. Frunze Military Academy and became a reader of military science at the Communist University of the National Minorities of the West.

Ferdinand Kozovski took part in the International Brigades of the Spanish Civil War (1936–1939). Under the name "Colonel Petrov", he commanded the "Dombrovsky" battalion of the 11th International Brigade in the early stages of the Battle of Madrid. He later became deputy commander of the 12th International Brigade, a position he held until his recall from Moscow. During World War II, he headed the Bulgarian edition of Radio Moscow and edited several illegal publications. He returned to Bulgaria after the Soviet invasion in 1944 and the 9 September coup d'état. As Bulgaria switched allegiance to the Allies and took part in the ultimate defeat of Nazi Germany, Kozovski was assistant chief of staff of the Bulgarian forces which drew the Nazis out of much of Yugoslavia and Hungary.

After the war, Ferdinand Kozovski was made Assistant Minister of Popular Defence. In 1948–1949, he was Bulgarian minister plenipotentiary in the People's Republic of Hungary. From 1949 to 1950 he held the same position as a Bulgarian diplomat in the People's Republic of China. In 1950, he became Chairman of the National Assembly of Bulgaria and served as such during four national assembly terms until 1965, when he died.
