= Odarne =

Odarne Одърне
- Village
- Location within Bulgaria
- Coordinates: 43.3403°N 24.9348°E
- Country: Bulgaria
- Province: Pleven Province
- Municipality: Pordim
- Elevation: 117 m (384 ft)
- Time zone: UTC+2 (EET)
  - Summer (DST): UTC+3 (EEST)

Odarne (Bulgarian: Одърне) is a village in Pleven Province of Northern Bulgaria. As of 2021, the population stood at 628 residents, with 304 males, and 324 females.

The village is linked to surrounding areas via bus and railway services. Its infrastructure includes asphalted main streets with lighting and established water and electricity systems. Mobile coverage is available from all major operators. The village also features a stadium and a local football club.

The village is equipped with a town hall, kindergarten, primary school, community center, stores, and restaurants. The village also home to local health care professionals, including a local general practitioner, a pediatrician, and a dentist.

== Landmarks ==
In the neighboring city of Pleven, located about 30 km (18.6 miles) from the village, several tourist sites can be located, including: the Pleven Panorama, the Regional History Museum, and the Mausoleum-Chapel of St. George Pobedonosets.
