= Pordim =

Pordim Пордим
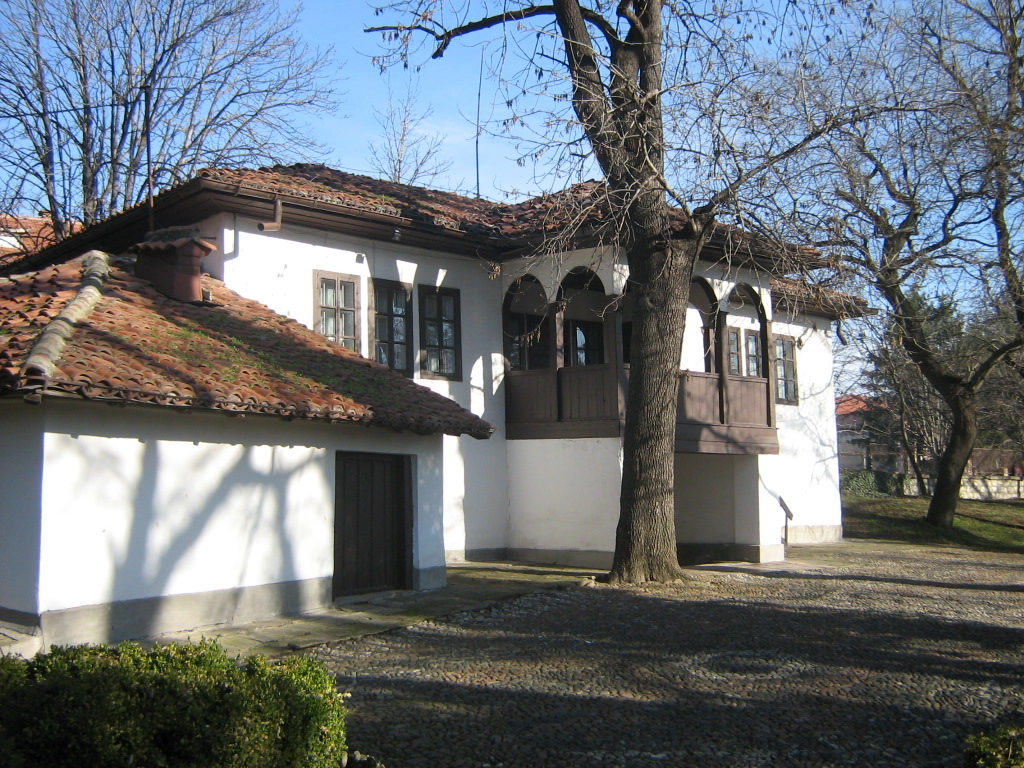
- Pordim Museum house “His Royal Majesty Carol I”

- Location of Pordim
- Coordinates: 43°23′N 24°51′E
- Country: Bulgaria
- Provinces (Oblast): Pleven

Government
  - Mayor: Detelin Vasilev
- Elevation: 155 m (509 ft)

Population (December 2009)
  - Total: 2,117
- Time zone: UTC+2 (EET)
  - Summer (DST): UTC+3 (EEST)
- Postal Code: 5898
- Area code: 06513

Pordim (Bulgarian: Пордим [ˈpɔrdim]) is a town in Pleven Province in central northern Bulgaria and the administrative centre of Pordim Municipality. The town is 155 metres above sea level in the Danubian Plain. In December 2009 the population was 2,117.

Pordim is thought to be the site of the first ever telephone connection in Bulgaria, during the siege of Plevna of the Russo-Turkish War of 1877–78. It linked Grand Duke Nicholas Nikolaevich of Russia with Prince Carol I of Romania.

The town played an active part in the war of 1877–78. It has two museums, the Alexander II Russian Museum and the Carol I Romanian Museum, both housed in the buildings where the two heads of state stayed during the battle for Pleven, commanding their respective forces.

== Honour ==
Pordim Islands off Robert Island, South Shetland Islands are named after Pordim.
