= Pordim Islands =

Antarctic islands

- Location of Robert Island in the South Shetland Islands

- Location within Antarctica Location within Antarctic Peninsula

Geography
- Location: Antarctica
- Coordinates: 62°18′41″S 59°39′33″W
- Archipelago: South Shetland Islands
- Area: 10 ha (25 acres)

Administration
- Antarctica
- Administered under the Antarctic Treaty System

Demographics
- Population: uninhabited

Pordim Islands (Bulgarian: острови Пордим, ‘Ostrovi Pordim’ 'os-tro-vi 'por-dim) are two adjacent islands situated 870 m (950 yd) east-northeast of Heywood Island and 2.1 km (1.3 mi) northwest of Catharina Point on Robert Island, South Shetland Islands. Extending 960 m (1,050 yd) in east-southeast to west-northwest direction. The larger islet has a surface area of 10 hectares (25 acres). Bulgarian early mapping in 2009. Named after the town of Pordim in northern Bulgaria.

== See also ==
- Composite Antarctic Gazetteer
- List of Antarctic islands south of 60° S
- SCAR
- Territorial claims in Antarctica
