= Iskar Municipality =

Iskar Municipality Община Искър
- Municipality
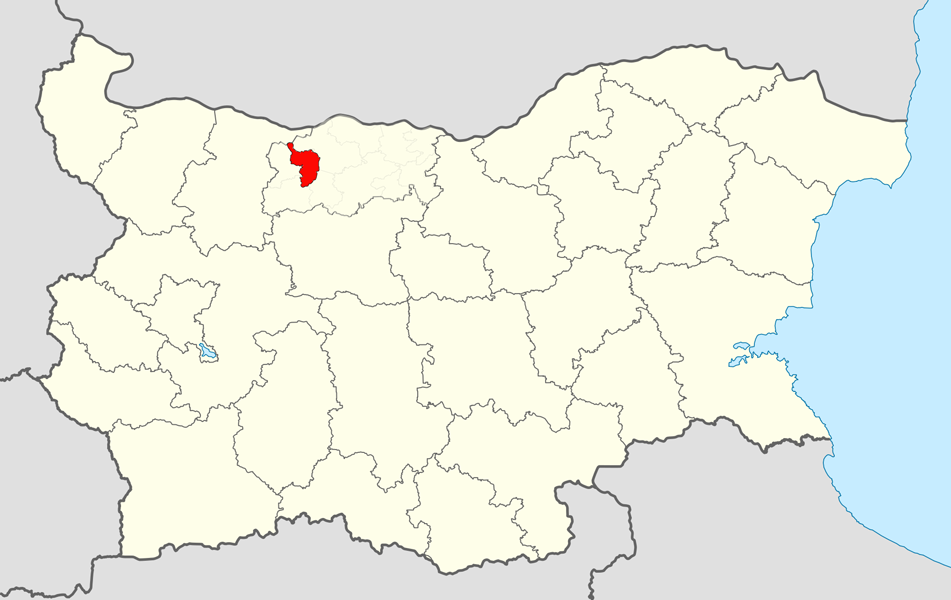
- Iskar Municipality within Bulgaria and Pleven Province.
- Coordinates: 43°29′N 24°18′E
- Country: Bulgaria
- Province (Oblast): Pleven
- Admin. centre (Obshtinski tsentar): Iskar

Area
  - Total: 239 km^{2} (92 sq mi)

Population (December 2009)
  - Total: 7,717
  - Density: 32.3/km^{2} (83.6/sq mi)
- Time zone: UTC+2 (EET)
  - Summer (DST): UTC+3 (EEST)

Iskar Municipality (Bulgarian: Община Искър) is a municipality (obshtina) in Pleven Province, Northern Bulgaria. It is named after its administrative centre - the town of Iskar.

The municipality embraces a territory of 239 km^{2} (92 sq mi) with a population, as of December 2009, of 7,717 inhabitants.

== Settlements ==
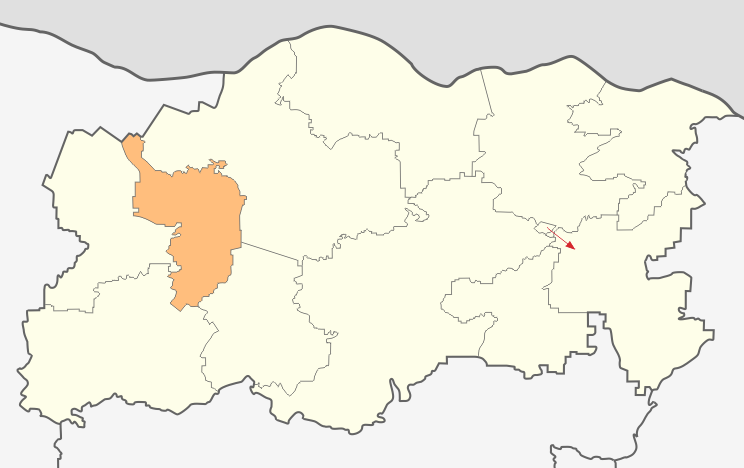
Iskar Municipality within Pleven Province

(towns are shown in bold):

Town/Village	Cyrillic	Population (December 2009)
**Iskar**	**Искър**	3,622
Dolni Lukovit	Долни Луковит	2,042
Pisarovo	Писарово	879
Staroseltsi	Староселци	1,174
Total		7,717

== Demography ==
The following table shows the change of the population during the last four decades.

Iskar Municipality
**Year**	1975	1985	1992	**2001**	2005	2007	2009	**2011**
**Population**	13,683	11,503	10,228	9,107	8,357	8,052	7,717	...
Sources: Census 2001, Census 2011, „pop-stat.mashke.org“,

=== Religion ===
According to the latest Bulgarian census of 2011, the religious composition, among those who answered the optional question on religious identification, was the following:

Religious composition of Iskar Municipality
Orthodox Christianity	71.2%
Catholicism	0.8%
Protestantism	0.0%
Islam	0.4%
No religion	19.5%
Prefer not to answer, others and indefinable	8.1%

== See also ==
- Provinces of Bulgaria
- Municipalities of Bulgaria
- List of cities and towns in Bulgaria
