= Knezha Municipality =

Knezha Municipality Община Кнежа
- Municipality
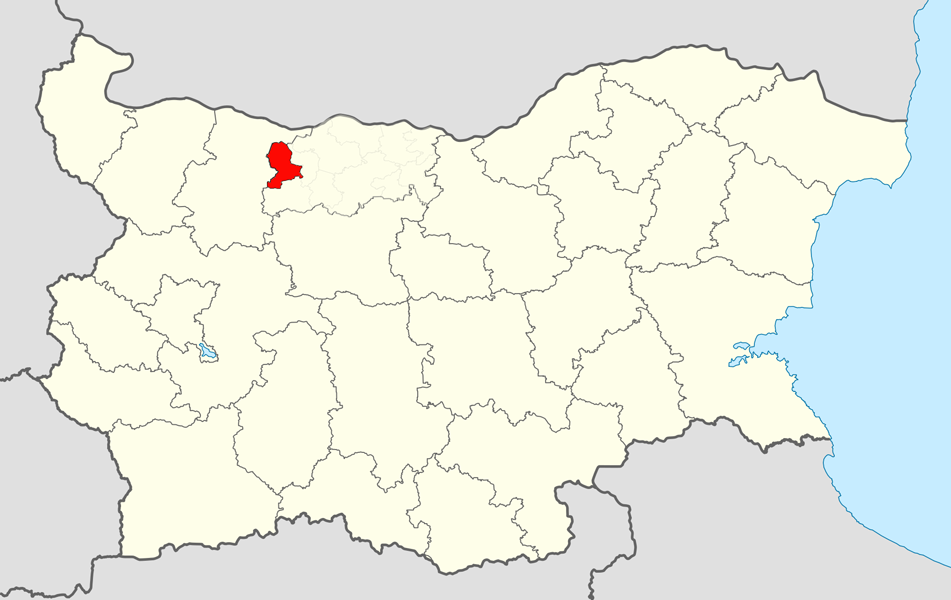
- Knezha Municipality within Bulgaria and Pleven Province.
- Coordinates: 43°28′N 24°8′E
- Country: Bulgaria
- Province (Oblast): Pleven
- Admin. centre (Obshtinski tsentar): Knezha

Area
  - Total: 317.83 km^{2} (122.71 sq mi)

Population (December 2009)
  - Total: 14,839
  - Density: 46.688/km^{2} (120.92/sq mi)
- Time zone: UTC+2 (EET)
  - Summer (DST): UTC+3 (EEST)

Knezha Municipality (Bulgarian: Община Кнежа) is a municipality (obshtina) in Pleven Province, Northern Bulgaria. It is named after its administrative centre - the town of Knezha.

The municipality embraces a territory of 317.83 km^{2} with a population, as of December 2009, of 14,839 inhabitants.

== Settlements ==
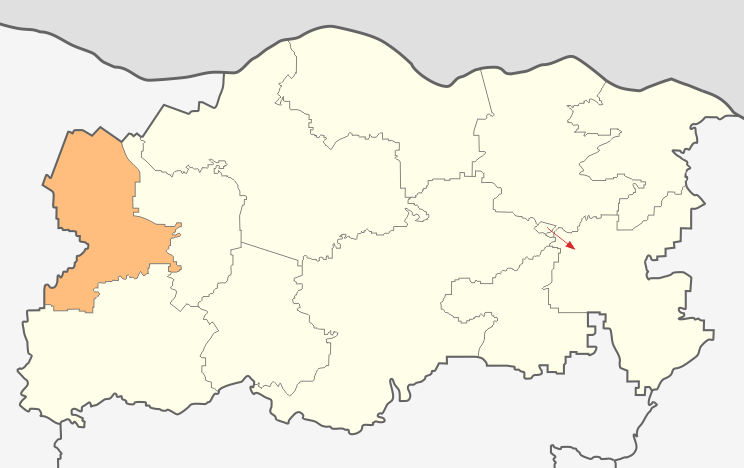
Knezha Municipality within Pleven Province

(towns are shown in bold):

Town/Village	Cyrillic	Population (December 2009)
**Knezha**	**Кнежа**	11,191
Brenitsa	Бреница	2,039
Enitsa	Еница	1,098
Lazarovo	Лазарово	511
Total		14,839

== Demography ==
The following table shows the change of the population during the last four decades.

Knezha Municipality
**Year**	1975	1985	1992	**2001**	2005	2007	2009	**2011**
**Population**	22,031	20,329	18,640	17,079	15,932	15,372	14,839	...
Sources: Census 2001, Census 2011, „pop-stat.mashke.org“,

=== Religion ===
According to the latest Bulgarian census of 2011, the religious composition, among those who answered the optional question on religious identification, was the following:

Religious composition of Knezha Municipality
Orthodox Christianity	79.8%
Catholicism	0.9%
Protestantism	0.6%
Islam	0.5%
No religion	9.9%
Prefer not to answer, others and indefinable	8.4%

== See also ==
- Provinces of Bulgaria
- Municipalities of Bulgaria
- List of cities and towns in Bulgaria
