= Levski Municipality =

Levski Municipality Община Левски
- Municipality
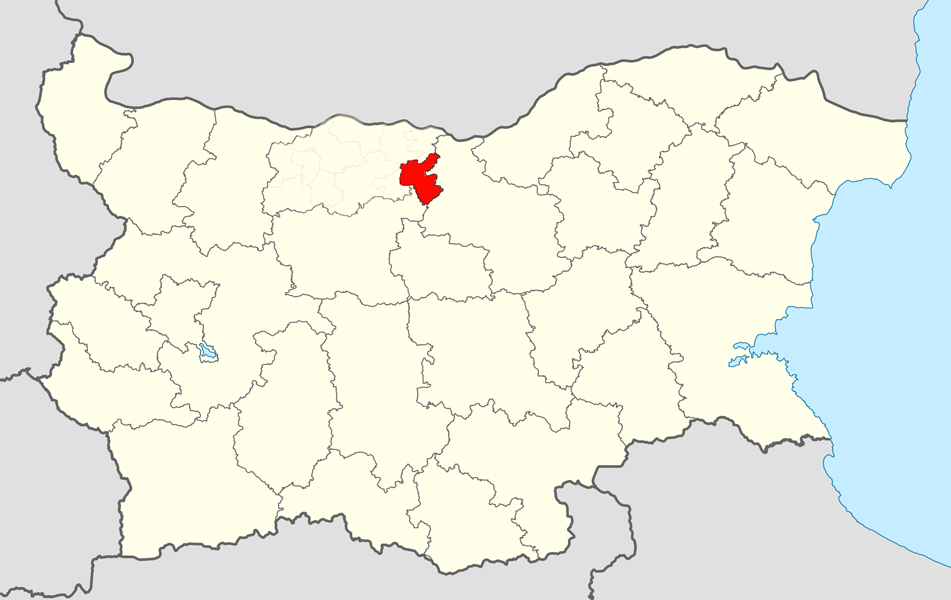
- Levski Municipality within Bulgaria and Pleven Province.
- Coordinates: 43°23′N 25°9′E
- Country: Bulgaria
- Province (Oblast): Pleven
- Admin. centre (Obshtinski tsentar): Levski

Area
  - Total: 414 km^{2} (160 sq mi)

Population (February 2011)
  - Total: 19,938
  - Density: 48.2/km^{2} (125/sq mi)
- Time zone: UTC+2 (EET)
  - Summer (DST): UTC+3 (EEST)

Levski municipality (Bulgarian: Община Левски) is a municipality (obshtina) in Pleven Province, Northern Bulgaria. It is named after its administrative centre - the town of Levski.

The municipality embraces a territory of 414 km^{2} (160 sq mi) with a population, as of February 2011, of 19,938 inhabitants.

== Settlements ==
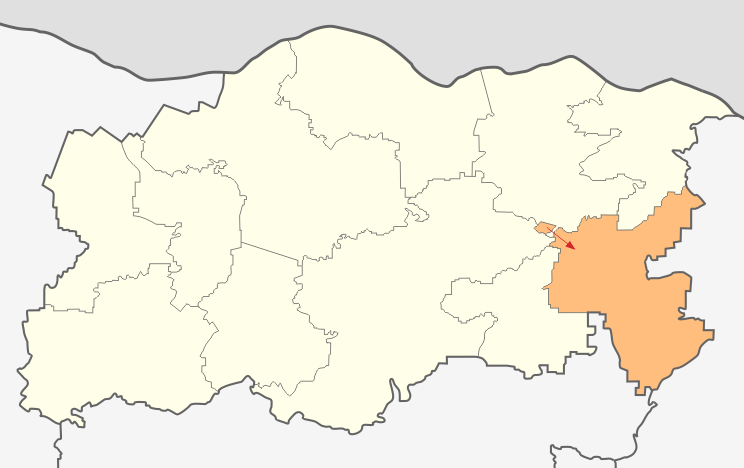
Levski Municipality within Pleven Province

(towns are shown in bold):

Town/Village	Cyrillic	Population (December 2009)
**Levski**	**Левски**	10,571
Asenovtsi	Асеновци	1,606
Asparuhovo	Аспарухово	602
Bozhurluk	Божурлук	144
Balgarene	Българене	897
Varana	Варана	98
Gradishte	Градище	1,234
Izgrev	Изгрев	499
Kozar Belene	Козар Белене	843
Malchika	Малчика	1,438
Obnova	Обнова	2,242
Stezherovo	Стежерово	597
Tranchovitsa	Трънчовица	716
Total		21,487

== Demography ==
The following table shows the change of the population during the last four decades.

Levski Municipality
**Year**	1975	1985	1992	**2001**	2005	2007	2009	**2011**
**Population**	34,410	31,087	29,127	25,995	23,172	22,304	21,487	...
Sources: Census 2001, Census 2011, „pop-stat.mashke.org“,

=== Religion ===
According to the latest Bulgarian census of 2011, the religious composition, among those who answered the optional question on religious identification, was the following:

Religious composition of Levski Municipality
Orthodox Christianity	69.1%
Catholicism	11.0%
Protestantism	0.7%
Islam	5.6%
No religion	6.4%
Prefer not to answer, others and indefinable	6.2%

== See also ==
- Provinces of Bulgaria
- Municipalities of Bulgaria
- List of cities and towns in Bulgaria
