= Eduard Totleben =

Russian military engineer and general (1818–1884)

Graf Franz Eduard von Tottleben
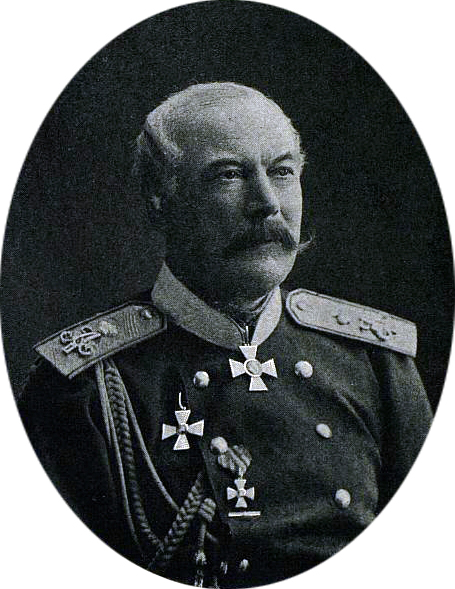
- Totleben in 1877–1884
- Born: 20 May 1818; Mitau, Courland Governorate, Russian Empire
- Died: 1 July 1884 (aged 66); Bad Soden, Grand Duchy of Hesse, German Empire
- Other name: Eduard Ivanovich Totleben
- Military career
- Allegiance: Russia
- Branch: Imperial Russian Army
- Service years: 1836–1884
- Rank: Engineer-general
- Conflicts: Caucasian War; Crimean War; Russo-Turkish War
- Awards: Order of St. Andrew; Order of St. George (2nd class); Order of St. Vladimir; Order of the Cross of Takovo; Order of Prince Danilo I

Coat of arms of the Tottleben (Totleben) family of 1872, in the Baltic Coat of arms book by Carl Arvid von Klingspor in 1882.

Franz Eduard Graf von Tottleben (Note: also spelled Todleben, Totleben or Todtleben) (Russian: Эдуа́рд Ива́нович Тотле́бен, romanized: Eduárd Ivánovich Totlében; 20 May [O.S. 8 May] 1818 – 1 July [O.S. 19 June] 1884), was a Russian military engineer and general of Baltic German descent. He was in charge of fortification and sapping work during a number of important Russian military campaigns.

== Early life ==
Totleben was born at Mitau in Courland (now Jelgava, Latvia). His parents were of Thuringian descent and originated in Tottleben, belonging to the Baltic German noble Tottleben family (also spelled Totleben or Todleben), but had since become merchants. Eduard himself was intended for commerce, but instead sought a career as a military engineer. He entered the school of engineers at Saint Petersburg (now the Military Engineering-Technical University).

== Military career ==
=== Early military career ===
Totleben joined the Imperial Russian Army in 1836. He saw active service as captain of engineers in the campaigns against Imam Shamil in the Caucasus, beginning in 1848 for two years.

=== Crimean War ===
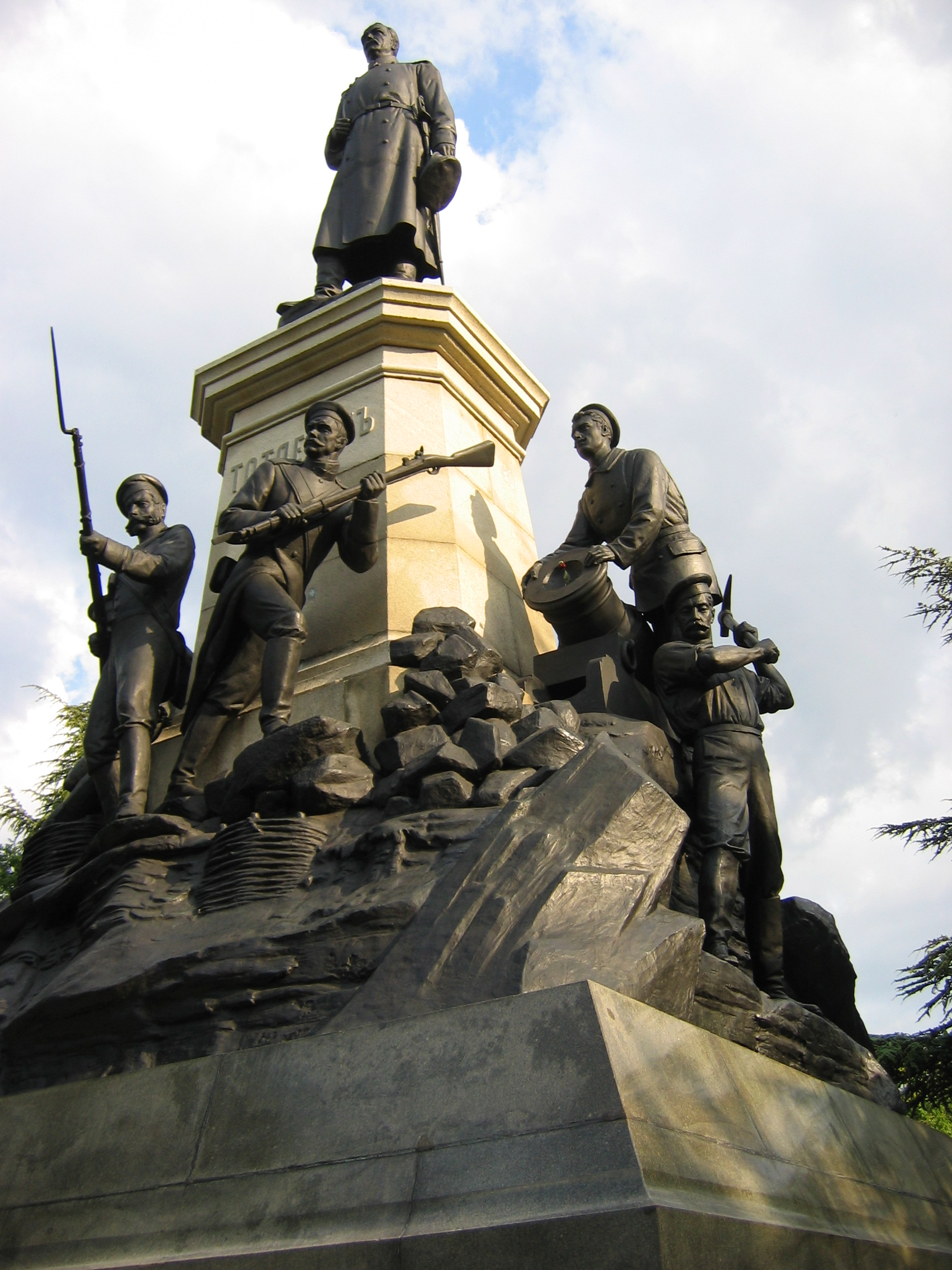
Totleben Monument in Sevastopol (1909).

At the outbreak of war between Russia and the Ottoman Empire in 1853, Totleben took part in the siege of Silistria, and after the siege was raised was transferred to the Crimea. In September 1854, an Anglo-French-Ottoman army landed in the Crimea with the aim of taking Sevastopol, the principal base of the Russian Black Sea fleet. Sevastopol, while strongly fortified toward the sea, was almost unprotected on the land side.

Totleben, though still a junior field officer, coordinated the defense. On his advice the Black Sea fleet was sunk, in order to block the mouth of the harbour, and the deficiency of fortifications on the land side was made good before the allies could take advantage of it. The construction of earthworks and redoubts was carried out in extreme haste and much of the artillery from the warships was transferred to them. Totleben originated the idea that a fortress should be considered not a walled town but an entrenched position, intimately connected with the offensive and defensive capacities of an army and as susceptible to alteration as the formation of troops in battle or manoeuvre.

Until 20 June 1855, Totleben conducted operations for the defense at Sevastopol in person; he was then wounded in the foot and was not present at the operations which immediately preceded the fall of the fortress. In the course of the siege he had risen from the rank of lieutenant-colonel to that of lieutenant-general, and had also been made aide-de-camp to the tsar. When he recovered he was employed in strengthening the fortifications at the mouth of the Dnieper, and also those of Kronstadt. In 1864, he suggested further improvements of the Brest Fortress that were implemented between then and 1868.

On 24 March 1854, Russian novelist Fyodor Dostoyevsky wrote to Totleben asking for his help in returning to European Russia. Dostoyevsky had been sentenced to four years of banishment in Siberia. Totleben's brother Adolf had been Dostoyevsky's classmate at the school of military engineering in Saint Petersburg.

=== Russo-Turkish War, 1877–78 ===
In 1860 Totleben was appointed assistant to Grand Duke Nicholas, and he subsequently became head of the department of engineers with the full rank of general. He received no command when another war against the Ottoman Empire began in 1877. Only after the early Russian reverses before Plevna was he called to the front. He saw that it would be necessary to draw engineering works around Osman Pasha and cut him off from communication with the other Turkish commanders. In due time, Plevna fell. Totleben then undertook the siege of the Bulgarian fortresses. After the conclusion of the preliminaries of peace, he was placed in command of the whole Russian army.

== Later life ==
After the war Totleben was assigned to be Governor General of Bessarabia and Novorossiya. He also became a hereditary Count. In 1880, he held the post of Governor General of Vilna. He died in 1884 at Bad Soden near Frankfurt am Main, and is buried in Sevastopol.

The village of Totleben in Pordim Municipality, Pleven Province, is named after him, in honour of his decisive role in the Siege of Plevna of 1877.

== Sources ==
- "Тотлебен, Эдуард Иванович" . Brockhaus and Efron Encyclopedic Dictionary (in Russian). 1906.
