= Knezha =

Knezha Кнежа
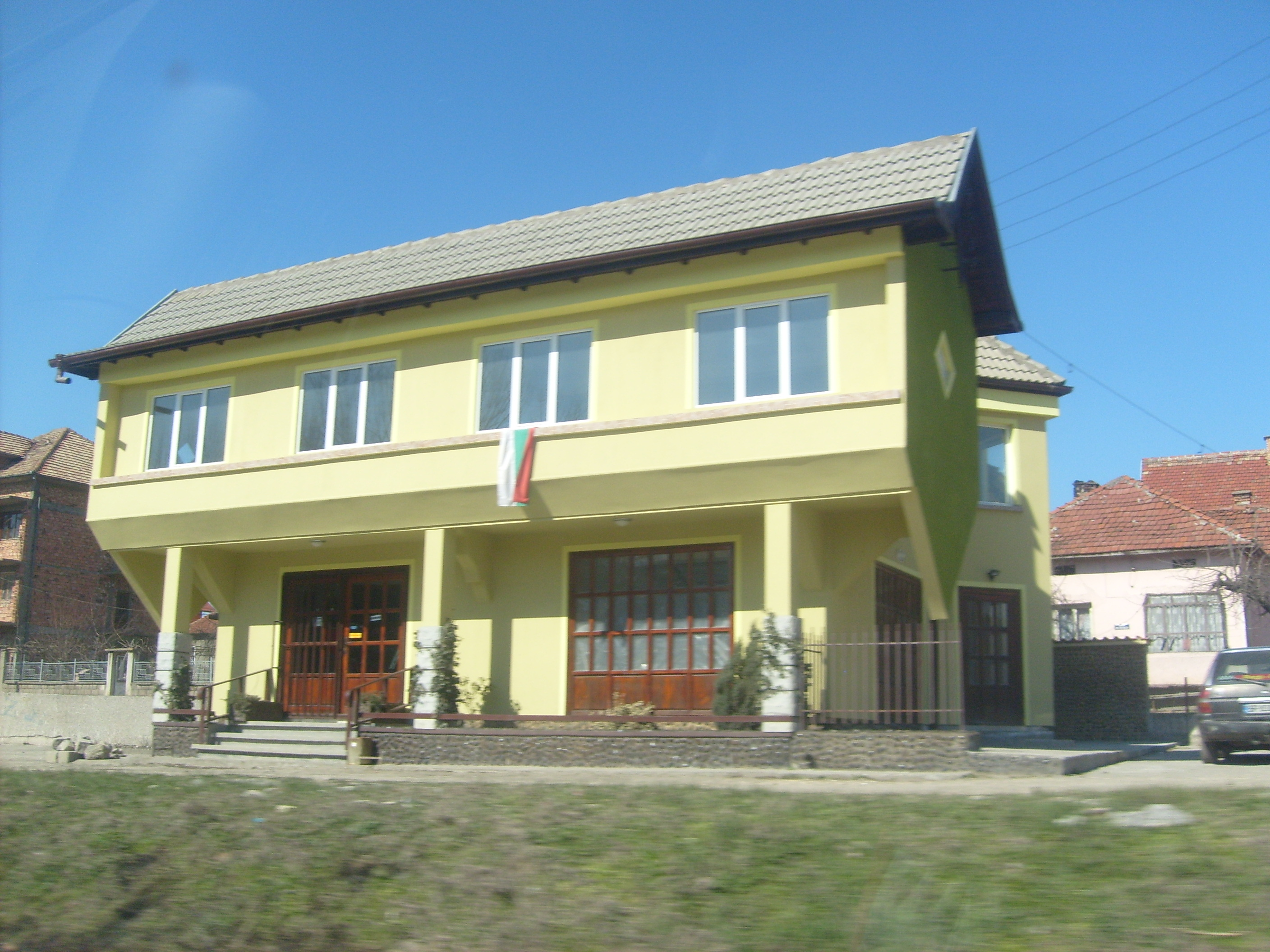

- Location of Knezha
- Coordinates: 43°30′N 24°5′E
- Country: Bulgaria
- Province (Oblast): Pleven

Government
  - Mayor: Iliycho Lachovski
- Elevation: 136 m (446 ft)

Population (2020)
  - Total: 10,490
- Time zone: UTC+2 (EET)
  - Summer (DST): UTC+3 (EEST)
- Postal Code: 5835
- Area code: 09132

Knezha (Bulgarian: Кнежа, pronounced [knɛˈʒa]) is a town in Pleven Province, Northern Bulgaria. It is the administrative center of the homonymous Knezha Municipality.

== History ==
The town's name is most probably derived from the Slavic word knyaz ("prince, duke"), most likely after a local ruler that defended the population in the area during the Ottoman rule of Bulgaria. Knezha is the third-largest town in the province, after Pleven and Cherven Bryag, and is the administrative centre of a municipality. The town was located in Vratsa province until 2001, when a boundary change shifted the town into Pleven province.

A local landmark is the 17-metre (56 ft) steel Christian cross constructed on a hill overlooking the town. The cross' construction was financed entirely by donations. It has luminescent lighting bodies attached to it and is illuminated in blue at night. The cross is similar to the larger Millennium Cross above Skopje. Knezha also has a historical museum and an amateur theatre performing in the local community centre (chitalishte). The Institute on Maize of the Agricultural Academy is based in Knezha; it was founded in 1924.

== Notable people ==
Notable natives include weightlifter and Sydney 2000 Olympic gold medalist Galabin Boevski (b. 1974), Bulgaria international footballer Valentin Iliev (b. 1980), and Bulgarian Army general and long-time Chairman of the National Assembly of Bulgaria Ferdinand Kozovski (1892–1965).

== Gallery ==
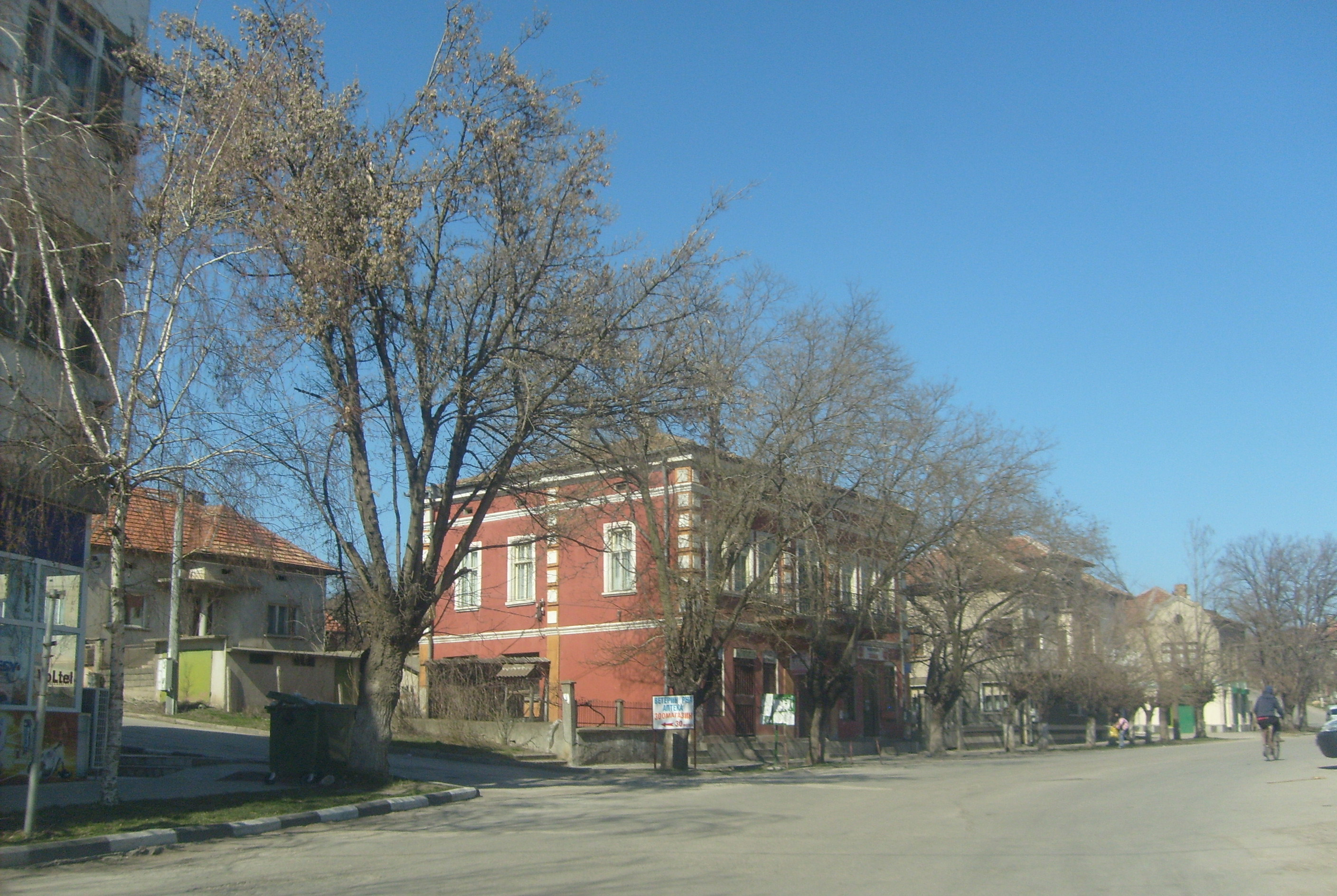

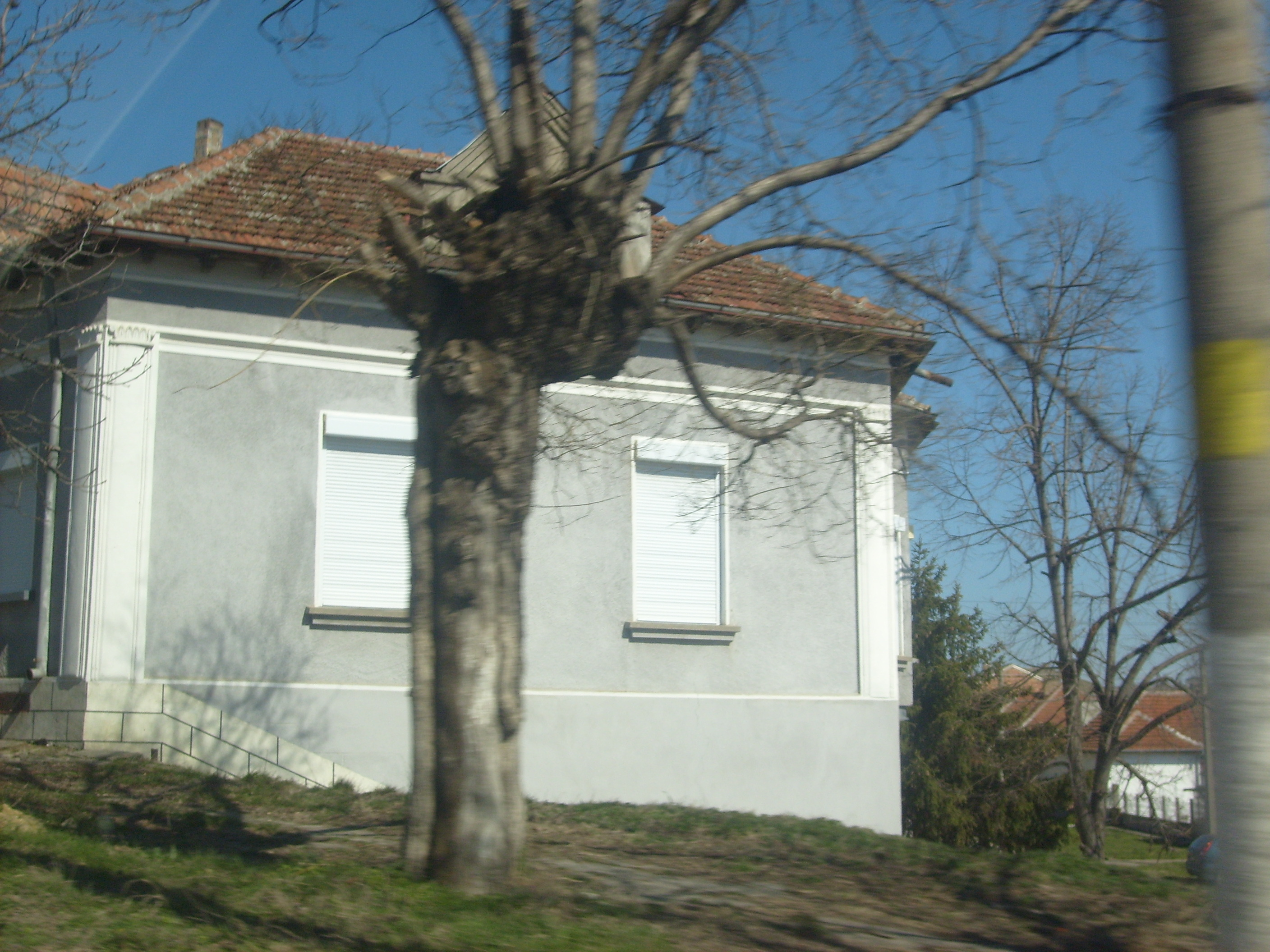

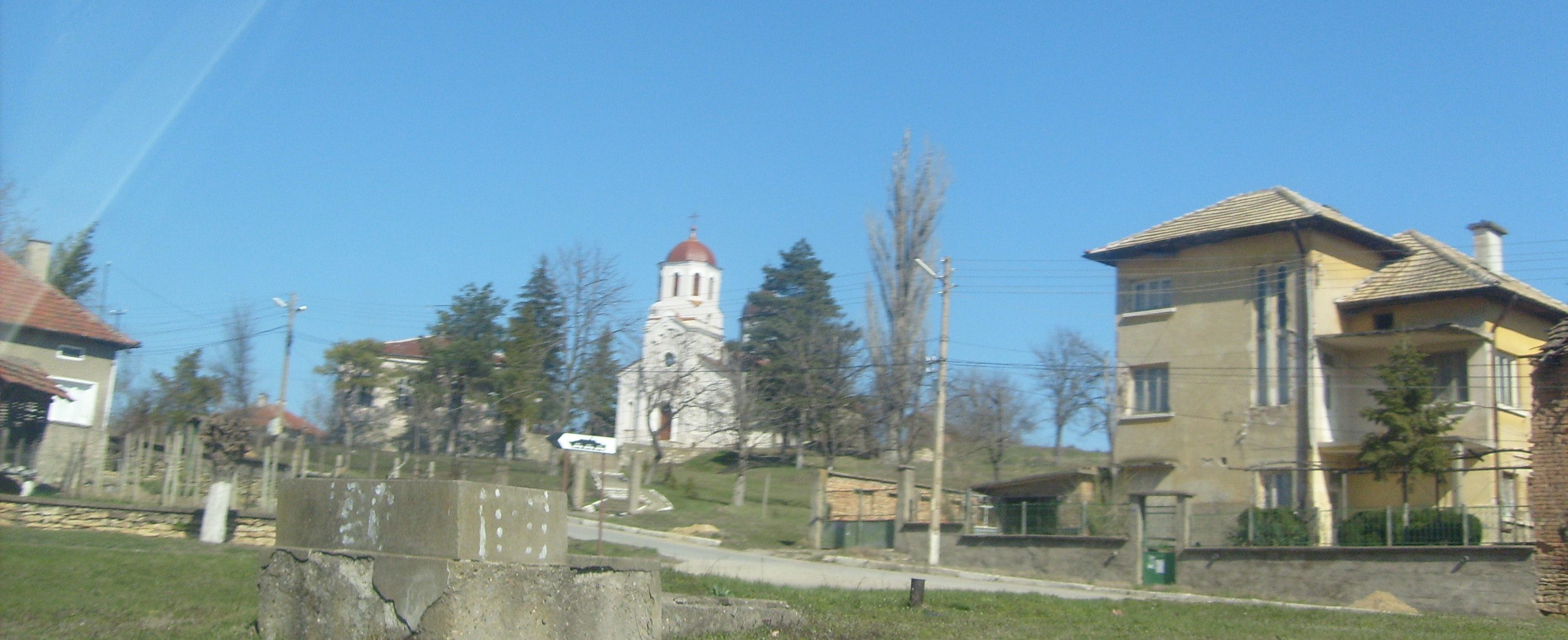

== Climate ==
Knezha has a continental climate (Dfb) with hot summers and cold winters, and relatively large temperature variations.

Climate data for Knezha, Bulgaria(1970-2004)
Month	Jan	Feb	Mar	Apr	May	Jun	Jul	Aug	Sep	Oct	Nov	Dec	Year
Record high °C (°F)	20 (68)	20.8 (69.4)	35.7 (96.3)	32 (90)	36.5 (97.7)	38.2 (100.8)	41.2 (106.2)	42.7 (108.9)	41.6 (106.9)	37.4 (99.3)	27.9 (82.2)	21.6 (70.9)	42.7 (108.9)
Mean daily maximum °C (°F)	2.5 (36.5)	5.5 (41.9)	11.5 (52.7)	17.8 (64.0)	23.7 (74.7)	27.0 (80.6)	29.4 (84.9)	29.5 (85.1)	24.1 (75.4)	17.9 (64.2)	9.7 (49.5)	4.1 (39.4)	16.9 (62.4)
Daily mean °C (°F)	−1.3 (29.7)	0.8 (33.4)	6.2 (43.2)	12.0 (53.6)	17.6 (63.7)	20.8 (69.4)	23.2 (73.8)	23.3 (73.9)	18.2 (64.8)	12.7 (54.9)	5.4 (41.7)	0.2 (32.4)	11.6 (52.9)
Mean daily minimum °C (°F)	−5.1 (22.8)	−4.0 (24.8)	0.8 (33.4)	6.2 (43.2)	11.5 (52.7)	14.6 (58.3)	16.8 (62.2)	16.9 (62.4)	12.3 (54.1)	7.5 (45.5)	1.1 (34.0)	−3.7 (25.3)	6.3 (43.3)
Record low °C (°F)	−35.5 (−31.9)	−32 (−26)	−30.2 (−22.4)	−7.5 (18.5)	−1.5 (29.3)	6.3 (43.3)	9.5 (49.1)	8.8 (47.8)	−2.7 (27.1)	−7.4 (18.7)	−15.4 (4.3)	−28.2 (−18.8)	−35.5 (−31.9)
Average precipitation mm (inches)	33 (1.3)	25 (1.0)	41 (1.6)	55 (2.2)	64 (2.5)	72 (2.8)	60 (2.4)	42 (1.7)	45 (1.8)	40 (1.6)	43 (1.7)	38 (1.5)	557 (21.9)
Source: Stringmeteo
