= Pordim Municipality =

Pordim Municipality Община Пордим
- Municipality
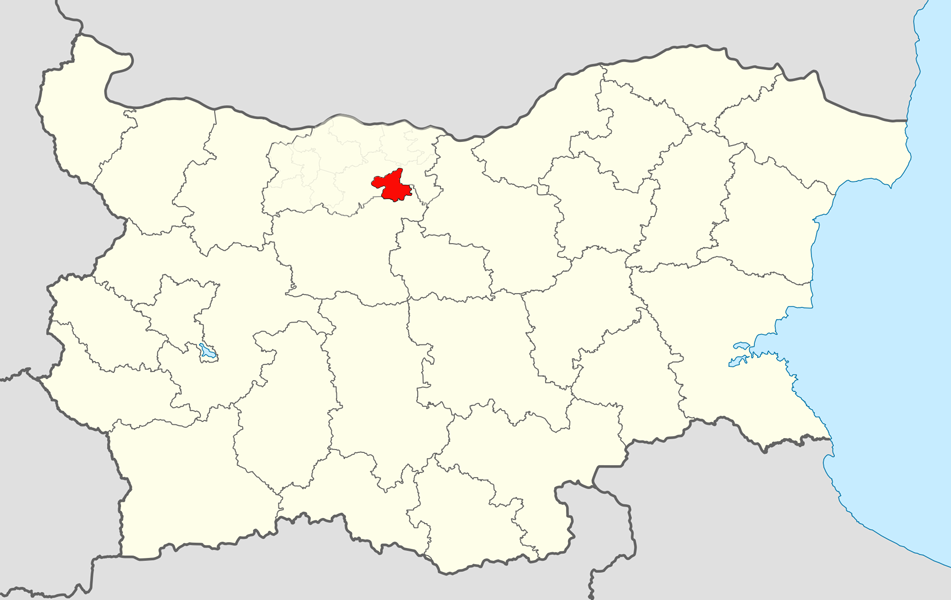
- Pordim Municipality within Bulgaria and Pleven Province.
- Coordinates: 43°22′N 24°55′E
- Country: Bulgaria
- Province (Oblast): Pleven
- Admin. centre (Obshtinski tsentar): Pordim

Area
  - Total: 255 km^{2} (98 sq mi)

Population (December 2009)
  - Total: 7,114
  - Density: 27.9/km^{2} (72.3/sq mi)
- Time zone: UTC+2 (EET)
  - Summer (DST): UTC+3 (EEST)

Pordim Municipality (Bulgarian: Община Пордим) is a municipality (obshtina) in Pleven Province, Northern Bulgaria. It is named after its administrative centre - the town of Pordim.

The municipality embraces a territory of 255 km^{2} (98 sq mi) with a population, as of December 2009, of 7,114 inhabitants.

== Settlements ==
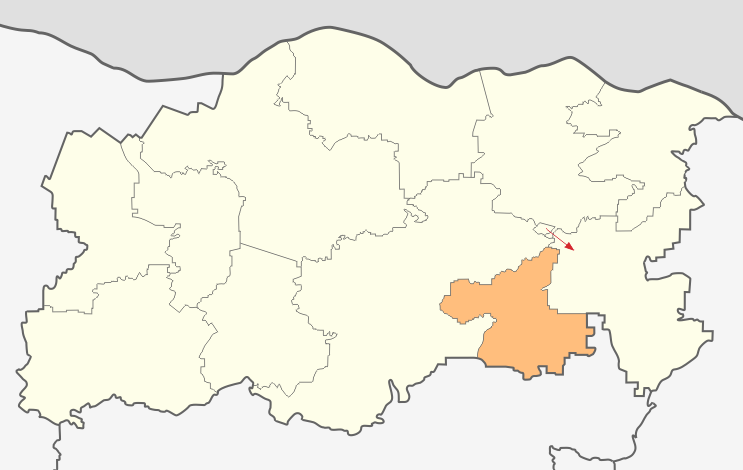
Pordim Municipality within Pleven Province

(towns are shown in bold):

Town/Village	Cyrillic	Population (December 2009)
**Pordim**	**Пордим**	2,117
Borislav	Борислав	278
Valchitran	Вълчитрън	1,102
Zgalevo	Згалево	682
Kamenets	Каменец	972
Kateritsa	Катерица	91
Odarne	Одърне	1,057
Totleben	Тотлебен	815
Total		7,114

== Demography ==
The following table shows the change of the population during the last four decades.

Pordim Municipality
**Year**	1975	1985	1992	**2001**	2005	2007	2009	**2011**
**Population**	13,041	10,480	9,607	8,179	7,654	7,420	7,114	...
Sources: Census 2001, Census 2011, „pop-stat.mashke.org“,

=== Religion ===
According to the latest Bulgarian census of 2011, the religious composition, among those who answered the optional question on religious identification, was the following:

Religious composition of Pordim Municipality
Orthodox Christianity	83.7%
Catholicism	0.5%
Protestantism	0.0%
Islam	2.4%
No religion	9.5%
Prefer not to answer, others and indefinable	3.9%

== See also ==
- Provinces of Bulgaria
- Municipalities of Bulgaria
- List of cities and towns in Bulgaria
