= Totleben, Bulgaria =

Village in Pordim municipality, Bulgaria

Coordinates: 43°26′00″N 24°59′00″E

Totleben (Bulgarian: Тотлебен [ˈtɔtlɛbɛn]) is a village in Pordim Municipality, in the Pleven region of Bulgaria, situated in the Danube valley, on the left bank of the river Osam.

== Geography ==
Totleben is located 25 km (16 mi) northeast of the city of Pleven, next to the E83 highway Sofia-Pleven-Ruse. The village is situated on a small creek that leads back to the land of Slavyanovo. Rich springs is his area. There are south-east - an important prerequisite for life, because this region is characterized by strong westerly winds. Totleben village and its lands are located in the basin of the river Osam. The terrain is flat, with fertile black soil.

== History ==
The village is named after the famous Baltic German Russian military engineer general Eduard I. Totleben.

Favourable living conditions have attracted the attention of people from ancient times to testify that found the remains of dwellings, vessels, coins, other objects and building materials. It is assumed that they remained in villages, probably since the Thracian and Roman times. 1.6 kilometres (1 mi) from the village there are remains of another village, where they found buildings with a balance of buildings and appliances, and pipes and residue drainage. This settlement was probably from the time of the Second Bulgarian Kingdom. Most findings suggest that this settlement was a fairly advanced culture. At the end of the 17th century the village had about 500 houses. This can be judged that all the places where buildings have been found contain remains of houses from that time. In the legends we may consider that it was one of the largest villages in this region. The people lived in dugouts, houses covered with straw yards that were surrounded by deep ditches. At the end of the 17th century during wars involving Turkey with its neighbors, plague appeared. The plague spread rapidly and caused a large portion of the population to leave the village, seeking salvation from the terrible disease. The plague was so large in scale that at the beginning of the epidemic people burned their dead families in the dugouts, and then only the trees that held the doors were buried with the inhabitants under the rubble of the houses. The village was completely depopulated. For 12 years the village did not have a single inhabitant. After 12 years people began to return to their home areas. In the early 18th century there were between 15 and 17 houses in the village. Families then consisted of 50-60 people. The village was attacked several times by the hordes of Kardzhali, but was saved through ransom. By eradicating the population again kardzhaliystvoto returned to the old places. New settlers began to food in, increasing the number of inhabitants. The first craftsman who grew up in the village is ancestor of today Boyadjievs - Ivancho grandfather who teaches craft in Lovech, dyed yarn spread in all villages of the region all the way to the town of Nikopol.

Reportedly Vasil Levski repeatedly visited and stayed at home in the village of Ivancho "Bojadjiata" (Ivancho the Painter).

In 1870 Vasil Levski established a revolutionary committee in the village.

In 1939 in the village Totleben the beginning of a cooperative movement in Bulgaria was established, founding the first agricultural cooperative in Bulgaria - Labor cooperative farms (farms) "Rise". In September 2009 in the village Totleben marked the 70th anniversary of its founding.

== Monuments ==
- Monument of General Engineering Totleben E. I. (1960)
- Memorial-ossuary of the dead Russian soldiers deployed in the village in two military hospital in Totleben village during the Russo-Turkish War 1878-1879
- Monument to Russian-Bulgarian friendship (1979), depicting a Russian soldier and a Bulgarian girl

== Education and culture ==
In 1903, a Library/Cultural club - Chitalishte "Probuda"(Revival) in Totleben village was established by 19 citizens of the village (Founder Ivan D. Tanchev - chairman, Grigor Ivanov Boyadjiev - Vice-Chairman, Varbi Georgiev - clerk). In 1932 the Minister of Education Konstantin Muraviev visited Totleben. In [1940] poets Kalina Malina and Elissaveta Bagryana visited Totleben village and read their poems in the hall of the old Library/Cultural club "Probuda", located at the place of the home for children and adolescents at school "St.St. Cyril and Methodius". The new building of the library is built and opened in 1958 (President Mladen Antonov, Mayor K. Blazhev). In 1962 the writer Nikolay Haytov visited the village with the Pleven Theatre, which then played the first produced in Bulgaria piece of the writer. In the 1960s and 1970s the Library/Cultural club - Chitalishte "Probuda" has been visited repeatedly with their performances Pleven Theatre, magician Fakira Miti and many others. To the library/Cultural club "Probuda" was established and operates an extensive library.

The Primary School "St. Cyril and Methodius". In 1959 a Social Home for Children and Teenagers to the School was established. It was the first similar social home in the Pleven region.

In 1962 the first in Bulgaria Primary Logopedic School (Speech therapy School) with Boarding houses was established. It was opened until 2002. Now it is only a Social Home for children deprived of parental care. From 2006 the Foundation "Mladen and Maria Antonovi" is working for reviving of the former Logopedic School.

In 1961 the Minister of Education Nacho Papazov visited the Home for Children and Adolescents in Totleben. In 1987 the Minister of Education Prof. Ilcho Dimitrov visited Totleben. In 2010 the Minister of Education, Youth and Science Prof. Sergei Ignatov visited Totleben and Home for children deprived of parental care "Mladen Antonov".

== Base ==
Built and opened in 1980 the main building of the Primary Speech Therapy (Logopedic) Boarding-School is one of the last built school buildings in the country. Its campus is a modern base – school complex with a specialized Logopedic children garden, two boarding-schools, and one-floor building for the elementary classes and the main three-floor-building of the former Logopedic Boarding-School. The Boarding-School sat in a wide building, built in an ecologically clear area with easy access to the main town Pleven and with the other centers in the region. The Primary Logopedic Boarding-School has a base with cabinets for individual language therapy as well as geography, biology, chemistry, physics, foreign languages laboratories, imitative fine arts, cinema and sports hall, a library, mechanical and woodtuming workshops.

== Social activities ==
In 1960 the first in the Pleven region Social Home for children and teenagers was established to the Primary School "St.St. Cyril and Methodius".

In 1962 the Primary Logopedic Boarding-School in Totleben village was established. This Hall is also to Logopedic school in Totleben village. The two boarding houses to it in the building of the local municipal council, and built galleys and pensions. In the 1980s, around 500 children with speech problems of the whole country and from poor and large families in the county are placed in three boarding and training in two schools in the village. The successor of the Logopedic boarding school is the Home for children deprived of parental care (DDLRG) Mladen Antonov for children 3 to 18 years. The Social Home for children deprived of parental care is named after its founder Mladen Antonov (1929–1985), where about 120 children aged from 3 to 18 are being placed by the social legislation from Pleven region.

On 10 December 2012 the renovated Home for children deprived of parental care "Mladen Antonov" in the village Totleben was opened. The Home was renovated under the project funded by the Operational Programme "Rural Development from 2007 to 2013" State Fund "Agriculture", Measure 321 "Basic services for the economy and rural areas."

== Cooperative movement ==
In 1939 the citizens of the village established the first Bulgarian agriculture cooperation "Vazhod" (Progress). First president of the agricultural cooperative is the agronomist Pantaley Angelov Konstantinov (25/06/1903 at Totleben - died after 1983).In September 2009 in Totleben village the 70th anniversary of the first Bulgarian agriculture cooperation "Vazhod" was celebrated.

== Religion ==
In 1934-35, the orthodox church "St. George" has been built.

== Celebrations ==
Especially reputable holiday is St. George's Day (Bulg. Гергьовден -Gergiovden) as well as the next day - 7 May, when is the traditional fair of the village.

Annual celebration the anniversary of general Eduard I. Totleben (8 May 1818 – 18 June 1884) in every first Saturday of May

1. May 3, 2008 - Celebrating 190 years since the birth of General Totleben organized by the village mayor Ivan P. Ivanov, accompanied by a rich folklore program - Holiday "Merry Gergyovden
2. May 2, 2009 - Celebrating 191st Anniversary of General Totleben organized by the village mayor Ivan P. Ivanov, accompanied by a rich folklore program (St. George Merry, 2009) and restoration of historic scenes from the Russian-Turkish war involving General Totleben
3. May 1, 2010 - Celebrating 192nd Anniversary of General Totleben organized by the village mayor Emil Gashev accompanied with rich folklore program, concert brass, old town songs and romances, and rock concert
4. May 7, 2011 - celebration of the 193rd anniversary of General Totleben organized by the mayor of the village Emil Gashev, which was accompanied by a rich folklore show, rock concert - the group Vatican, Vasko Krypkata (Vasko the Patch) and others

== Others ==
Club for Horse Riding named after general Totleben (1998), founded by Krasimir Antonov. Races have been performed in the village over several years.
