= Pleven Province =

Province in northern Bulgaria

Coordinates: 43°25′N 24°40′E

Pleven Province Област Плевен
- Province
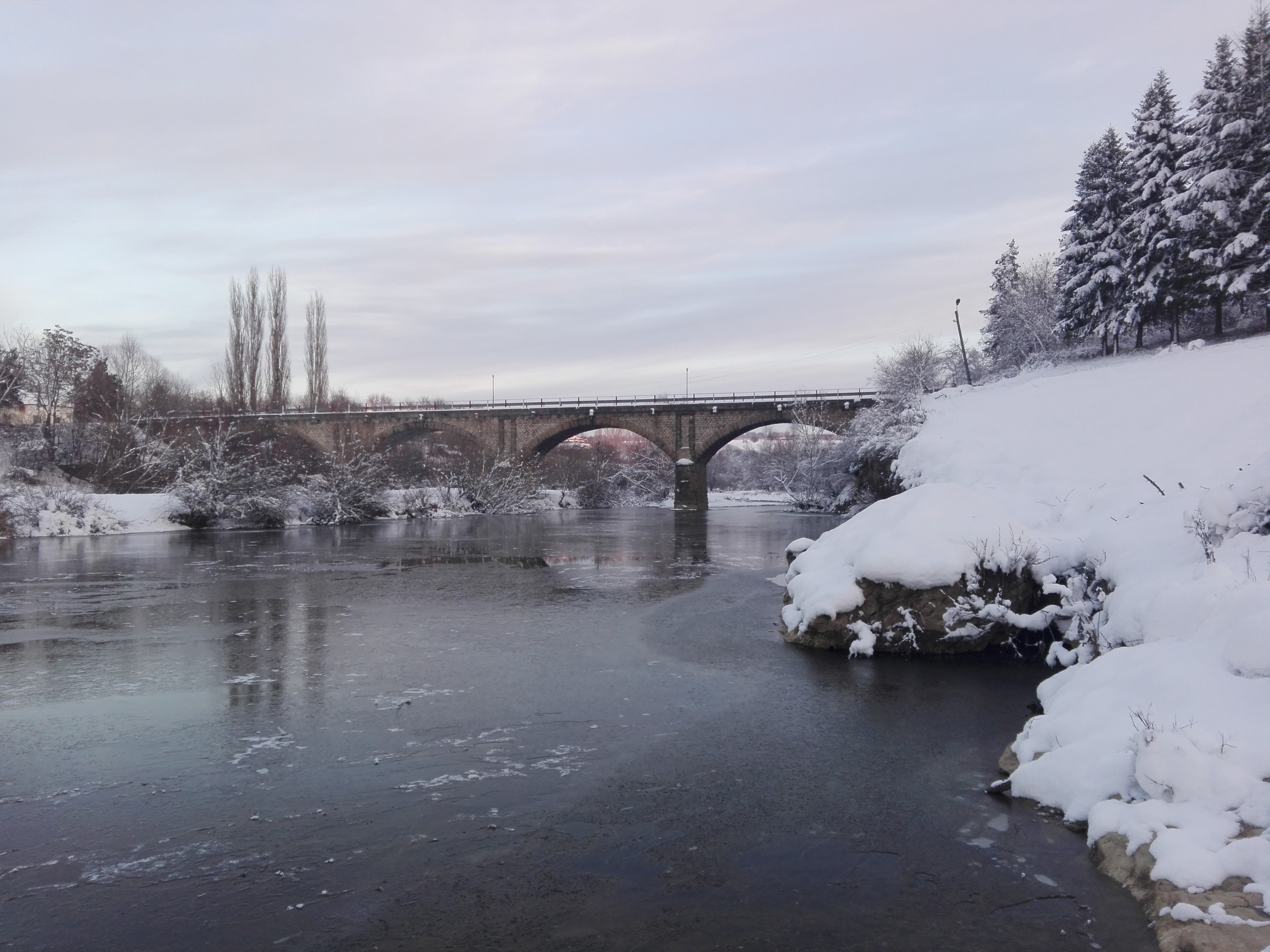
- Vit River

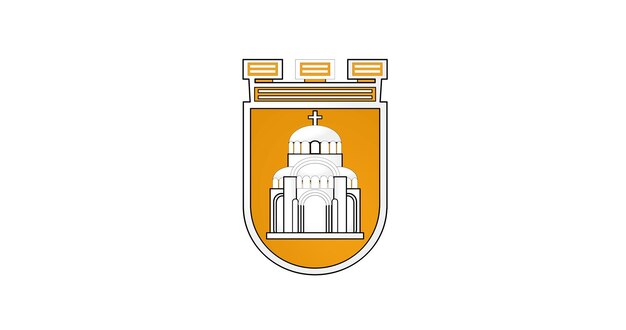
- Flag

- Location of Pleven Province in Bulgaria
- Country: Bulgaria
- Capital: Pleven
- Municipalities: Belene, Gulyantsi, Dolna Mitropoliya, Dolni Dabnik, Levski, Nikopol, Iskar, Pleven, Pordim, Cherven Bryag, Knezha

Government
  - Governor: Miroslav Petrov

Area
  - Total: 4,653.32 km^{2} (1,796.66 sq mi)

Population (December 2022)
  - Total: 220,346
  - Density: 47.3524/km^{2} (122.642/sq mi)
- Time zone: UTC+2 (EET)
  - Summer (DST): UTC+3 (EEST)
- License plate: EH
- Website: www.pleven-oblast.bg

Pleven Province (Bulgarian: Област Плевен or Плевенска Област) is a province located in central northern Bulgaria, bordering the Danube river, Romania and the Bulgarian provinces of Vratsa, Veliko Tarnovo and Lovech. It is divided into 11 subdivisions, called municipalities, that embrace a territory of 4,653.32 km^{2} (1,796.66 sq mi) with a population, as of February 2011, of 269 752 inhabitants. The province's capital is the city of Pleven.

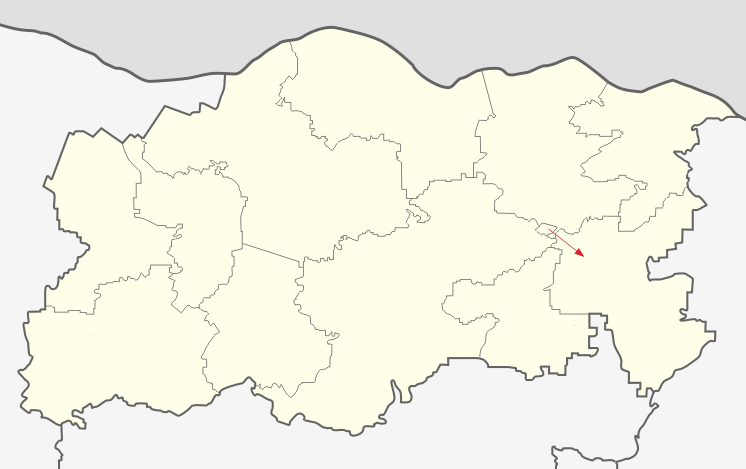

== Naming ==
The following Bulgarian terms may be used:

- Плевенска област (Plevenska oblast)
- Област Плевен (Oblast Pleven)
- Плевенски окръг (Plevenski okrag), obsolete
- Окръг Плевен (Okrag Pleven), obsolete

== Geography ==
The province is part of the central Danubian Plain. It is crossed from south to north by the rivers Iskar, Vit, and Osam (in west-east order); the river valleys are separated by limestone plateaus.

== Municipalities ==
The Pleven province (област, oblast) contains 11 municipalities (Bulgarian: община, romanized: obshtina - plural: общини, obshtini). The following table shows the names of each municipality in English and Cyrillic, the main town (in bold) or village, and the population of each as of December 2009.

Municipality	Cyrillic	Pop.	Town/Village	Pop.
Belene	Белене	10,908	Belene	8,905
Gulyantsi	Гулянци	13,561	Gulyantsi	3,432
Dolna Mitropoliya	Долна Митрополия	21,304	Dolna Mitropoliya	3,303
Dolni Dabnik	Долни Дъбник	14,438	Dolni Dabnik	4,761
Levski	Левски	21,487	Levski	10,571
Nikopol	Никопол	10,602	Nikopol	3,892
Iskar	Искър	7,717	Iskar	3,622
Pleven	Плевен	138,095	Pleven	111,426
Pordim	Пордим	7,114	Pordim	2,117
Cherven Bryag	Червен бряг	30,524	Cherven Bryag	13,856
Knezha	Кнежа	14,839	Knezha	11,191

== Demographics ==
Historical population
Year	Pop.	±%
1946	347,299	—
1956	358,270	+3.2%
1965	366,347	+2.3%
1975	394,734	+7.7%
1985	382,634	−3.1%
1992	365,254	−4.5%
2001	329,064	−9.9%
2011	269,752	−18.0%
2021	226,120	−16.2%
Source: pop-stat.mashke.org

As of February 2011, the population of the province, announced by the Bulgarian National Statistical Institute, numbered 266 144 of which 28.4% are inhabitants aged over 60 years.

=== Ethnic groups ===
Ethnic groups in Pleven Province (2011 census)
Ethnic group	Percentage
Bulgarians	91.4%
Romani	4.2%
Turks	3.6%
others and indefinable	0.8%

Total population (2011 census): 269,752

Ethnic groups (2011 census): Identified themselves 240,265 persons:

- Bulgarians: 219,612 (91,40%)
- Romani: 9,961 (4,15%)
- Turks: 8,666 (3,61%)
- Others and indefinable: 2,026 (0,84%)

A further 30,000 persons in Pleven Province did not declare their ethnic group at the 2011 census.

According to the 2001 census, the population of the province was 312,018, of which Bulgarians constitute an overwhelming majority of 280,475. 16,931 signed as Turks (though this number very likely also includes Muslim Roma) and 9,777 as Roma.

=== Languages ===
According to the 2001 census 283,626 people specified Bulgarian as their mother tongue, 14,947 declared to speak Turkish at home, while the native speakers of Romani were 8,861.

=== Religion ===
Religions in Pleven Province (2011 census)
Religious group	Percentage
Orthodox Christian	56.73%
Catholic Christian	1.9%
Muslim	1.77%
Protestant Christian	0.5%
others and indefinable	39%

Religious adherence in the province according to 2001 census:

Census 2001
religious adherence	population	%
Orthodox Christians	275,112	88.18%
Muslims	15,681	5.03%
Roman Catholics	7,065	2.26%
Protestants	548	0.18%
Other	1,301	0.42%
Religion not mentioned	12,278	3.93%
total	311,985	100%

== See also ==
- Provinces of Bulgaria
- List of villages in Pleven Province
