= Demographic history of Bulgaria =

This article presents the demographic history of Bulgaria. See Demographics of Bulgaria

== 31 December 1880 census ==
Religion
Religion	Number	%
Orthodox	1,404,409	69.9
Muslim	578,060	28.7
Judaism	14,342	0.7
Other	11,108	0.5
Total	2,007,919	100

Language
Language	Number	%
Bulgarian	1,345,507	67.0
Turkish	527,284	26.2
"Vlach" (Aromanian and Romanian)	49,064	2.4
Roma	37,600	1.8
Ladino	14,020	0.7
Tatar	12,376	0.6
Greek	11,152	0.6
Armenian	3,837	0.2
Serbo-Croatian	1,894	0.1
Yaddish	1,280	0.1
Russian	1,123	0.1
Albanian	530	0.0
Italian	515	0.0
Hungarian	220	0.0
Czech	174	0.0
French	164	0.0
Arab	97	0.0
Polish	92	0.0
English	64	0.0
Circassian	63	0.0
Persian	58	0.0
Others	402	0.0
Total	2,007,919	100

== 31 December 1887 census ==
Religion
Religion	Number	%
Orthodox	2,242,371	76.8
Muslim	676,215	21.4
Judaism	24,352	0.7
Roman Catholic	18,505	0.5
Armenian Gregorian	5,839	0.1
Protestant	1,358	0.0
Other	1,461	0.0
Undeclared	2,274	0.0
Total	3,154,375	100

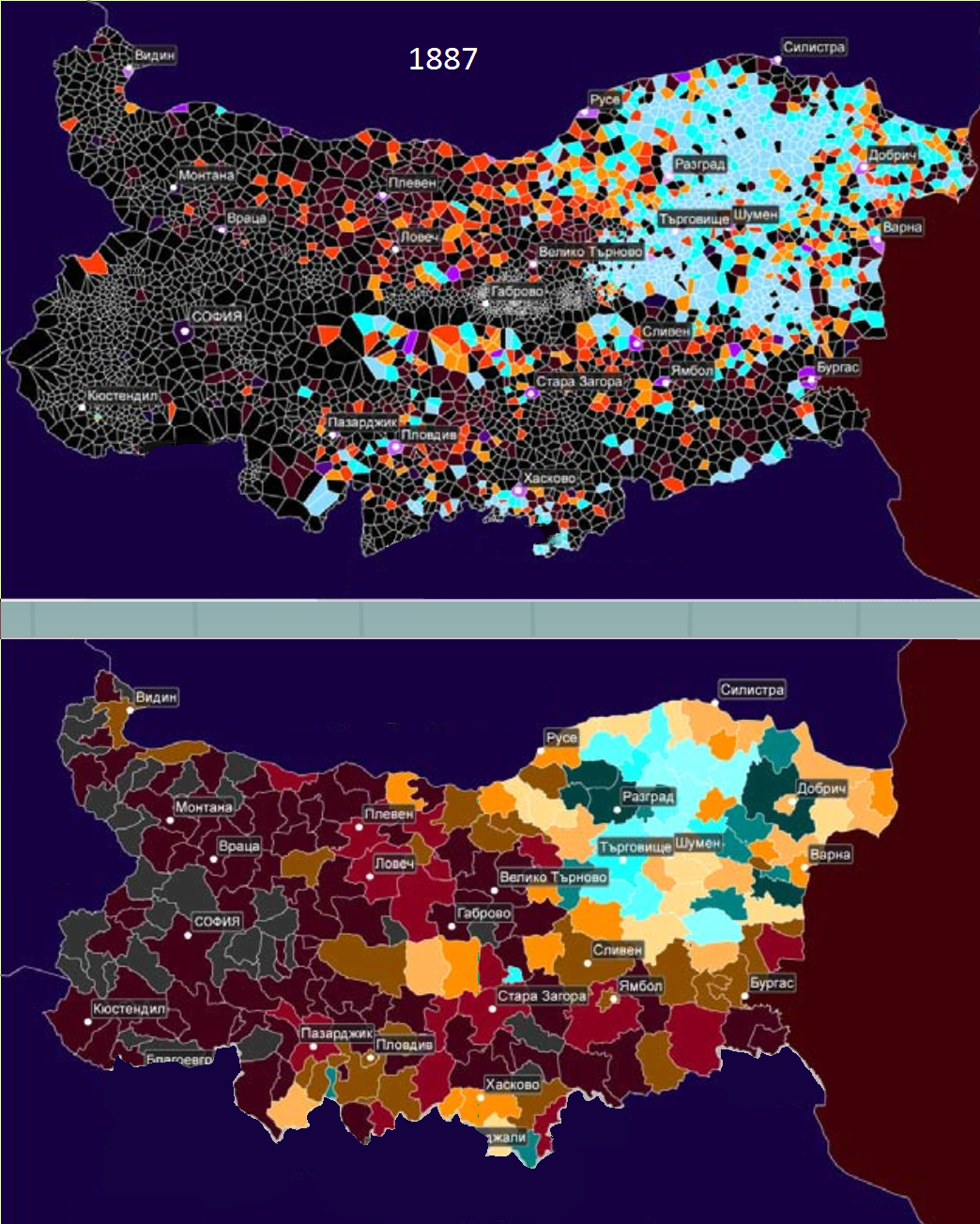
Share of the Turkish language as a native language in town halls, compared to the territories of daily municipalities.

Language
Language	Number	%
Bulgarian	2,326,250	73.7
Turkish	607,331	19.3
Greek	58,326	1.8
Roma	50,291	1.6
Other		
Total	3,154,375	100

== 31 December 1892 census ==
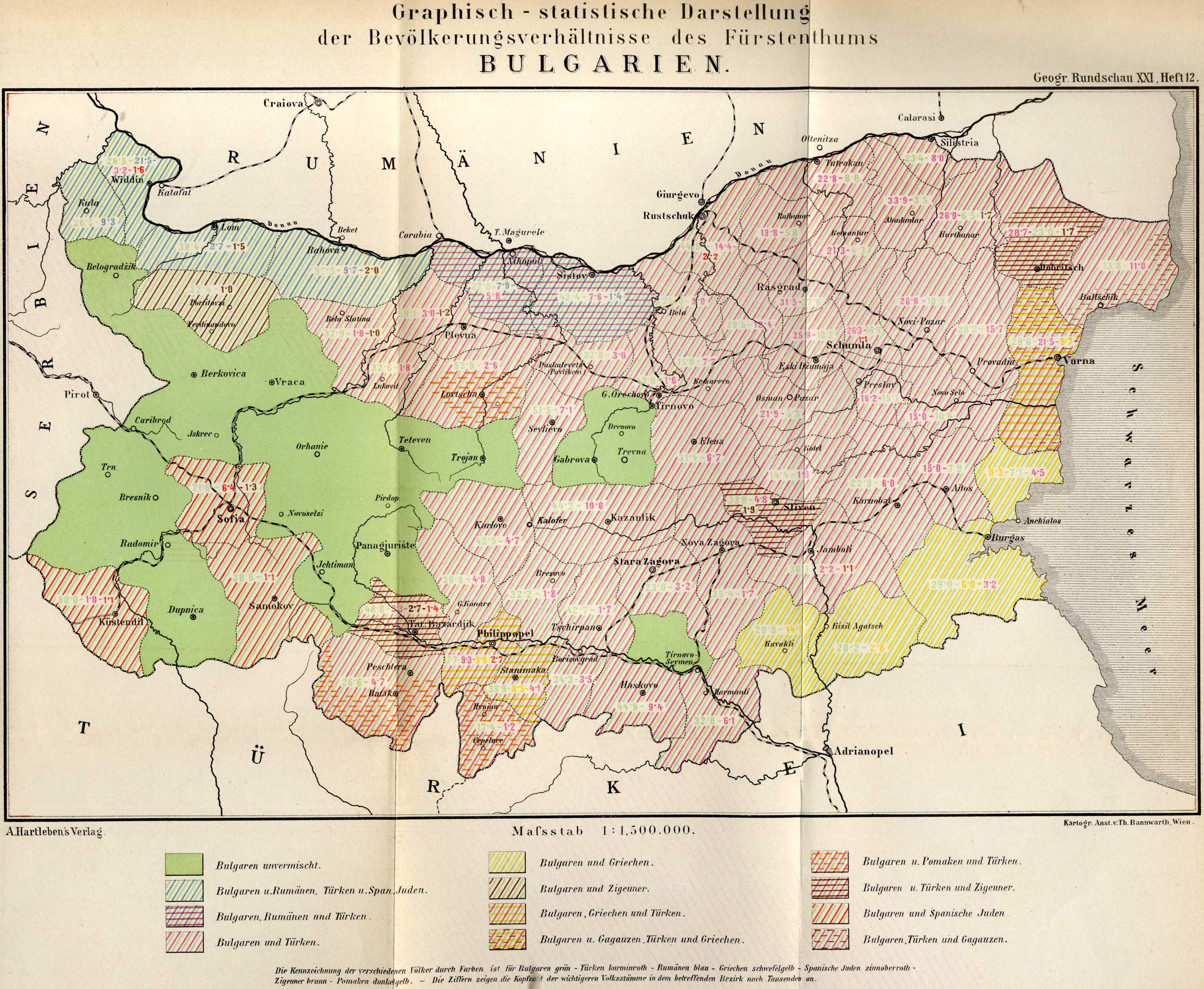
Ethnic map (1892)

Ethnic groups
Ethnic groups	Number	%
Bulgarians	2,505,243	75.66
Turks	558,364	16.86
Romanians	62,227	1.87
Greeks	58,296	1.76
Romani	51,946	1.56
Jews	21,777	0.83
Tatars	16,179	0.48
Gagauzes	9,520	0.28
Armenians	6,900	0.20
"Vlachs" (Aromanians, Romanians, Romanian-speaking Boyash)	733	0.02
Others	13,616	0.41
Total	3,310,810	100

Religion
Religion	Number	%
Orthodox	2,606,786	78.7
Muslim	643,258	19.4
Jewish	28,307	0.8
Roman Catholic	22,617	0.6
Armenian Grecorian	6,643	0.2
Protestant	2,384	0.0
Undeclared	718	0.0
Total	3,310,713	100

Language
Language	Number	%
Bulgarian	2,505,326	75.7
Turkish	569,728	17.2
Romanian	62,628	1.9
Greek	58,518	1.8
Roma	52,132	1.6
Ladino	27,531	0.8
Tatar	16,920	0.5
Armenian	6,445	0.2
German	3,620	0.1
Russian	928	0.0
Serbian	818	0.0
Italian	803	0.0
French	356	0.0
Others	4,425	0.1
Undeclared	1,165	0.0
Total	3,310,713	100

== 31 December 1900 census ==
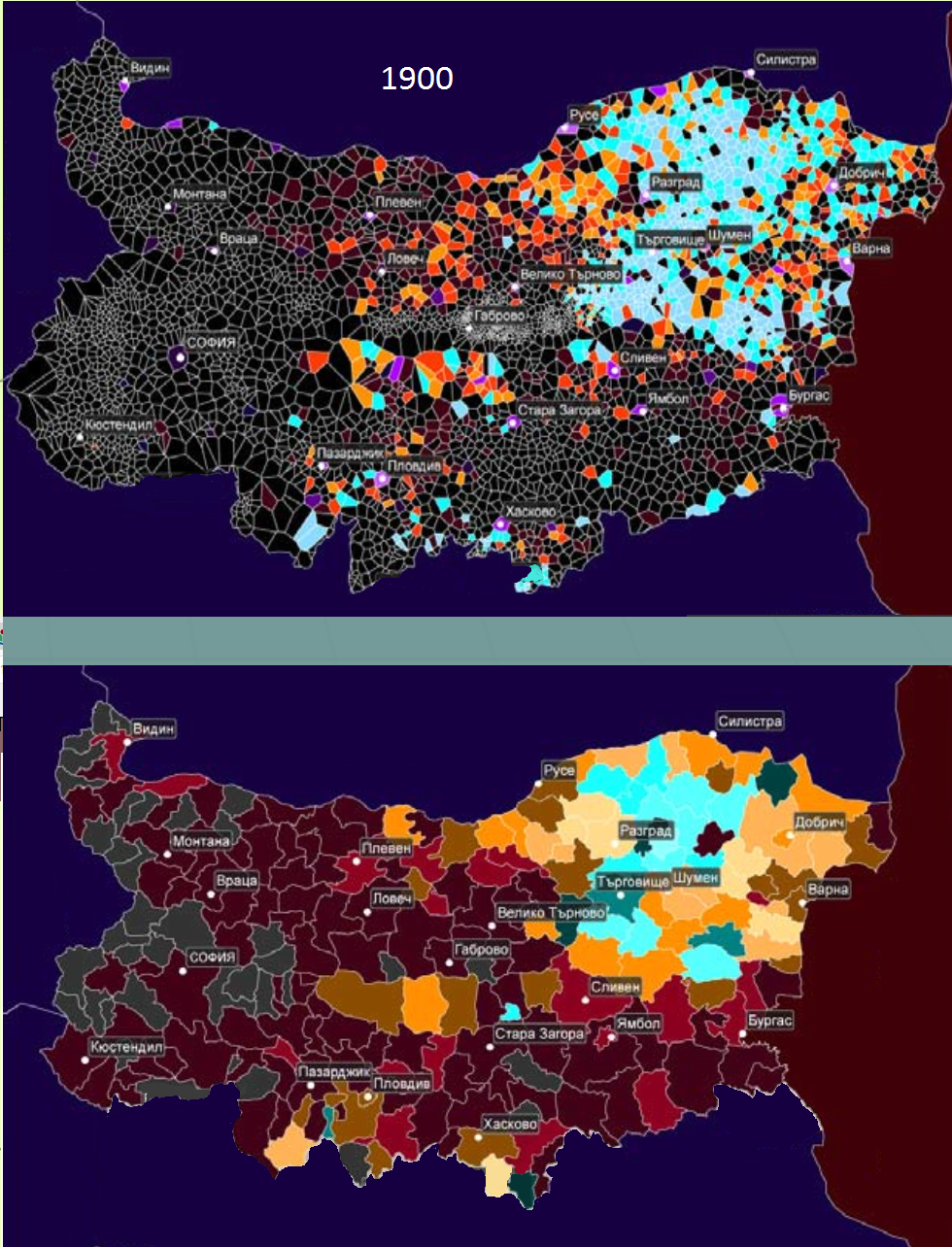
Share of Turks by town halls, compared to the territories of daily municipalities.

Ethnic groups
Ethnic groups	Number	%
Bulgarians	2,888,129	77.1
Turks	531,240	14.2
Romani	89,549	2.4
Romanians	71,063	1.9
Greeks	66,635	1.8
Jews	33,661	0.9
Tatars	19,884	0.5
Armenians	14,581	0.4
Russians	1,685	0.0
Total	3,744,283	100

Religion
Religion	Number	%
Orthodox	3,019,999	80.6
Muslim	643,300	17.1
Judaism	33,663	0.8
Roman Catholic	28,569	0.7
Armenian Grecorian	13,809	0.3
Protestant	4,524	0.1
Others	326	0.0
Undeclared	93	0.0
Total	3,744,283	100

== 31 December 1905 census ==
Ethnic groups
Ethnic groups	Number	%
Bulgarians	3,203,810	79.4
Turks	488,010	12.1
Romani	99,004	2.5
Romanians	75,773	1.9
Greeks	63,487	1.6
Jews	37,663	0.9
Tatars	17,942	0.4
Gagauzes	10,175	0.3
Sarakatsani	6,128	0.2
Russians	3,275	0.2
Total	4,035,575	100

== 31 December 1910 census ==
Ethnic groups
Ethnic groups	Numbers	%
Bulgarians	3,518,756	81.1
Turks	465,641	10.7
Romani	122,296	2.8
Romanians	79,429	1.8
Greeks	43,275	1.0
Jews	40,133	0.9
Tatars	18,228	0.4
Armenians	12,932	0.3
Sarakatsani	7,251	0.2
Russians	2,505	0.2
Total	4,337,513	100

Religion
Religion	Number	%
Orthodox	3,643,918	84.0
Muslim	602,078	13.8
Judaism	40,067	0.9
Roman Catholic	32,150	0.7
Armenian Grecorian	12,259	0.2
Protestant	6,335	0.1
Other/Undeclared	706	0.0
Total	4,337,513	100

== 31 December 1920 census ==
Ethnic groups
Ethnic groups	Numbers	%
Bulgarians	4,036,056	83.3
Turks	520,339	10.7
Romani	98,451	2.0
Romanians	57,312	1.2
Jews	43,209	0.9
Greeks	42,074	0.9
Armenians	11,509	0.2
Russians	9,080	0.2
Total	4,846,971	100

1. During the period 1910 – 1920 Bulgaria suffered physical loss of population as follows:

- About 140,000 died in the wars (Balkan War I, Balkan War II, World War I), mostly of reproductive age;
- About 276,000 people in Southern Dobruja, who cross into Romania, and more on the western outskirts, who cross into Serbia.

2. During the period 1910 – 1920 the population growth in Bulgaria was as follows:

- It is estimated that about 350,000 refugees were sent to Bulgaria, losing territories during the Balkan War ll and the World War I. It is known, however, that a large part of the refugees from the Aegean and Edirne Thrace returned to their native places after the first wave, after which they immigrated to Bulgaria again in 1923;
- Bulgaria includes new suburbs won during the Balkan War I and the World War I – Pirin Macedonia and parts of the Rhodopes and Thrace.

Religion
Religion	Number	%
Orthodox	4,062,097	83.8
Muslim	690,734	14,2
Judaism	43,232	0.8
Roman Catholic	34,072	0.7
Armenian Grecorian	10,848	0.2
Protestant	5,617	0.1
Other/Undeclared	371	0.0
Total	4,846,971	100

== 31 December 1926 census ==
Ethnic groups
Ethnic groups	Number	%
Bulgarians	4,557,706	83.2
Turks	577,552	10.5
Romani	134,844	2.5
Romanians	69,080	1.2
Jews	46,558	0.8
Armenians	27,332	0.5
Russians	19,706	0.4
Greeks	10,564	0.2
Tatars	6,191	0.1
Gagauzes	4,362	0.1
Total	5,528,741	100

Religion
Religion	Number	%
Orthodox	4,569,074	83.3
Muslim	789,296	14.4
Judaism	46,431	0.8
Roman Catholic	40,347	0.7
Armenian Grecorian	25,402	0.4
Protestant	6,735	0.1
Other/Undeclared	1,456	0.0
Total	5,478,741	100

== 31 December 1934 census ==
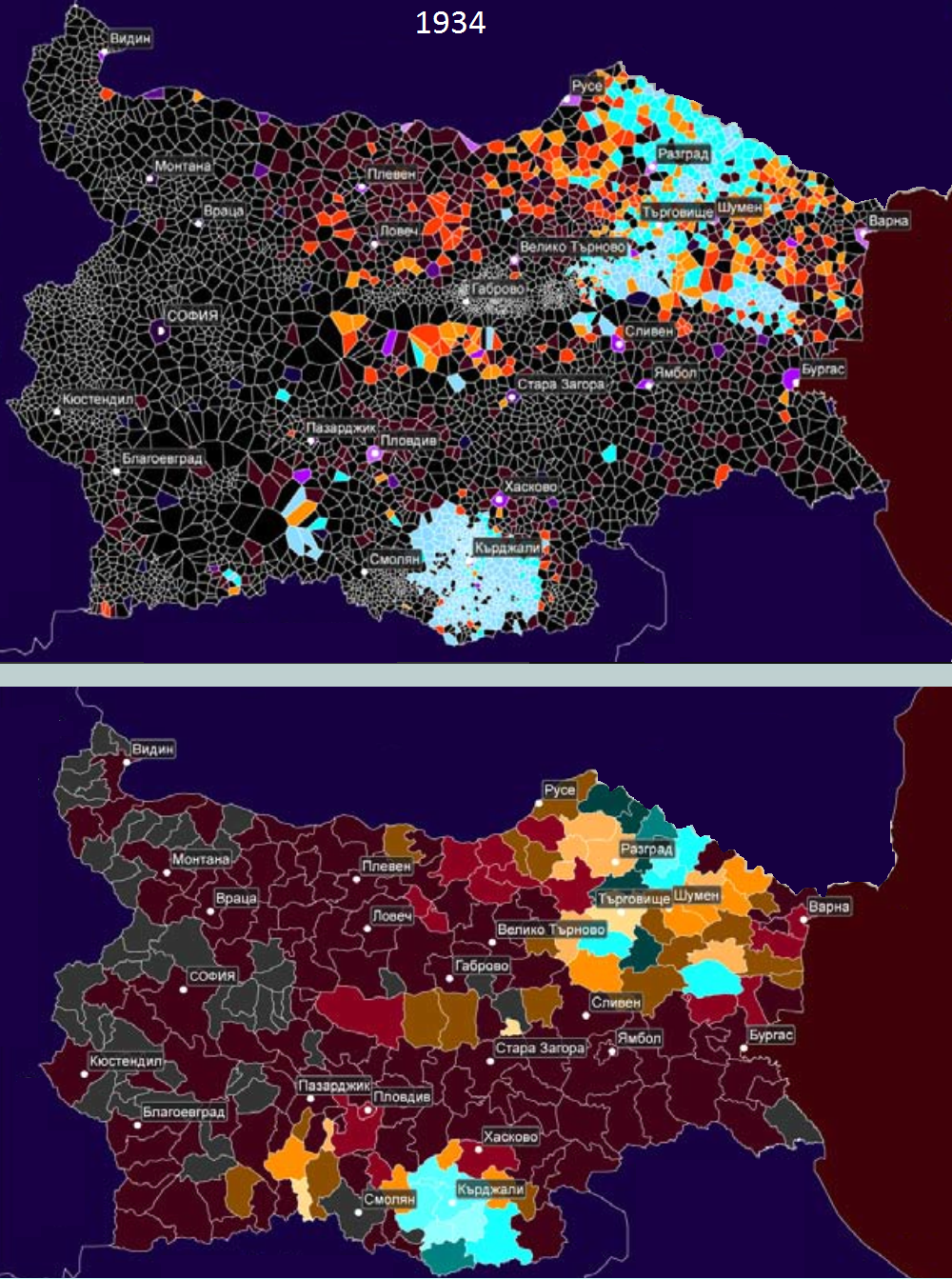
Share of Turks by town halls, compared to the territories of daily municipalities.

Ethnic groups
Ethnic groups	Number	%
Bulgarians	5,204,217	85.6
Turks	591,193	9.7
Romani	149,385	2.5
Jews	48,565	0.8
Armenians	25,963	0.4
Romanians	16,504	0.3
Russians	11,928	0.2
Greeks	9,601	0.2
Total	6,077,939	100

Religion
Religion	Number	%
Orthodox	5,128,890	84.3
Muslim	821,298	13.5
Judaism	48,398	0.7
Roman Catholic	45,704	0.7
Armenian Grecorian	23,476	0.3
Protestant	8,371	0.1
Other/Undeclared	1,802	0.0
Total	6,077,939	100

== 31 December 1946 census ==
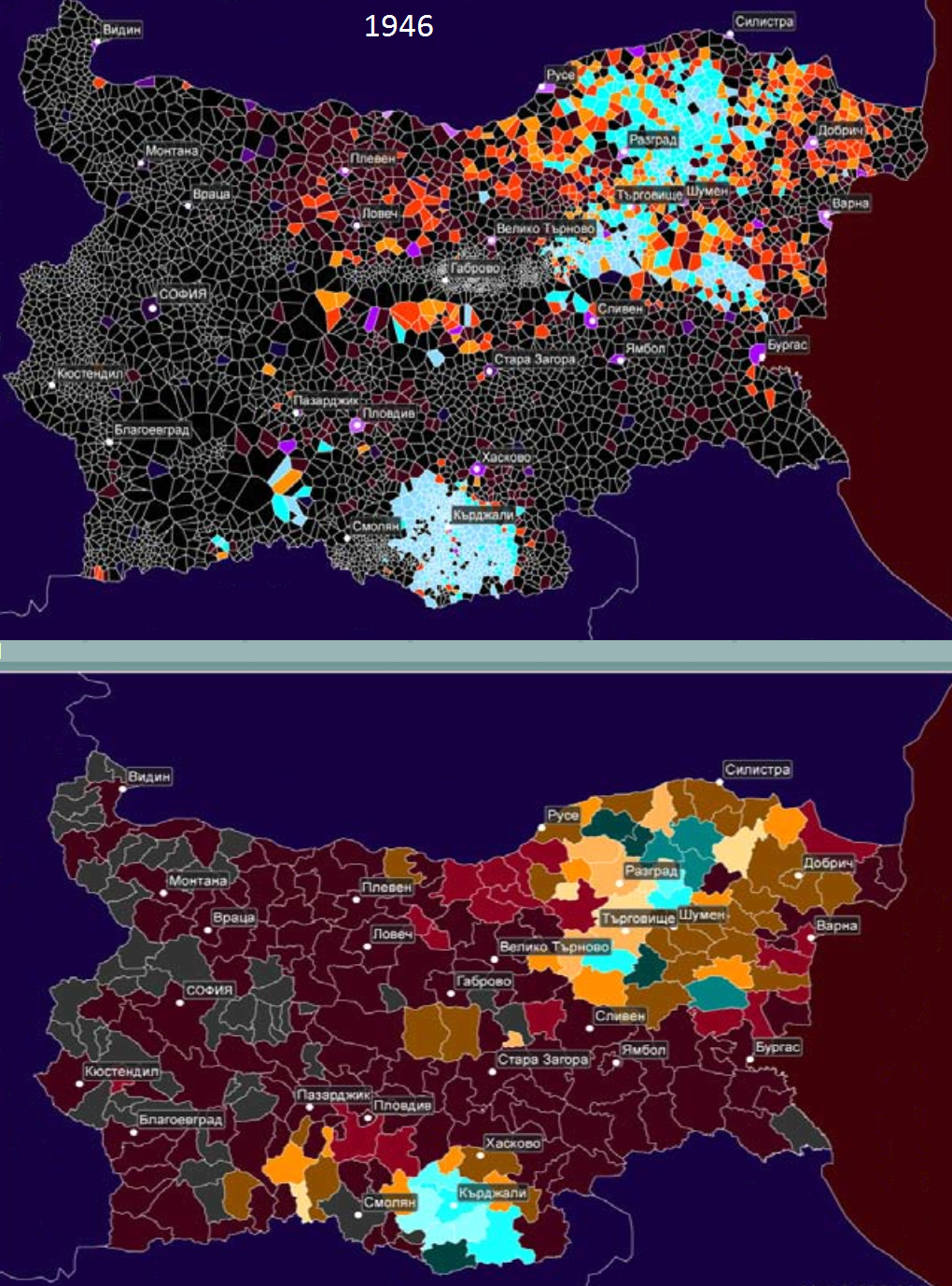
Share of Turks by town halls, compared to the territories of daily municipalities.

Ethnic groups
Ethnic groups	Number	%
Bulgarians	5,903,580	84.0
Turks	675,500	9.6
Romani	170,011	2.4
Macedonians	169,544	2.4
Jews	44,209	0.6
Armenians	21,637	0.3
Russians	13,200	0.2
Total	7,029,349	100

South Dobruja passes on the territory of Bulgaria.

Religion
Religion	Number	%
Orthodox	5,967,992	84.9
Muslim		
Judaism	43,335	0.6
Total	7,029,349	100

== 1 December 1956 census ==
Ethnic groups
Ethnic groups	Number	%
Bulgarians	6.506,541	85.5
Turks	656,025	8.6
Romani	197,865	2.6
Macedonians	187,789	2.5
Armenians	21,954	0.3
Russians	10,551	0.1
Greeks	7,437	0.1
Jews	6,027	0.1
Tatars	5,993	0.1
Romanians	3,749	0.0
Sarakatsani	2,085	0.0
Others	13,199	0.2
Total	7,613,709	100

== 1 December 1965 census ==
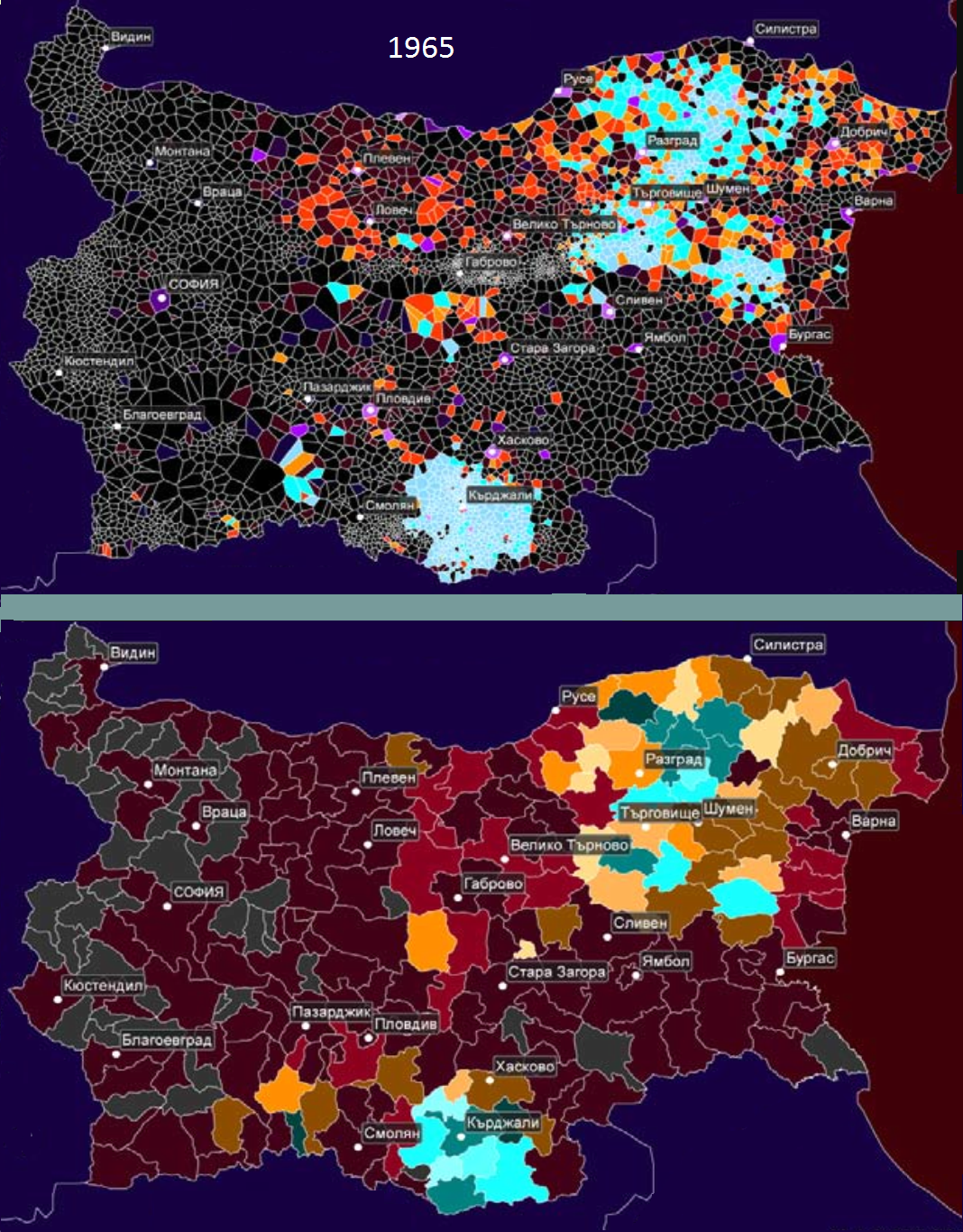
Share of Turks by town halls, compared to the territories of daily municipalities.

Ethnic groups
Ethnic groups	Number	%
Bulgarians	7,231,243	87.9
Turks	780,928	9.5
Romani	148,874	1.8
Armenians	20,282	0.2
Russians	10,815	0.1
Macedonians	9,632	0.1
Greeks	8,241	0.1
Tatars	6,430	0.1
Jews	5,108	0.1
Total	8,227,966	100

== 1 December 1975 census ==
Ethnic groups
Ethnic groups	Number	%
Bulgarians	7,930,024	90.9
Turks	730,728	8.4
Romani	18,323	0.2
Armenians	14,526	0.2
Tatars	5,963	0.1
Jews	3,076	0.0
Total	8,727,771	100

== 4 December 1985 census ==
	Number	%
Total	8,948,649	100

== 4 December 1992 census ==
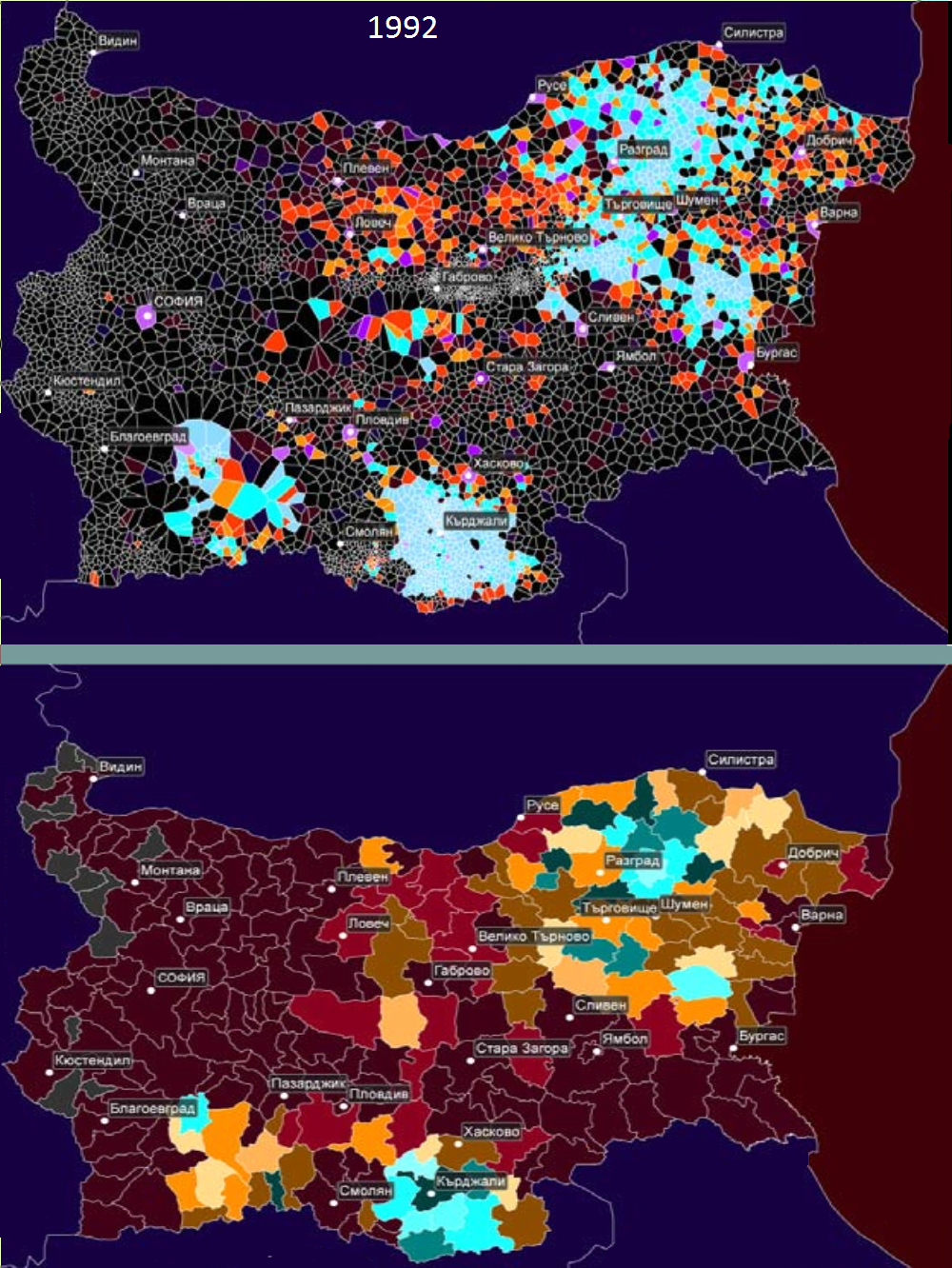
Share of Turks by town halls, compared to the territories of daily municipalities.

Ethnic groups
Ethnic groups	Number	%
Bulgarians	7,271,185	85.7
Turks	800,052	9.4
Romani	313,396	3.7
Russians	17,139	0.2
Armenians	13,677	0.2
Macedonians	10,803	0.1
"Vlachs" (Aromanians, Romanians, Romanian-speaking Boyash)	5,159	0.1
Sarakatsani	5,144	0.1
Greeks	4,930	0.1
Tatars	4,515	0.1
Jews	3,461	0.0
Romanians	2,491	0.0
Ukrainians	1,864	0.0
Gagauzes	1,478	0.0
Others	23,542	0.3
Undeclared	8,481	0.1
Total	8,487,317	100

Religion
Religion	Number	%
Orthodox	7,274,592	85.7
Muslim	1,110,295	13.0
Roman Catholicism	53,074	0.6
Protestant	21,878	0.2
Armenian Grecorian	9.672	0.1
Judaism	2,580	0.0
Other	15,226	0.1
Total	8,487,317	100

== 1 March 2001 census ==
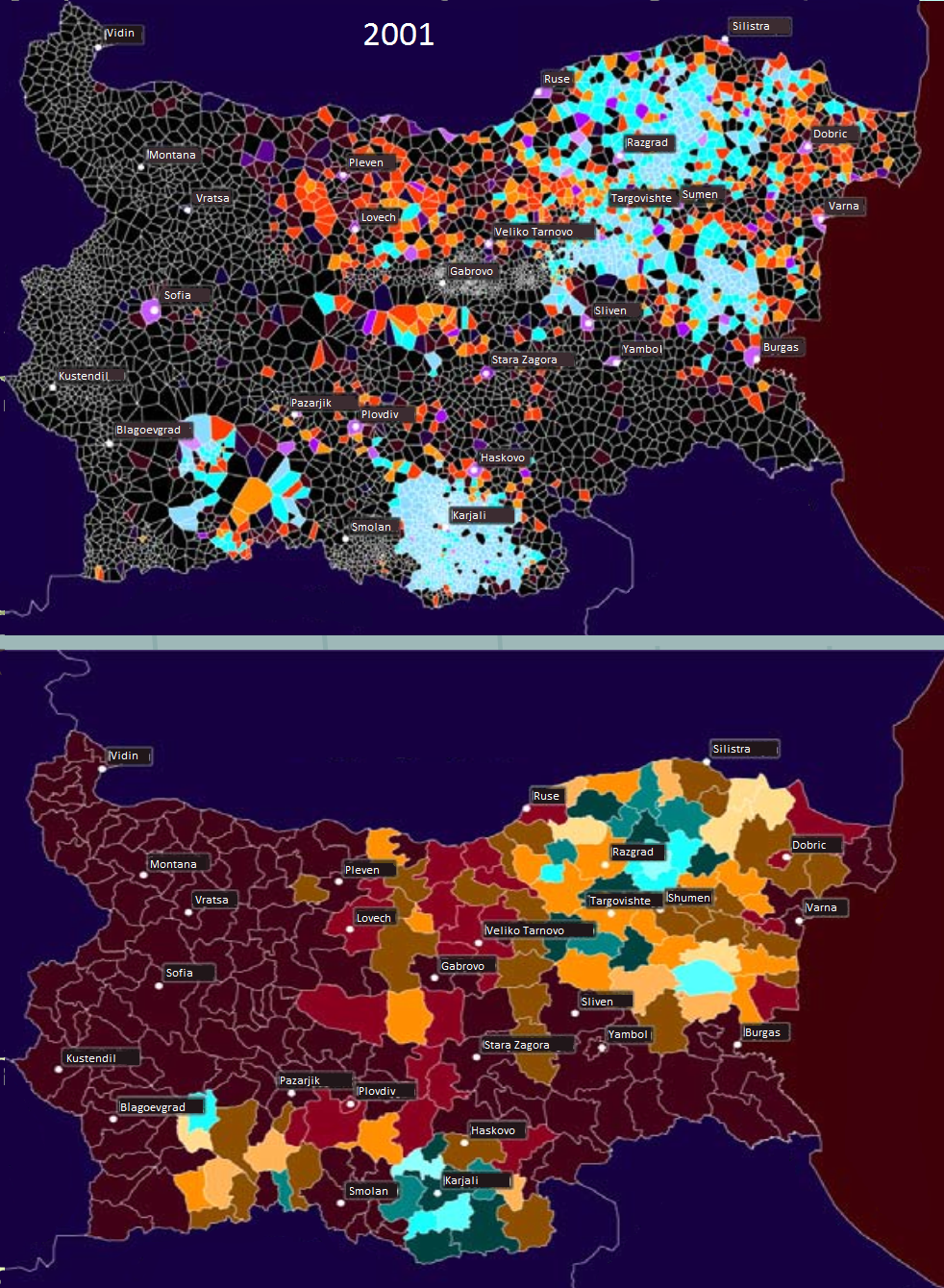
Share of Turks by town halls, compared to the territories of daily municipalities.

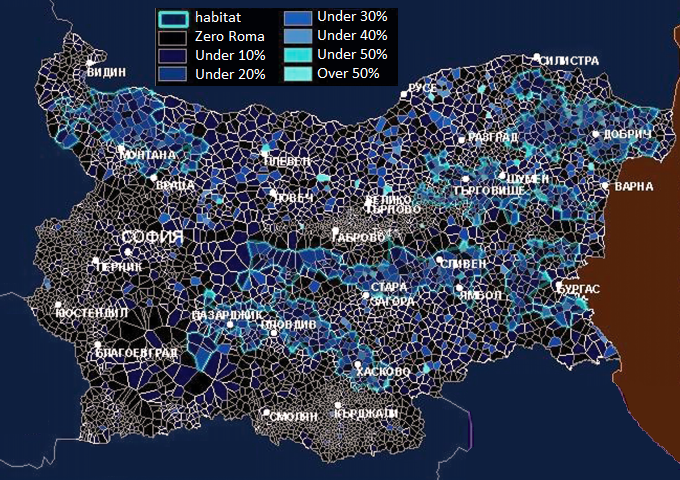
Share of Gypsies on the lands of the settlements.

Ethnic groups
Ethnic groups	Number	%
Bulgarians	6,655,210	83.9
Turks	746,664	9.4
Romani	370,908	4.7
Russians	15,595	0.2
Armenians	10,832	0.1
"Vlachs" (Aromanians, Romanians, Romanian-speaking Boyash)	10,566	0.1
Macedonians	5,071	0.1
Sarakatsani	4,107	0.1
Greeks	3,408	0.0
Ukrainians	2,489	0.0
Tatars	1,803	0.0
Jews	1,363	0.0
Romanians	1,088	0.0
Gagauzes	540	0.0
Others	3,342	0.2
Undeclared	86,915	1.1
Total	7,932,984	100

Religion
Religion	Number	%
Orthodox	6,552,751	82.6
Muslim	966,978	12.1
Roman Catholic	43,811	0.5
Protestant	42,308	0.5
Other	14,937	0.1
Undeclared	308,116	3.9
Total	7,928,901	100

Language
Language	Number	%
Bulgarian	6,697,158	84.6
Turkish	762,516	9.6
Roma	327,882	4.13
Other	71,084	0.9
Undeclared	70,261	0.9
Total	7,928,901	100

== 1 February 2011 census ==
Ethnic map (2011)

Ethnic groups
Ethnic groups	Number	%
Bulgarians	5,664,624	84.8
Turks	588,318	8.8
Romani	325,343	4.9
Russians	9,978	0.1
Armenians	6,552	0.1
"Vlachs" (Aromanians, Romanians, Romanian-speaking Boyash)	3,684	0.1
Sarakatsani	2,556	0.0
Ukrainians	1,789	0.0
Macedonians	1,654	0.0
Greeks	1,379	0.0
Jews	1,162	0.0
Romanians	891	0.0
Others	19,659	0.3
Undeclared	736,981	10.0
Total	7,364,570	100

The 2011 percentage of the ethnic groups is calculated only from those who answered the optional question on ethnicity (6,680,980 in total) and does not include around 750,000 people who did not answer the question or 10% from the population.

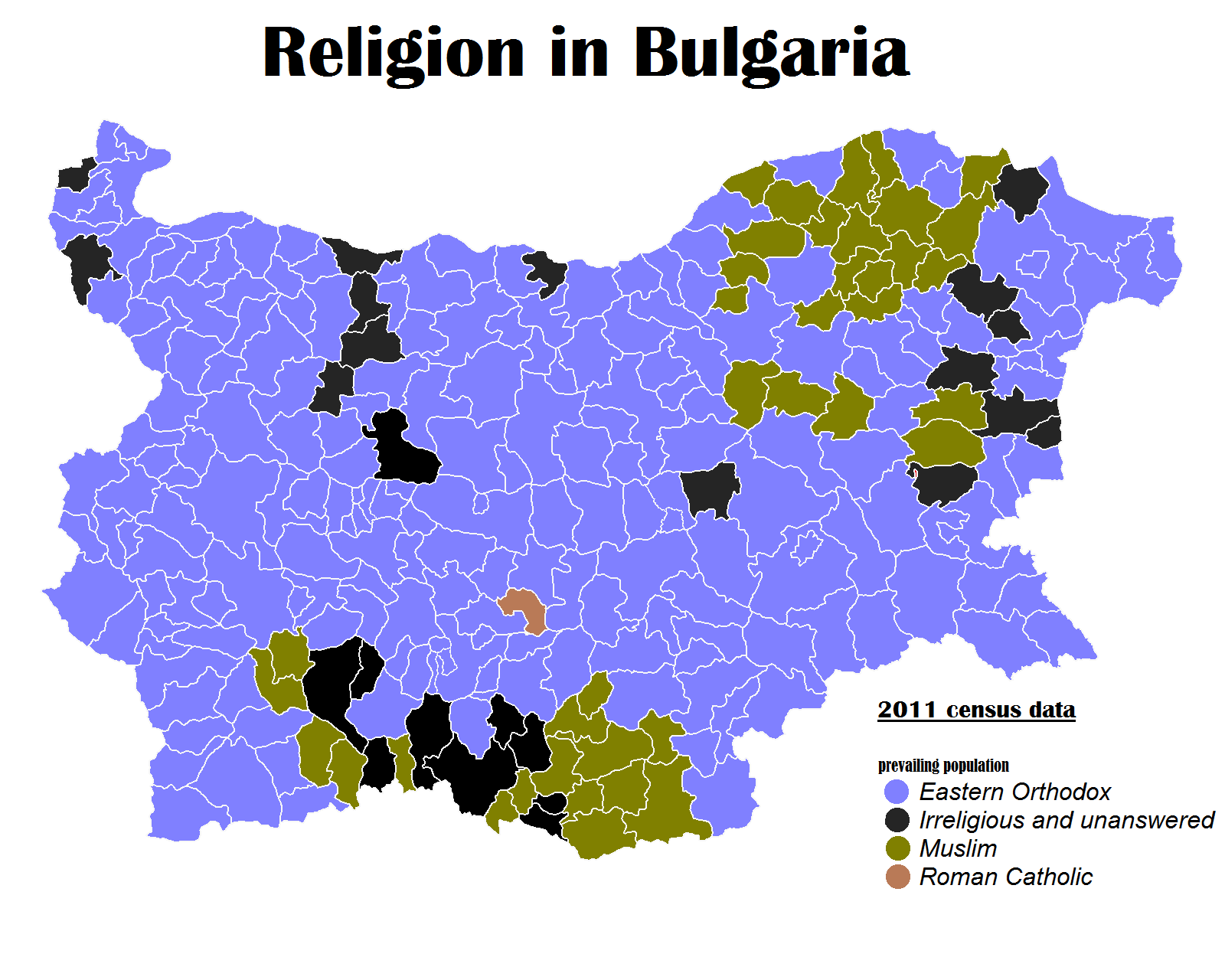
Religion, by municipalities.

Religion
Religion	Number	%
Orthodox	4,374,135	59.3
Muslim	577,139	7.8
Protestant	64,476	0.8
Roman Catholic	48,945	0.6
Others	11,444	0.1
Atheism	272,264	3.6
Undeclared	2,016,167	27.4
Total	7,364,570	100

Language
Language	Number	%
Bulgarian	5,659,024	85.2
Turkish	605,802	9.1
Roma	281,217	4.2
Russians	15,808	0.2
Armenian	5,615	0.0
Romanian	5,523	0.0
Greek	3,224	0.0
"Vlach" (Aromanian and Romanian)	1,826	0.0
Ukrainian	1,755	0.0
Macedonian	1,404	0.0
Arabic	1,397	0.0
Tatar	1,372	0.0
Other	10,623	0.1
Undeclared	47,564	0.7
Total returns	6,642,154	100
Total population	7,364,570	

== 7 September 2021 census ==
Ethnic groups	Number	%
Bulgarians	5,118,494	78.5
Turks	508,378	7.8
Romani	266,720	4.1
Russians	14,218	0.2
Armenians	5,306	0.1
Ukrainians	3,239	0.0
Sarakatsani	2,071	0.0
Vlachs	1,643	0.0
Greeks	1,625	0.0
Jews	1,153	0.0
Macedonians	1,143	0.0
Tatars	1,129	0.0
Romanians	683	0.0
Others	32,210	0.5
Undeclared	547,191	8.4
Total	6,519,789	100

== See also ==
- Demographics of Bulgaria
