= Irreligion in Bulgaria =

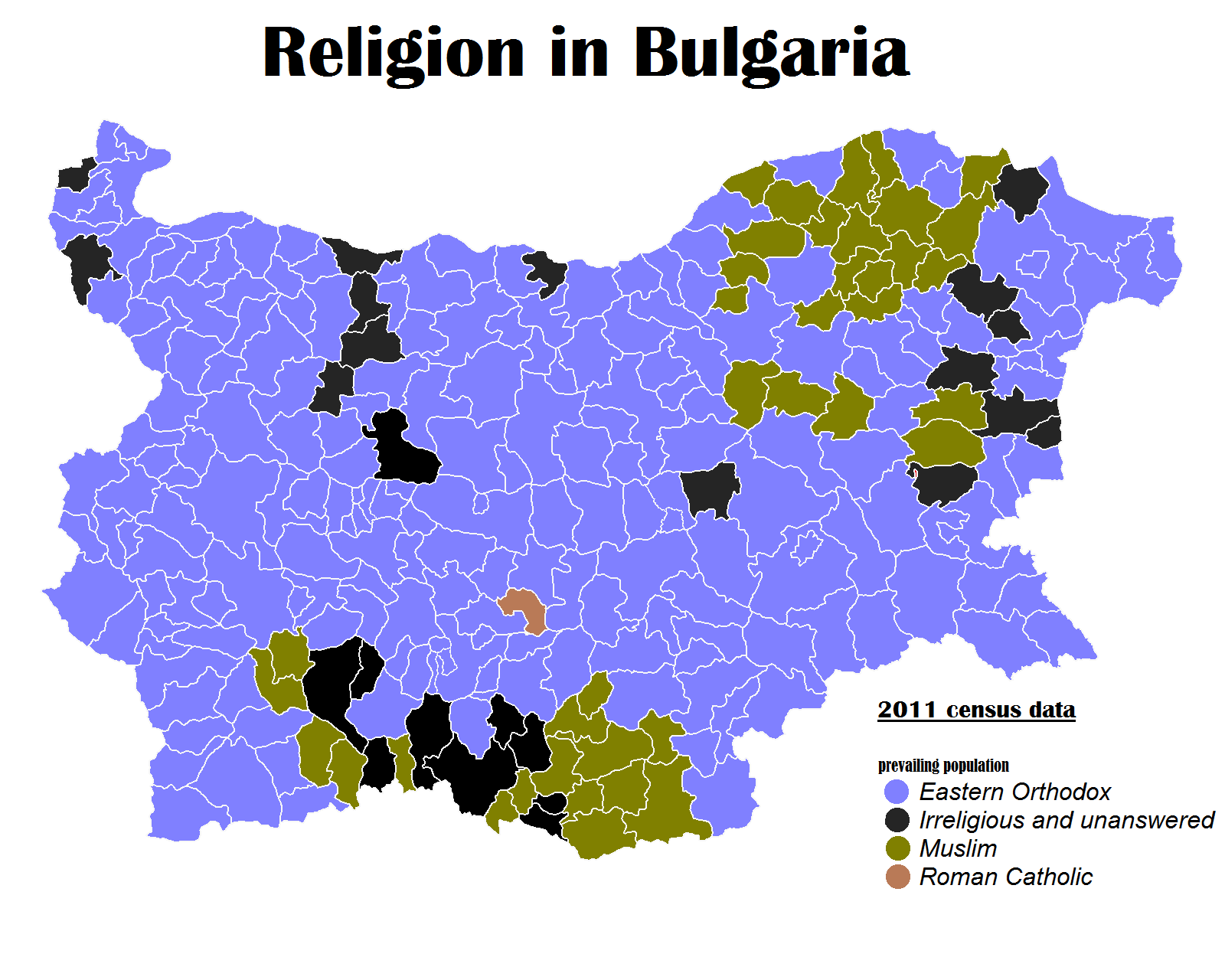
Religion in Bulgaria, 2011 census. Municipalities denoted in black have a plurality of irreligious and unanswered responses.

Religion in Bulgaria (2011 census)
1. Bulgarian Orthodoxy (59.5%)
2. Unaffiliated (9.30%)
3. Islam (7.90%)
4. Protestantism (0.90%)
5. Catholicism (0.70%)
6. Not declared (21.8%)

Irreligion in Bulgaria pertains to atheism, agnosticism, and secularism among the citizens of Bulgaria. Irreligion is a minority religious position in Bulgaria, making up approximately 5-10% of Bulgarians, and irreligion is the second most common religious stance after Eastern Orthodoxy. Irreligion in Bulgaria is closely tied to the history of Marxism–Leninism and Soviet rule in the country during the 20th century.

== History ==
For much of its history, the Bulgarian Orthodox Church was the primary religion of Bulgaria. Early irreligion in Bulgaria rose from the debate over phyletism in the early 20th century, where Bulgarian nationalists disagreed as to the role that religion should play in Bulgarian independence. Bulgarian revolutionaries such as Lyuben Karavelov and Hristo Botev wrote that religion is not necessary to form a cohesive nation. In the 1930s, atheism spread among Bulgarian academics amid translation of Russian atheist works. These academics included Asen Zlatarov, Todor Pavlov, and Azaria Polikarov, who all played a role in the spread of atheism in the country.

In 1946, Bulgaria became the People's Republic of Bulgaria under the government of the Soviet Union. As a soviet republic, state atheism was enforced in the country. The Dimitrov Constitution removed the Orthodox church as the state religion of Bulgaria, and the Denominations Act, 1949 further enforced atheism by placing the church under direct control of the state. The act became a point of contention after Bulgarian independence and was repealed in 2002.

Many religious traditions were secularized during Soviet rule. Religious holidays were renamed, birthdays took precedence over name days, civil marriage became the standard over religious marriage ceremonies, and taxes were prioritized over church dues. Members of the Muslim Bulgarian Turk community were targeted by nationalist propaganda and forced to change their personal names. As a consequence of a scientific tradition in Bulgarian socialism, academics in Bulgaria were relatively free to research and discuss traditional religion in Bulgaria.

Following Bulgaria's independence from the Soviet Union in 1990, the Constitution of Bulgaria recognized Eastern Orthodoxy in Bulgaria while establishing separation of church and state. In the 1990s, religious expression was seen as a rejection of Soviet rule and widely celebrated, and institutions were renamed in honor of religious figures.

== Demographics ==
Irreligion is uncommon in Bulgaria, as most citizens are Eastern Orthodox. In the 2011 Bulgarian census, 9.3% of Bulgarians declared that they were irreligious, a significant increase from 3.88% in 2001. Eurobarometer found the number of irreligious Bulgarians to be 5% in 2019, with an additional 4% undeclared. Irreligion is more common among Romani populations, with 16.1% of Romani Bulgarians not identifying with any religion in the 2001 census, compared to just 2.3% of ethnic Bulgarians at the time.

== See also ==
- Demographics of Bulgaria
- Freedom of religion in Bulgaria
- Religion in Bulgaria
