= Catholic Church in Bulgaria =

Cathedral of St Joseph, Sofia

The Catholic Church is the fourth largest religious congregation in Bulgaria, after Eastern Orthodoxy, Islam and Protestantism. Its roots in the country date to the Middle Ages and are part of the worldwide Catholic Church, under the spiritual leadership of the Pope in Rome.

== Demographics ==
In the country's 2021 census, 0.7% of the population (approximately 39,000 people) stated that they were Catholic. This compared to 53,074 in 1992; 43,811 in 2001; 48,945 in 2011; and 38,709 in 2021.

The vast majority of the Catholics in Bulgaria in 2001 were ethnic Bulgarians and the rest belonged to a number of other ethnic groups such as Croatians, Italians, Arabs and Germans.

Bulgarian Catholics live predominantly in the regions of Svishtov and Plovdiv and are mostly descendants of the heretical Christian sect of the Paulicians, which converted to Catholicism in the 16th and 17th centuries. The largest Catholic Bulgarian town is Rakovski in Plovdiv Province. Ethnic Bulgarian Catholics known as the Banat Bulgarians also inhabit the Central European region of the Banat. Their number is unofficially estimated at 12,000, with 6,500 Banat Bulgarians in the Romanian part of the region.

Bulgarian Catholics are descendants of three groups. The first were converted Paulicians from the course of the Osam river (between Stara Planina and the Danube); those in and around Plovdiv are the second (and largest) group; while the third (and most limited) one is formed by more recent Eastern Orthodox converts.

=== Geographical distribution ===
In 2011, most Catholics lived in the province of Plovdiv (19,502 Catholics), followed by the city of Sofia (5,572 Catholics) and the provinces of Pleven (5,164 Catholics) and Veliko Tarnovo (3,276 Catholics).

Municipality	Catholic population 2011	% of those who answered	% of the total population
Rakovski Municipality	11,400	53.2%	43.2%
Sofia	5,572	0.5%	0.4%
Plovdiv	3,681	1.4%	1.1%
Kaloyanovo Municipality	2,630	23.5%	22.1%
Svishtov Municipality	2,396	7.5%	5.6%
Belene Municipality	1,872	31.9%	18.1%
Levski Municipality	1,504	11.0%	7.5%
Varna Municipality	1,203	0.5%	0.4%
Pleven Municipality	1,173	1.0%	0.9%
Bulgaria as whole	48,945	0.8%	0.7%

== History ==
=== Bulgarian Empire ===
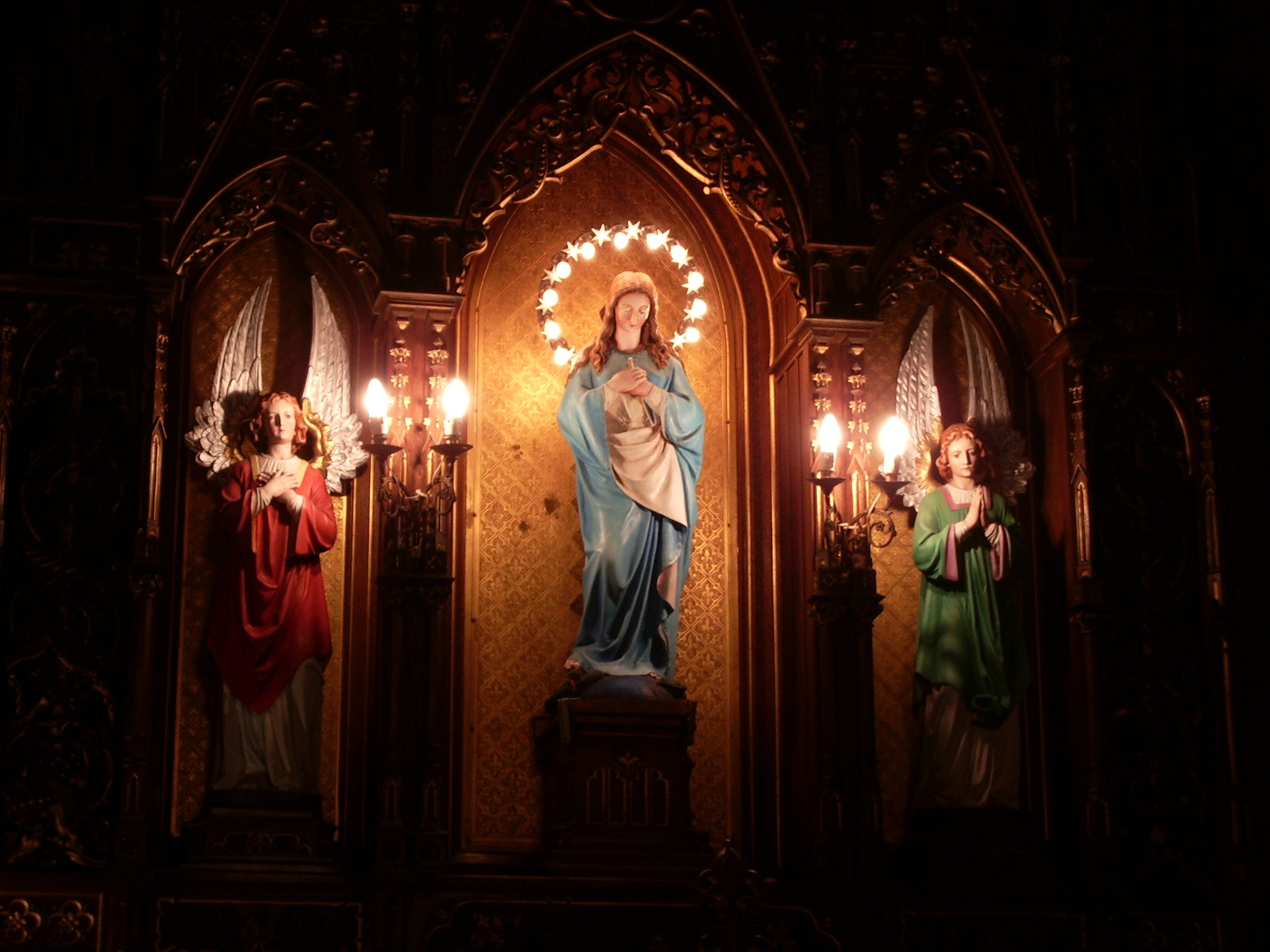
The interior of the St Paul of the Cross Catholic Church in Rousse

Although the presence of Catholicism existed during the reign of Roman Empire in Balkan Peninsula, Catholic missionaries first tried to convert the Bulgarians during the reign of Tsar Boris I in the middle of the 9th century. They were unsuccessful, and Boris I led the Bulgarians in their conversion to Eastern Christianity. In 1204 the Bulgarian Tsar Kaloyan (1197–1207) formed a short-lived union between the Catholic Church and the Bulgarian Orthodox Church as a political tactic to balance the religious power of the Byzantine Empire. The union ended when the Bulgarian Patriarchate was reestablished in 1235 during the council of Lampsacus.

=== Ottoman rule ===
Nonetheless, Catholic missionaries renewed their interest in Bulgaria during the 16th century, after the Council of Trent, when they were aided by merchants from Dubrovnik on the Adriatic. In the next century, Catholic missionaries converted most of the Paulicians, the remainder of a once-numerous heretical Christian sect, to Catholicism. Many believed that conversion would bring aid from Western Europe in liberating Bulgaria from the Ottoman Empire.

By 1700, however, the Ottomans began persecuting Catholics and preventing their Orthodox subjects from converting.

=== Independent Bulgaria ===
After Bulgaria became independent, the Catholic Church again tried to increase its influence by opening schools, colleges, and hospitals throughout the country, and by offering scholarships to students who wished to study abroad. Bulgarian Knyaz Ferdinand of Saxe-Coburg-Gotha was himself Catholic and supported the Vatican in these efforts. The papal nuncio Angelo Roncalli, who later became Pope John XXIII, played a leading role in establishing Catholic institutions in Bulgaria and in establishing diplomatic relations between Bulgaria and the Vatican in 1925.

=== Communist Bulgaria ===
The communist era was a time of great persecution for Catholics, nominally because Catholicism was considered the religion of fascism. Bulgarian communists also deemed Catholicism a foreign influence. Under communist rule, Catholic priests were charged with following Vatican orders to conduct antisocialist activities and help opposition parties. In 1949 foreign priests were forbidden to preach in Bulgaria, and the papal nuncio was forbidden to return to Bulgaria. Relations between the Vatican and Bulgaria were severed at that time. During the "Catholic trials" of 1951-52, sixty priests were convicted of working for Western intelligence agencies and collecting political, economic, and military intelligence for the West; four priests were executed on the basis of these charges. In the early 1950s, the property of Catholic parishes was confiscated, all Catholic schools, colleges, and clubs were closed, and the Catholic Church was deprived of its legal status. Only nominal official toleration of Catholic worship remained.

=== Bulgaria since 1990 ===
Like the practitioners of the other faiths, Catholics in Bulgaria have enjoyed greater religious freedom after the end of communist rule in 1989. Bulgaria reestablished relations with the Vatican in 1990, and the Bulgarian government invited Pope John Paul II to visit Bulgaria. The visit was carried from 23 to 26 May 2002 and was the first visit of a Catholic pope in the country.

In 2022 the Church opened its own radio station. Ave Maria radio was inaugurated with the presence of cardinal Leonardo Sandri, in Sofia.

== Churches and hierarchies ==
=== Latin Church ===
There is no ecclesiastical province for Catholics of the Latin Church (using the Roman Rite), nor suffragans of a neighbouring one, but only two exempt dioceses (i.e. directly subject to the Holy See):

- Diocese of Sofia and Plovdiv, with cathedral see in Plovdiv and co-cathedral in Sofia
- Diocese of Nicopolis, with cathedral see in Rousse.

=== Bulgarian Byzantine Catholic Church ===
Aside from the Latin Church, there is also the sui iuris Bulgarian Greek Catholic Church (for Bulgarian Catholics of the Byzantine Rite), which follows Bulgarian ecclesiastical traditions and uses Bulgarian language, established in 1926 and taking after several organisations created in the late 19th-century, most importantly the Macedonian Apostolic Vicariate of the Bulgarians.

It consists solely of a single eparchy, which was previously an apostolic exarchate and elevated to the rank of an eparchy in 2019. The eparchy is exempt (i.e. immediately subject to the Holy See):

- Bulgarian Greek Catholic Eparchy of Sofia, with its cathedral see in Sofia.

== See also ==
- List of Catholic dioceses (structured view)
- Eastern Orthodoxy in Bulgaria
- Protestantism in Bulgaria
- Religion in Bulgaria
- Freedom of religion in Bulgaria

== Sources and external links ==
- GigaCatholic
- Official website of the Catholic Church in Bulgaria
- Official website of St Paul of the Cross - a Catholic church in Rousse, Bulgaria
