= Eastern Orthodoxy in Bulgaria =

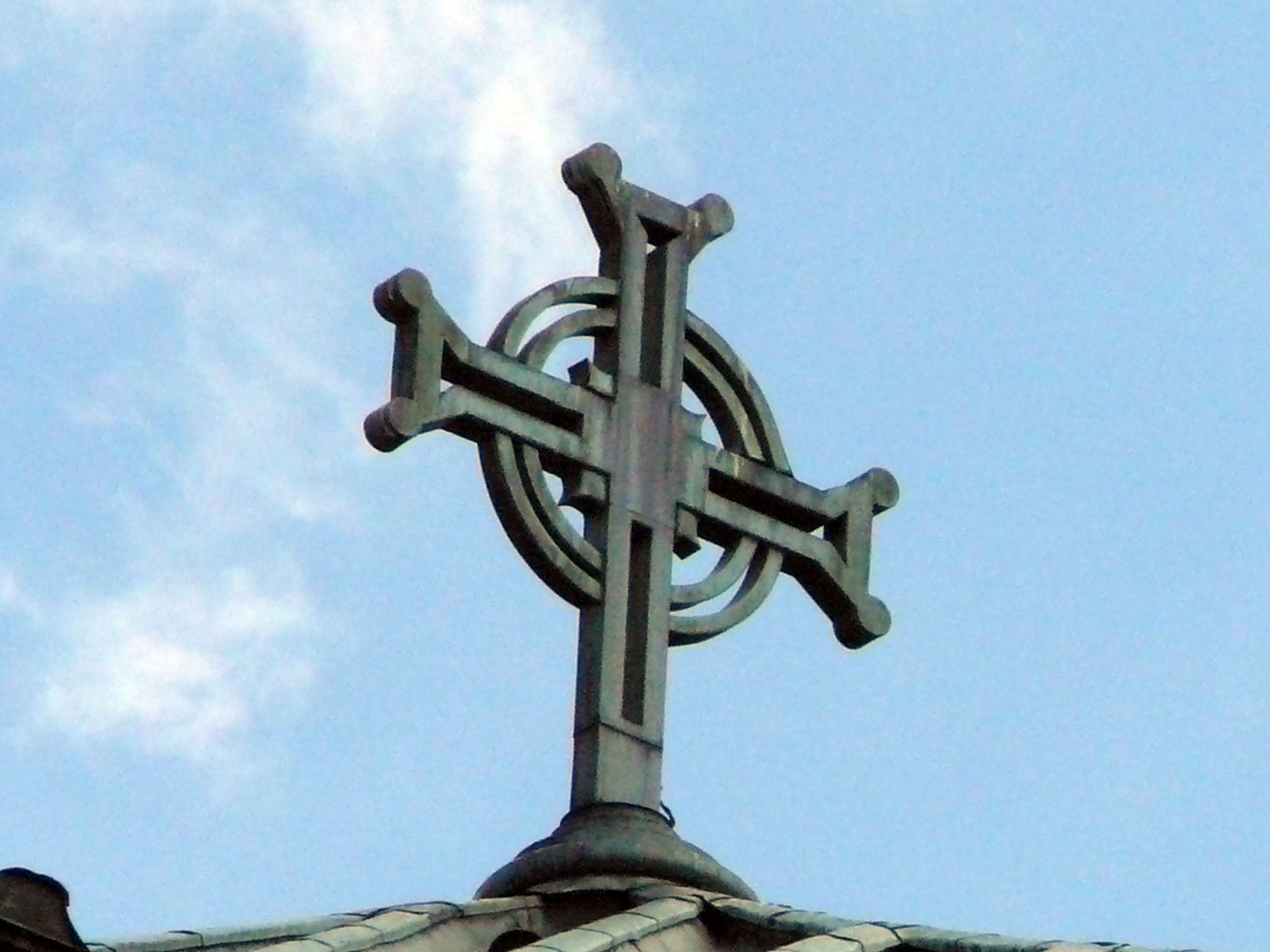
Bulgarian orthodox cross, Sveta Sofia Church

The Eastern Orthodox Church in Bulgaria has deep roots, extending back to the 5th and 7th centuries when the Slavs and the Bulgars, respectively, adopted Byzantine Christianity in the period of the First Bulgarian Empire (681-1018). Prior to this official conversion, Christianity had spread to the region during Roman and early Byzantine times. After the 1054 Great Schism, the Church of Bulgaria remained in communion with the Ecumenical Patriarchate of Constantinople and other Eastern Orthodox Churches. It bears the distinction of being the oldest Slavic Christian Church in the Orthodox communion.

According to the 2001 census, most of Bulgaria's inhabitants (82.6%) were Eastern Orthodox Christians, almost all of whom were members of the Bulgarian Orthodox Church, officially the country's traditional religion. Twenty years later, the 2021 census noted that 62.7% of the population identified as Eastern Orthodox Christian (mainly the BOC).

The Bulgarian Patriarchate has within its jurisdiction 13 dioceses in Bulgaria and another two in Europe and North America.

== See also ==
- Religion in Bulgaria
- Bulgarian Orthodox Church
- Protestantism in Bulgaria
- Roman Catholicism in Bulgaria
