= Protestantism in Bulgaria =

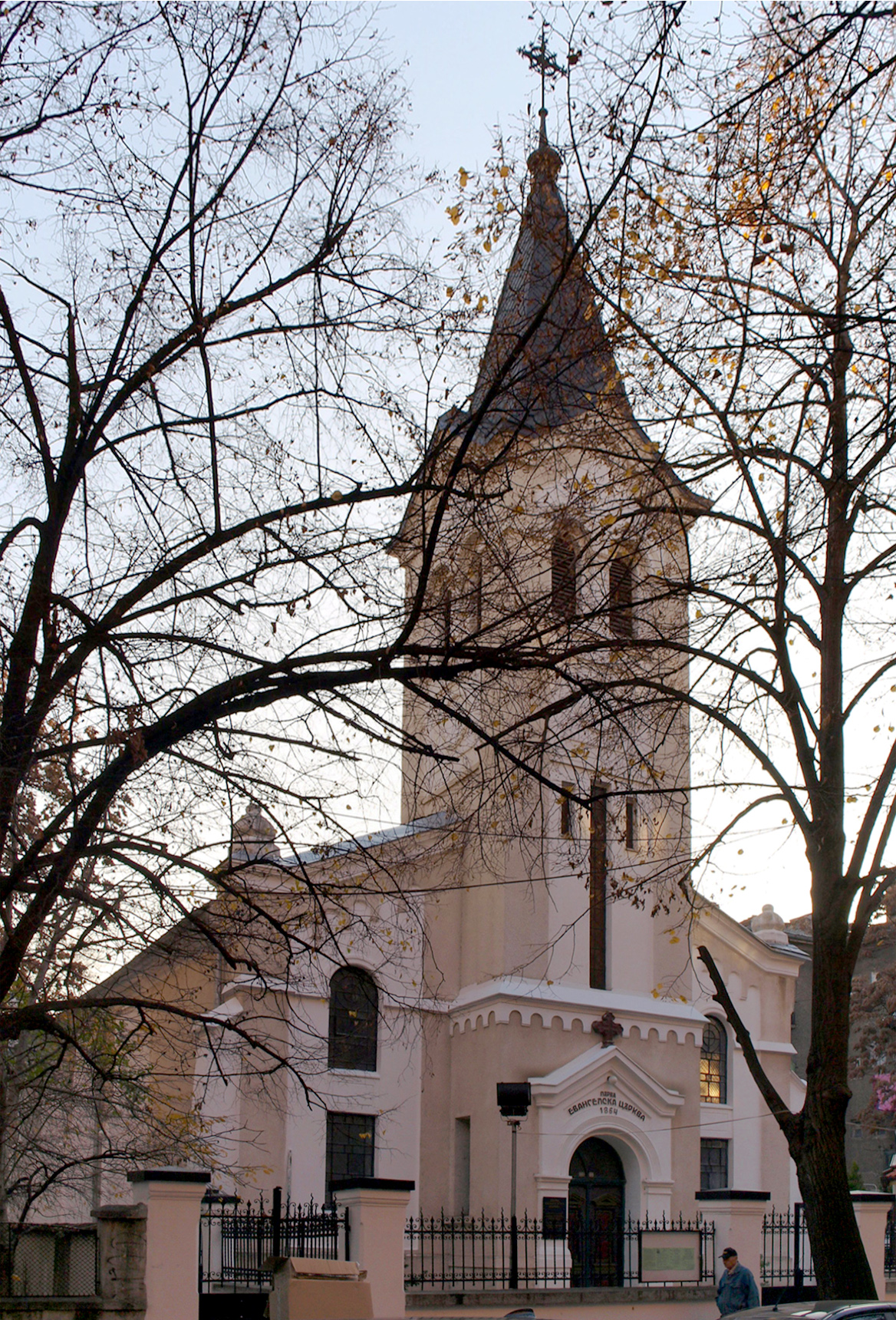
First Evangelical Church in Sofia (established 1864)

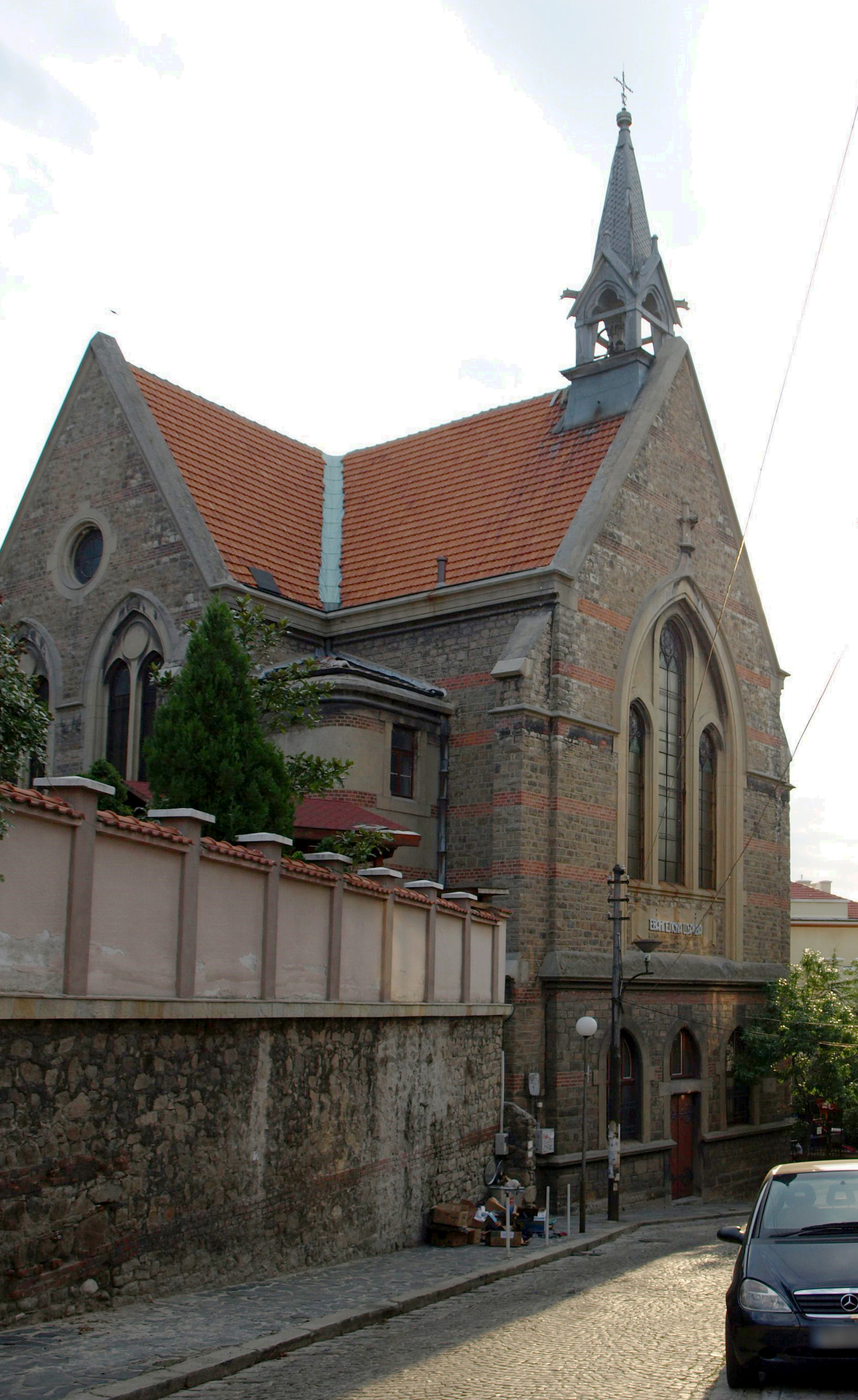
Protestant church in Plovdiv

Protestantism is the third largest religious grouping in Bulgaria after Eastern Orthodoxy and Islam. In the census of 2011, a total of 64,476 people declared themselves to be Protestants of different denominations, up from 42,308 in the previous census in 2001 and from 21,878 in 1992. The marked rise in the number of Protestants in the last two decades is partly due to a boom in conversions among the Bulgarian Roma. In 2001, the two largest ethnic group among the Bulgarian Protestants were the Bulgarians and the Romani with some 25,000 members each.

Protestantism was introduced in Bulgaria by missionaries from the United States in 1857-58, amid the National Revival period. The two main denominations, the Methodists and Congregationalists, divided their areas of influence. The former predominated in northern Bulgaria and the latter in the south. In 1875, the Protestant denominations united in the Bulgarian Evangelical Philanthropic Society, which later became the Union of Evangelical Churches in Bulgaria. Besides setting up churches, the Protestants established schools, clinics, and youth clubs, and they distributed copies of the Bible and their own religious publications in Bulgarian. The Union of Evangelical Churches produced a translation of the entire Bible into contemporary Bulgarian in 1871 and founded the nondenominational Robert College in Constantinople, where many Bulgarian leaders of the post-independence era were educated. After independence in 1878, the Protestants gained influence because they used the vernacular in services and in religious literature.

The 1871 translation of the Bible was based on the work of ABCFM missionary Elias Riggs, Methodist-Episcopalian missionary Albert Long, and Bulgarian intellectuals P.R. Slaveikov and Hristodul Sichan-Nikolov. Translation was not sponsored by the Bulgarian Evangelical Union, but by the British and Foreign Bible Society.

During communist rule, Protestants were subjected to even greater persecution than the Catholics. In 1946 church funding was cut off by a law curbing foreign currency transactions. Because many ministers had been educated in the West before World War II, they were suspected automatically of supporting the opposition parties. In 1949 thirty-one Protestant clergymen were charged with working for American intelligence and running a spy ring in Bulgaria. All church property was confiscated, and the churches' legal status was revoked. Most of the mainstream Protestant denominations maintained the right to worship nominally guaranteed by the constitution of 1947.

Like the practitioners of the other faiths, Protestants in Bulgaria enjoyed greater religious freedom after the fall of the communist leadership in 1989. Due to the work of new, mostly U.S. missionaries, the number of the Protestants in the country almost doubled by 2001 and is soon to overtake the number of the Roman Catholics in the country.

According to estimates in 1991, the 5,000 to 6,000 Bulgarian Pentecostals made that denomination the largest Protestant group. The Pentecostal movement was brought to Bulgaria in 1920 by Russian emigrants to the United States. The movement later spread to Burgas, Yambol, Sliven, Plovdiv and Varna. It gained popularity in Bulgaria after freedom of religion was declared in 1944, and the fall of Zhivkov brought another surge of interest. In 1991 the Pentecostal Church had thirty-six clergy in forty-three parishes, with sufficient concentration in Ruse to petition the government to establish a Bible institute there.

The Union of Evangelical Congregational Churches in Bulgaria is a Congregational church established by American missionaries in the late 19th century.

In 2006 the Advent Christian Church had 7,637 Bulgarian members . The Adventist movement began in the Dobruja region of Bulgaria at the turn of the century and then spread to Tutrakan, Ruse, Sofia, and Plovdiv. It gained momentum in Bulgaria after 1944. During communism, mainstream Adventists maintained the right to worship. Some twenty parishes with forty pastors remained active through that era, although a breakaway reformed group was banned because of its pacifist beliefs. Some Adventists were imprisoned for refusal of military service.

== See also ==
- Religion in Bulgaria
- Orthodoxy in Bulgaria
- Roman Catholicism in Bulgaria
