= Freedom of religion in Bulgaria =

The Bulgarian constitution states that freedom of conscience and choice of religion (or no religion) are inviolable and prohibits religious discrimination; however, the constitution designates Eastern Orthodox Christianity as the "traditional" religion of the country.

== Religious demography ==
The country has an area of 110,990 square kilometres (42,855 sq mi) and a population of almost 7 million. The 2021 census (the most recent) showed that 69.5% of the population identifies itself as Orthodox Christian. Orthodox Christianity, Hanafi Sunni Islam, Judaism, and Catholicism are generally understood as holding a historical place in the country's culture; Muslims comprise the largest minority, estimated at 10.7%; Protestants make up 1.4%, Catholics are 0.7%, while atheists and agnostics make up almost 10% of the country's population.

== Freedom of religion in the 2020s ==
In 2023, the country was scored 3 out of 4 for religious freedom; some local authorities have prohibited proselytizing by minority groups.

Schools are allowed to teach any registered religion as an optional subject; registered groups can also run their own schools.

This article is informed by the US State Department 2010 report on religion freedom. More recent reports are available.

Some religious minorities are concentrated geographically. The Rhodope Mountains (along the country's southern border with Greece) are home to many Muslims, including ethnic Turks, Roma, and "Pomaks" (descendants of Slavic Bulgarians who converted to Islam under Ottoman rule). Ethnic Turkish and Roma Muslims also live in large numbers in the northeast of the country and along the Black Sea coast. More than half of the country's Roman Catholics are located in the region around Plovdiv. The majority of the country's small Jewish community lives in Sofia, Rousse, and along the Black Sea coast. Protestants are more widely dispersed throughout the country. Areas with large Roma populations tend to have some of the highest percentages of Protestants.

According to a 2005 report of the Bulgarian Academy of Sciences, only 50 percent of the six million citizens who identify themselves as Orthodox Christians participate in formal religious services. The same survey found that 90 percent of the country's estimated 70,000 Catholics regularly engage in public worship. Approximately 30 percent of Catholics belong to the Eastern Rite Uniate Church. The majority of Muslims, estimated to number 750,000, are Sunni; 50,000 are classified as Shi'a. The Jewish community is estimated at 3,500 and evangelical Protestants at 50,000. The report also noted that more than 100,000 citizens practice "nontraditional" beliefs. (Orthodox Christianity, Hanafi Sunni Islam, Judaism, and Catholicism are generally understood to be "traditional" faiths.) Forty percent of these "nontraditional" practitioners are estimated to be Roma.

Statistics reported by the Council of Ministers Religious Confessions Directorate reported slightly different figures, listing nearly 1 million Muslims and 150,000 evangelical Protestants, as well as 20,000 to 30,000 Armenian Christians and approximately 3,000 Jews.

== Status of religious freedom ==
=== Legal and policy framework ===
The constitution provides for freedom of religion, and other laws and policies have contributed to the generally free practice of religion. The government generally enforces these provisions, and citizens have the right to sue the government for violations of religious freedom.

The 2002 Denominations Act allows private religious exercise if members of the religious community are the only persons present, and public religious exercise if the exercise is also open to persons not belonging to the respective religious community.

The constitution stipulates that Eastern Orthodox Christianity, represented by the Bulgarian Orthodox Church (BOC), is the traditional religion. The 2002 Denominations Act designates the Metropolitan of Sofia as the BOC's patriarch and establishes the BOC as a legal entity, exempting it from court registration mandatory for all other religious groups that wish to acquire national legal recognition. The state budget allocated $1.8 million (three million leva) for registered religious groups. Of the total amount, $1.4 million (2.3 million leva) was allocated for the BOC, $113,000 (180,000 leva) for the Muslim community, $25,000 (40,000 leva) for the Armenian Apostolic Church, $18,000 (30,000 leva) for the Jewish community, and $25,000 (40,000 leva) for other registered denominations.

To receive national legal recognition, denominations applied for official court registration, which was generally granted. The Council of Ministers' Religious Confessions Directorate, formerly responsible for the registration of religious groups, provides "expert opinions" on registration matters upon request of the court. All applicants have the right to appeal negative registration decisions to the court of appeals. The 2002 Denominations Act does not require local formal registration of denominations, although in the past some local authorities insisted that branches register locally. Some concerns remained that the act does not adequately specify the consequences of failure to register.

The government observes the following religious holidays as national holidays: Orthodox Christmas, Good Friday, and Easter. In addition, the government respects the holidays of non-Orthodox religious groups, such as Muslim, Catholic, Jewish, evangelicals, and Baha'i, and grants their members nonworking days.

The constitution prohibits the formation of political parties along religious lines, but there were concerns that some parties exploited religious problems for political purposes.

The law allows the publication of religious media and the distribution of religious literature. However, some municipal ordinances require local permits for literature distribution in public places.

Public schools offer an optional religious education course that covers Christianity and Islam. The course examines the historical, philosophical, and cultural aspects of religion and introduces students to the moral values of different religious groups. All officially registered religious groups can request that their religious beliefs be included in the course's curriculum.

The government does not permit religious headdresses on official photos for national identity documents.

=== Restrictions on religious freedom ===
The government generally respected religious freedom in practice; however, it did not apply existing laws on religious issues consistently.

A longstanding dispute over the leadership of the Muslim community continued during the reporting period. A 2008 Muslim conference elected Mustafa Alish Hadji as chief mufti. Rival Islamic leader Nedim Gendzhev appealed the 2008 conference alleging that Hadji had forged the denominations' bylaws to convene it. In August 2009 the Sofia appellate court ruled in Gendzhev's favor and annulled the results of the 2008 conference. On May 12, 2010, the Supreme Court of Cassation rejected an appeal filed by Hadji, thus confirming the 2009 decision that annulled his registration as chief mufti. The May Supreme Court decision reinstated Gendzhev, who holds the latest valid legal registration dating back to 1996. The court previously annulled the Muslim conferences held in 1997, 2000, and 2005. In October 2009 another Muslim conference reelected Hadji as chief mufti. The court decision on Hadji 's request to register the 2009 conference was suspended, awaiting the Supreme Court decision, and was pending at the end of the reporting period. Hadji and his supporters staged protests against Gendzhev, who they claim stole $500,000 (800,000 leva) when the court temporarily reinstated him to the Chief Mufti 's Office in 2006.

During the reporting period, the Jewish Center Chabad Lubavitch filed a new application for court registration, which was pending. The court rejected its earlier request in January 2009 holding that the group had violated article 27 of the Denominations Act by operating a synagogue and a kindergarten without the consent of the registered Jewish religious organization and thus in violation of the law. Article 27 requires all nonprofit legal entities seeking to promote an already registered denomination to receive the consent of that denomination.

Some "nontraditional" groups continued to face discrimination and prejudice from local authorities in certain localities, despite obtaining a national registration with the Sofia City Court. Article 19 of the 2002 Denominations Act states that nationally registered religious groups may have local branches. The law requires notification, although some municipalities claimed that it requires formal local registration. On November 3, 2009, police officers disrupted a gathering of Jehovah's Witnesses in Sandanski and requested proof of local registration by the municipality.

Some municipal regulations restricted certain forms of proselytizing and prohibited the distribution of religious literature by groups that were not locally registered. There were continuing reports of enforcement of these rules in Burgas, Gabrovo, Dobrich, Haskovo, Varna, Plovdiv, and Pleven. Jehovah's Witnesses voiced concerns over an increasing number of instances in which police officers or municipal guards stopped and fined missionaries for engaging persons in religious conversations. On April 24, 2010, police fined a member of Jehovah's Witnesses in Dobrich for organizing a public religious meeting without a permit. On March 30, 2010, police officers issued a warning to three Jehovah's Witnesses in Plovdiv prohibiting them from preaching from house to house. On March 16, 2010, police fined a member of Jehovah's Witnesses in Varna for distributing propaganda materials without a municipal permit.

Both Jehovah's Witnesses and the Muslim community continued to report problems with obtaining construction permits for new prayer houses and mosques. The construction of a mosque in Burgas was still suspended at the end of the reporting period from March 2009, when the local authorities required a separate permit for the mosque's minaret. On December 4, 2009, the administrative court in Varna annulled a 2001 change in the zoning plan, which allowed the construction of a religious building, thus invalidating the Jehovah's Witnesses' 2005 construction permit. The Jehovah's Witnesses' appeal of the decision before the Supreme Administrative Court was pending at the end of the reporting period. Also pending was their request for the reissuing of a construction permit for a prayer house in Gabrovo. Local authorities halted the construction of the prayer house in February 2009, claiming that the Jehovah's Witnesses had illegally erected a concrete fence at the site. Jehovah's Witnesses demolished the fence in March 2009 and paid the fine, but their request to resume construction remained unanswered at the end of the reporting period.

There were no indications that the government discriminated against members of any religious group in restitution of nationalized properties from the communist period. However, the BOC, the Catholic Church, the Muslim and Jewish communities, and several Protestant denominations complained that some of their confiscated properties had not been returned.

Despite a decade-old court decision in its favor, the Jewish community was unable to regain possession of a state-run hospital in central Sofia until May 2009, when the Ministry of Health made the premises available and the hospital was relocated to another building. Prior to the relocation, the hospital's management contested in court the Jewish community's ownership over the building. On March 5, 2009, the court terminated the case based on a letter from the Health Ministry confirming the relocation, but the hospital management's appeal of the court decision was pending at the end of the reporting period. This paved the way for the Jewish community to take physical possession of the building, although its ownership remained contested. The pending court case made it difficult for them to profitably use this property.

=== Abuses of religious freedom ===
The resolution of a case concerning the Alternative Orthodox Synod and the 2004 forceful expulsion of its members from their parishes remained pending at the end of the reporting period. In January 2009 the European Court of Human Rights (ECHR) ruled that the government had violated the religious rights of the Alternative Synod members and advised the parties to negotiate a mutually agreeable compensation for damages. The government appealed the ruling, since the BOC leadership refused to negotiate with the claimants who were called to apologize for what the BOC viewed as illegal occupation of church property and false representation of the denomination. On June 5, 2009, the ECHR Grand Chamber rejected the government's appeal and left the compensation issue at the decision of the court, which was pending at the end of the reporting period.

There were no reports of religious prisoners or detainees in the country.

There were no reports of forced religious conversion.

=== Antisemitism ===
Dimitar Stoyanov, a member of the extremist political party Ataka and a new Member of the European Parliament as of January 1, 2007, stated that he opposed the "Jewish establishment" and was quoted saying, "There are a lot of powerful Jews, with a lot of money, who are paying the media to form the social awareness of the people. They are also playing with economic crises in countries like Bulgaria and getting rich."

== Societal abuses and discrimination ==
There were increasing reports of societal abuses or discrimination based on religious affiliation, belief, or practice.

Relations between religious groups generally remained civil and tolerant; however, discrimination, harassment, and public intolerance of some religious groups remained an intermittent problem. There were continuing reports of societal discrimination against "nontraditional" religious groups as well as negative and derogatory media stories about such groups. Jehovah's Witnesses continued to report numerous print and broadcast media stories with negative, derogatory, and sometimes slanderous information about their activities and beliefs. The Church of Jesus Christ of Latter-day Saints voiced concerns over the media's reluctance to cover their charity work and positive contributions to the society. Although less common than in previous years, some Protestant groups continued to report hostility and verbal attacks from the local population in heavily Muslim areas.

The Jewish community reported an increased number of antisemitic incidents. In one incident, a memorial to Russian soldiers was painted with swastikas both on the eve of May 9, 2010, and on the 65th anniversary of the end of the Holocaust. Other incidents include the desecration of the walls of Jewish schools in Sofia on March 21, 2010, as well as two instances of vandalism in Burgas on July 13, 2009, where vandals threw several molotov cocktails at the synagogue and the local Jewish community center.

The Muslim community continued to report numerous cases of mosque desecration. On April 21, 2010, the walls of the mosque in Blagoevgrad were painted with swastikas after its windows were broken several days earlier. The same mosque was set on fire on October 5, 2009, and was renovated with financial support from the government. The mosque in Karlovo was set on fire on April 17, 2010, and the mosque in Nikopol burned to the ground on October 7, 2009. On April 4, 2010, six youths desecrated the mosque in Varna. The mosque in Kazanlak had its windows broken on November 3, 2009, and the mosque in Haskovo on July 12, 2009. Three mosques in Plovdiv were painted with swastikas in November and December 2009. There were no reports of prosecutions in these incidents. In May 2010 the Ministry of Interior promised the community a detailed report on all anti-Muslim incidents in the last three years and guidelines for better cooperation between the police and the community at the local level.

Jehovah's Witnesses complained of persistent intolerance from the nationalistic Internal Macedonian Revolutionary Organization (VMRO) political party and in particular its branches in Varna, Vratsa, Rousse, and Dobrich, where VMRO supporters staged protests against Jehovah's Witnesses' memorial celebrations and gatherings.

== See also ==
- Religion in Bulgaria
- Human rights in Bulgaria
