= Religion in Bulgaria =

Religion in Bulgaria (2021 census)
1. Eastern Orthodoxy (62.7%)
2. Protestantism (1.10%)
3. Catholicism (0.60%)
4. Islam (9.80%)
5. Other religions (0.40%)
6. Irreligion (4.70%)
7. Unaffiliated (11.2%)
8. Data borrowed from administrative sources (9.50%)

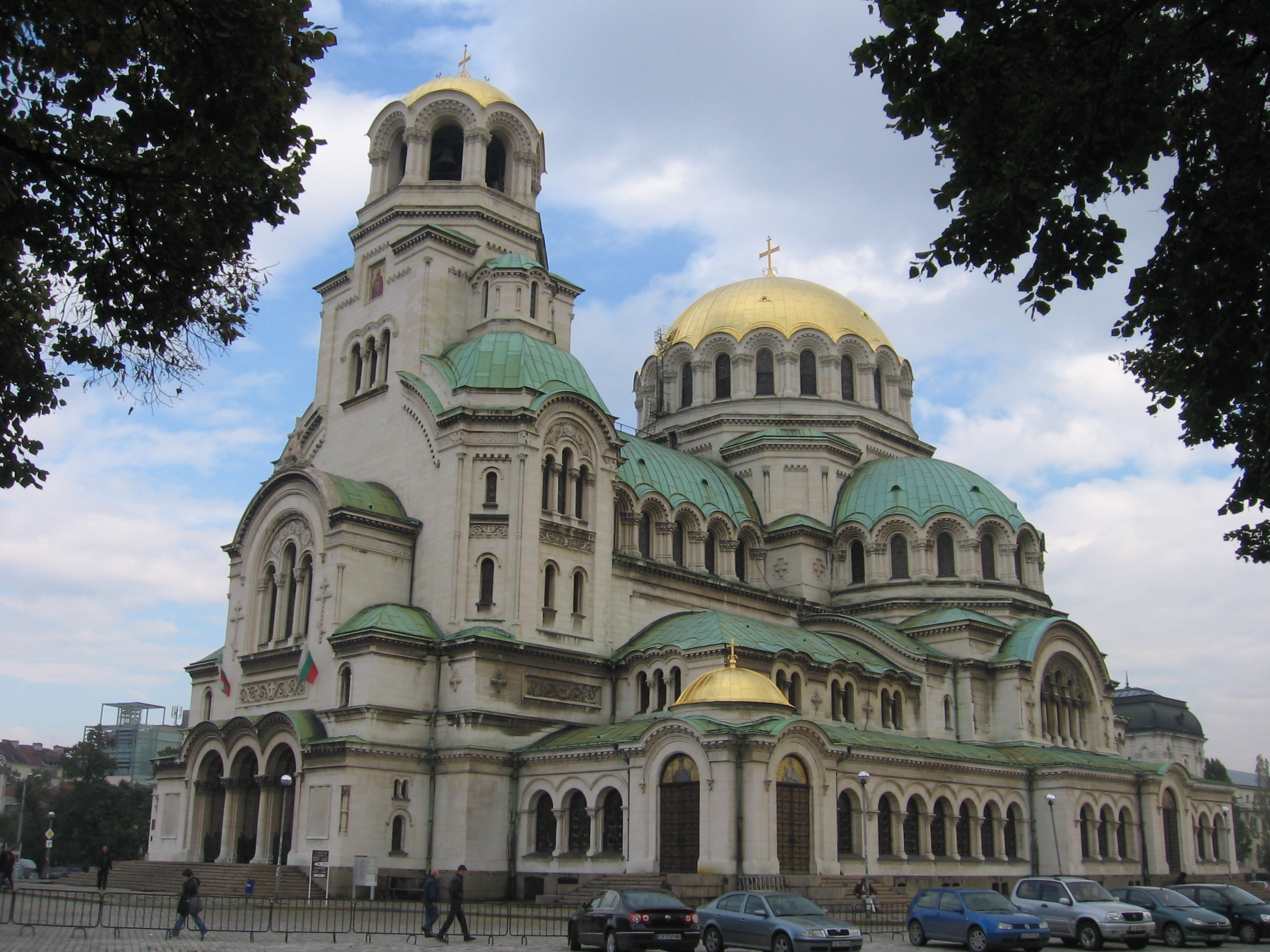
The Alexander Nevsky Cathedral in Sofia is among the largest Eastern Orthodox churches in the world and the cathedral church of the Patriarch of Bulgaria.

Religion in Bulgaria has been dominated by Christianity since its adoption as the state religion in 864. The dominant form of the religion is Eastern Orthodox Christianity within the fold of the Bulgarian Orthodox Church. During the Ottoman rule of the Balkans, Islam spread to the territories of Bulgaria, and it remains a significant minority today. The Catholic Church has roots in the country since the Middle Ages, and Protestantism arrived in the 19th century; both of them remain very small minorities. Today, a significant part of the Bulgarians are not religious, or believers who do not identify with any specific religion, and Bulgaria has been the cradle of some new religions, notably the Neo-Theosophical movement of Dunovism.

Since the early 21st century, there has been a decline of both historic religions of Bulgaria—Eastern Orthodox Christianity and Islam. Orthodox Christianity has shrunk from 7.3m or 87% of the population in the 1992 census to 4.4m or 60% in 2011 and 4.1m or 63% in 2021, and Islam from 1.1m or 13% in 1992 to 0.6m or 10% in 2021. Over the same timespan, Protestantism and other non-Eastern Orthodox and non-Catholic Christianities have grown from about twenty thousand or 0.3% of the population in 1992 to about eighty thousand or 1.3% in 2021, while unaffiliated people, comprising both not religious people and people who have some belief but not identifiable with any specific religion, have grown from 0.3m or 4% in 2001 to 1m or 16% in 2021. Until the 1992 census, Bulgarians were obliged to declare the historic religious belonging of their parents and/or ancestors, while since 2001 people were allowed to declare personal affiliation or unaffiliation to any religion. Moreover, beginning with the 2011 census, Bulgarians were allowed to avoid giving any answer to the question about religion; 22% of the population in 2011 and 9.5% in 2021 did not answer.

After the end of the socialist and one-party People's Republic of Bulgaria (1946–1990) and the transition of the country to a parliamentary republic, the revival of Islam was stronger than that of Eastern Orthodox Christianity, and the Bulgarian Orthodox Church has witnessed a serious decline in its membership from 2001 onwards. The authority of the Bulgarian Orthodox Church was undermined since the 1990s because of its collaboration with the erstwhile socialist regime, which was fully revealed with the opening of the state's secret archives in 2012, according to which eighty percent of the clergy were former members of the secret police. Article 13 of the Constitution of Bulgaria designates Eastern Orthodox Christianity as the traditional religion of the country, but guarantees the free exercise of any religion, that religion is separate from the state, and that it shall not be used for political aims; Article 37 affirms that the freedom of choice of different religious or irreligious views is inviolable, and the state shall safeguard the harmony between them. Unlike former Yugoslavia in the 1990s, Bulgaria has not experienced any significant ethnic or religious strife, and the religious communities of the country coexist peacefully. In fact, the capital Sofia is known for its so-called "Square of Religious Tolerance", where the Church of Saint Nedelya, the Cathedral of Saint Joseph, the Banya Bashi Mosque and the Sofia Synagogue are located within close proximity to each other in the very centre of the city.

== Demographics ==
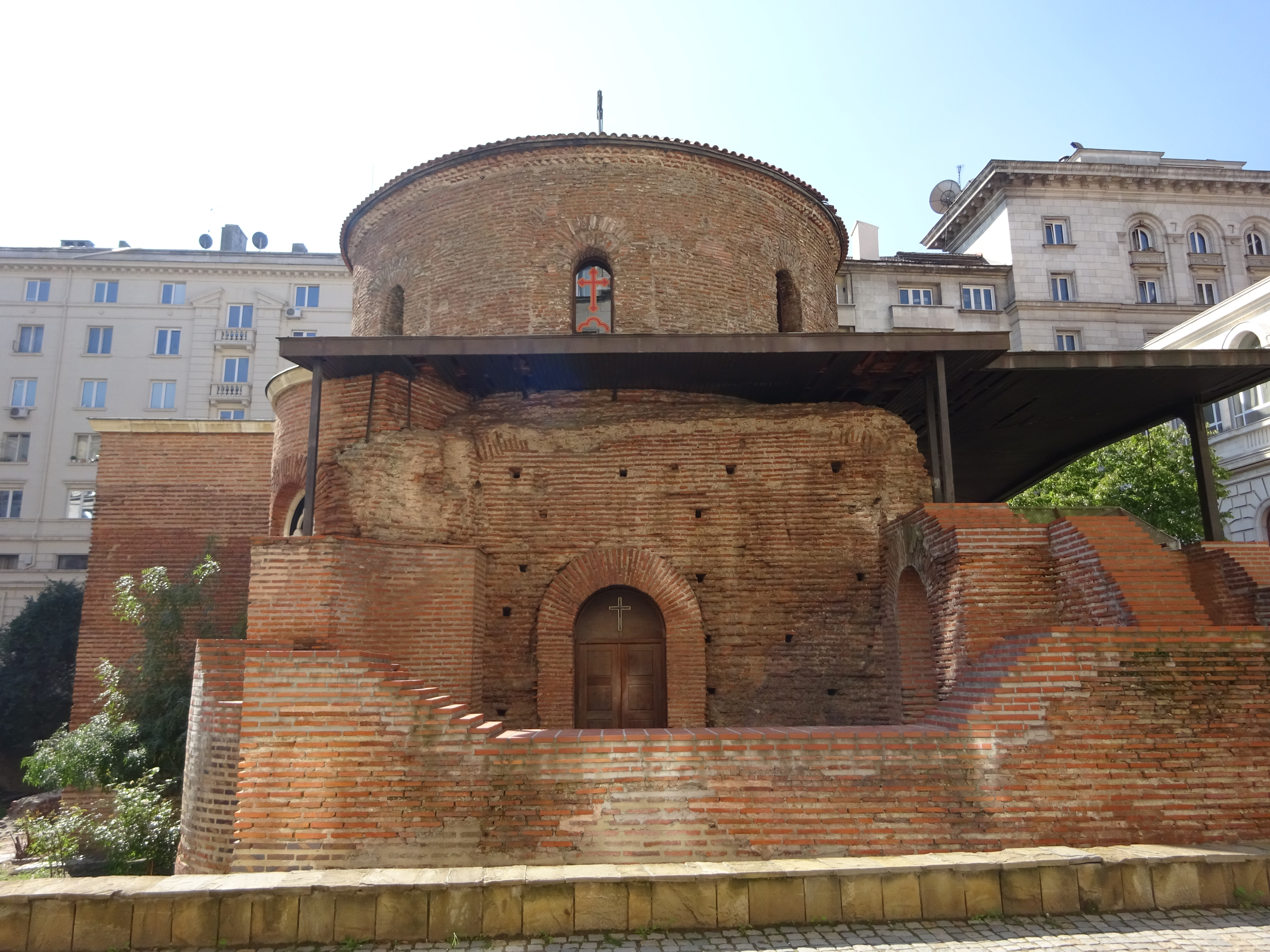
The Church of Saint George in Sofia is the oldest church in Bulgaria.

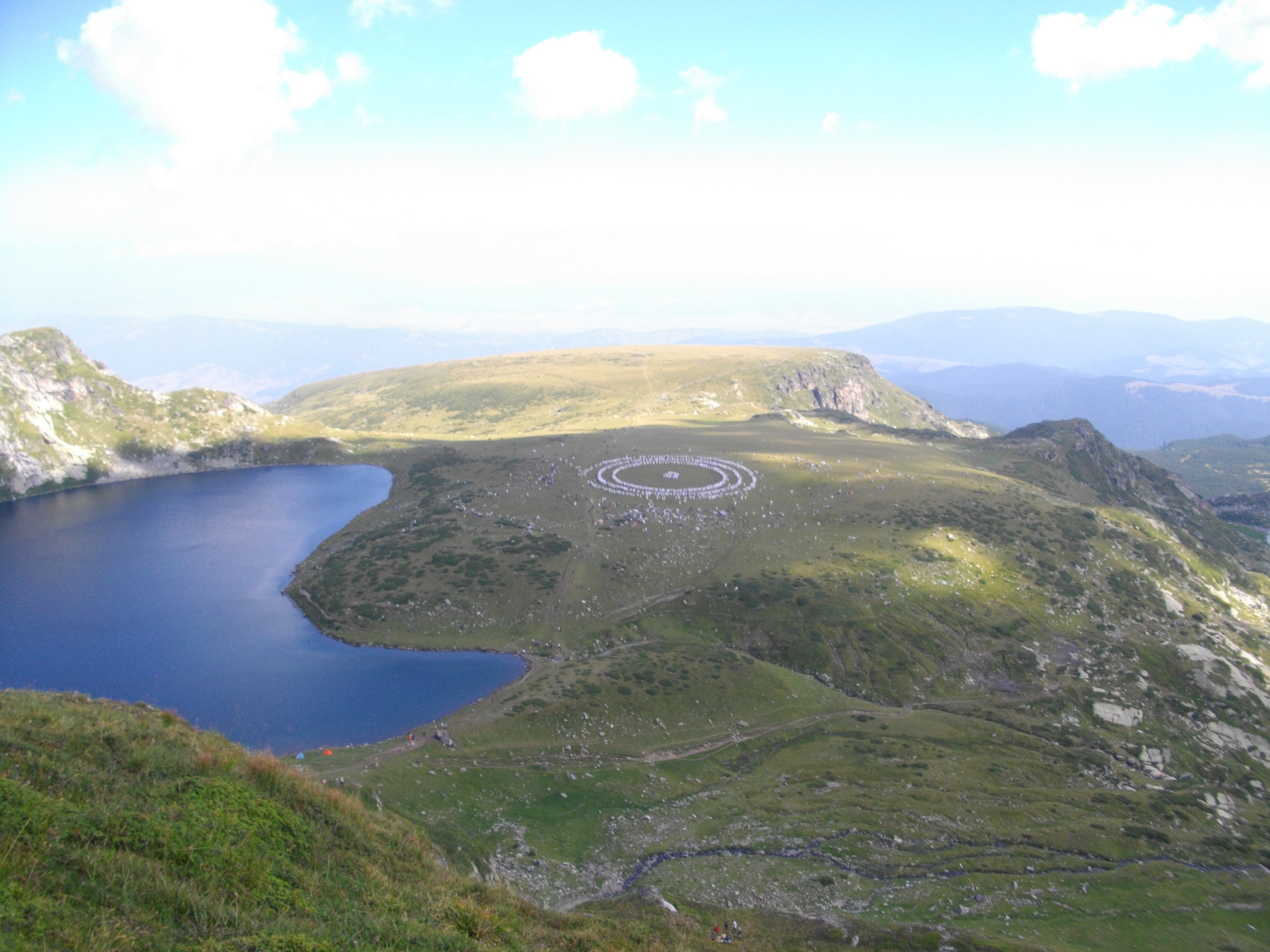
Members of the Universal White Brotherhood, a Hermetic/Theosophical religious organisation founded in Bulgaria itself, practising paneurhythmy at the Seven Rila Lakes.

=== Census statistics, 1887–2021 ===
Religious affiliations in Bulgaria, census 1887–2021
Religion	1887		1905		1926		1946		1992		2001		2011		2021	
Religion	Number	%	Number	%	Number	%	Number	%	Number	%	Number	%	Number	%	Number	%
Christianity	2,450,073	77.7	3,392,140	84.1	4,641,257	84.7	5,967,992+	84.9+	7,350,016	86.6	6,638,870	83.7	4,487,554	60.9	4,219,270	64.7
—Bulgarian Orthodox	2,424,371	76.9	3,344,790	82.9	4,568,773	83.4	5,967,992	84.9	7,274,479	85.7	6,552,751	82.6	4,374,135	59.4	4,091,780	62.7
—Protestant	1,358	0.04	5,644	0.1	6,735	0.1	–	–	22,067	0,3	42,308	0.5	64,476	0.9	69,852	1.1
—Roman Catholic	18,505	0.6	29,084	0.7	40,347	0.7	–	–	53,470	0.6	43,811	0.6	48,945	0.7	38,709	0.6
—Armenian Apostolic	5,839	0.2	12,622	0.3	25,402	0.5	–	–	9,672	0.1	6,500	0.1	1,715	0.02	5,002	0.1
—Other Christians*	–	–	–	–	–	–	–	–	–	–	–	–	–	–	13,927	0.2
Islam	676,215	21.4	603,867	15.0	789,269	14.4	938,418	13.3	1,111,838	13.1	966,978	12.2	577,139	7.8	638,708	9.8
Judaism	24,352	0.8	37,656	0.9	46,431	0.8	43,335	0.6	2,580	0.03	653	0.01	706	0.01	1,736	0.03
Other religions*	–	–	–	–	–	–	–	–	9,302	0.1	14,284	0.2	9,023	0.1	6,451	0.1
Unaffiliated**	–	–	–	–	–	–	–	–	–	–	308,116	3.9	682,162	9.3	1,036,943	15.9
Not answered***	–	–	–	–	–	–	–	–	–	–	–	–	1,606,269	21.8	616,681	9.5
Total population	3,154,375		4,035,575		5,478,741		7,029,349		8,487,317		7,928,901		7,364,570		6,519,789	
*The category "other Christians" was distinguished from "other religions" since the census of 2021. **The category "unaffiliated" comprises those who, since the census of 2001, answered either "no religion" or that they "could/would not define" their religion. ***In the census of 2011, Bulgarians were allowed to avoid giving answer to the question on religion, so the category comprises both persons who did not answer the question and who did not file a census return. However, in the 2021 census, the "Not answered" category specifically refers to people who did not submit a census return, whether due to absence or unwillingness to speak to census takers, and whose data were therefore retrieved from administrative sources.

=== Line chart of the trends, 1887–2021 ===
Census statistics 1887–2021: Raw data

=== Religion by province ===
Religious affiliations in Bulgaria by province, 2021 census*
Religion	Christianity		Islam		Other religions		Unaffiliated		Unanswered	
Religion	Number	%	Number	%	Number	%	Number	%	Number	%
Blagoevgrad	196,841	67.4	52,958	18.1	173	0.1	21,736	7.4	20,519	7.0
Burgas	233,008	61.3	46,320	12.2	350	0.1	66,257	17.4	34,351	9.0
Dobrich	96,386	64.2	26,207	17.5	124	0.1	15,625	10.4	11,804	7.9
Gabrovo	76,802	78.1	4,543	4.6	53	0.05	15,243	15.5	1,746	1.8
Haskovo	134,343	63.5	27,914	13.2	117	0.1	29,028	13.7	20,163	9.5
Kardzhali	19,872	14.1	88,705	62.8	45	0.03	18,862	13.4	13,693	9.7
Kyustendil	96,474	86.3	107	0.1	64	0.1	12,315	11.0	2,776	2.5
Lovech	82,468	70.9	3,009	2.6	56	0.05	28,225	24.2	2,636	2.3
Montana	88,497	73.8	83	0.1	39	0.03	22,992	19.2	8,339	7.0
Pazardzhik	149,934	65.2	29,357	12.8	116	0.1	26,505	11.5	23,902	10.4
Pernik	97,117	85.1	165	0.1	80	0.1	14,800	13.0	2,000	1.8
Pleven	165,004	73.0	5,281	2.3	104	0.05	40,804	18.0	14,927	6.6
Plovdiv	439,779	69.3	39,851	6.3	678	0.1	95,900	15.1	58,289	9.2
Razgrad	34,548	33.5	53,121	51.5	35	0.03	8,862	8.6	6,657	6.4
Ruse	130,955	67.7	25,514	13.2	171	0.1	24,187	12.5	12,656	6.5
Shumen	72,792	48.1	47,752	31.5	82	0.1	18,550	12.2	12,289	8.1
Silistra	45,638	46.7	35,767	36.6	17	0.02	9,965	10.2	6,383	6.5
Sliven	103,380	59.9	11,341	6.6	100	0.1	37,453	21.7	20,416	11.8
Smolyan	23,079	24.0	39,217	40.7	68	0.1	33,115	34.4	805	0.8
Sofia	177,956	76.7	360	0.2	117	0.1	34,896	15.0	18,660	8.0
Sofia City	825,290	64.8	9,828	0.8	4,388	0.3	218,188	17.1	216,596	17.0
Stara Zagora	203,134	68.5	11,899	4.0	228	0.1	53,158	17.9	28,088	9.5
Targovishte	39,836	40.6	39,481	40.2	40	0.04	11,052	11.7	7,735	7.9
Varna	290,407	67.2	25,738	6.0	639	0.1	75,012	17.4	40,402	9.3
Veliko Tarnovo	149,662	72.2	12,525	6.0	190	0.1	30,802	14.9	14,192	6.8
Vidin	64,086	85.0	51	0.1	26	0.03	9,606	12.7	1,639	2.2
Vratsa	107,264	70.2	715	0.5	37	0.02	41,991	27.5	2,806	1.8
Yambol	74,718	68.1	899	0.8	50	0.05	21,814	19.9	12,212	11.1
* –Highlighted in each column's associated colour is the area where that column's religious or irreligious view has its relative highest percentage. –Highlighted in greenish yellow are the religions which have a relative or absolute percentage majority in each province.

=== Religion by ethnicity ===
Major ethnic groups of Bulgaria by major religions, 2021 census
Religion	Bulgarians		Bulgarian Turks		Romani Bulgarians	
Religion	Number	%	Number	%	Number	%
Bulgarian Orthodox Christianity	3,980,131	77.8	4,435	0.9	75,745	28.4
Protestantism	34,152	0.7	–	–	32,325	12.1
Roman Catholicism	33,749	0.7	–	–	–	–
Islam	107,777	2.1	447,893	88.1	45,817	17.2
Unaffiliated	436,652	8.5	28,817	5.7	78,749	29.5
Not answered	526,033	10.3	27,233	5.4	34,084	12.8
Total population	5,118,494		508,378		266,720	

== History ==
=== 7th–14th century — Pagan and Christian Bulgarian empires ===
The Bulgarian nation emerged in the Early Middle Ages (7th–10th century CE) as an amalgam of ethnic elements of different origins: Southern Slavs, who populated the Balkans from the 5th century; pre-Slavic native populations, the Thracians who had been Hellenised and Romanised during the previous foreign dominations; and Bulgars, a Turkic population who migrated from Central Asia to the Danube region and founded the First Bulgarian Empire (681–1018). The Bulgarian khans dominated over this heterogeneous population, whose components originally co-existed as separate communities with their own religious systems and traditions (Slavic paganism the Slavs, Thracian paganism the Thracians, and Tengrism the Bulgars). Christianity was adopted — in its Byzantine Orthodox form, then still part of a United Church, from the neighbouring Byzantine Empire — as an ideological and ethnic homogeniser around 864 by the khan Boris-Mihail; the Christianisation of Bulgaria was largely a political expedient which granted the Bulgarian khans the same status as other European monarchs, but it also met considerable opposition, especially from the aristocracy and even from Boris-Mihail's son and heir to the throne, Vladimir-Rasate, who tried to suppress Christianity and revert to paganism as he saw the former as a tool of political yoke from Byzantium.

In 870, the Christian hierarchs of Bulgaria took part in the Fourth Council of Constantinople, and the council granted the Bulgarian Orthodox Church the status of an autonomous archbishopric under the Patriarchate of Constantinople, from which it obtained its first primate, clergy and theological books. In 919, the Bulgarian knyeaz Simeon adopted the new title "tsar of the Bulgarians and the Romans" (tsar was an adapted form of the Latin title caesar; the change reflected an ideal acquisition of the Roman imperial tradition) and heightened the Bulgarian Orthodox Church to the status of autocephalous patriarchate, independent from the Patriarchate of Constantinople. Sixteen years before, in 893, an ecclesiastical council decided to switch to Old Church Slavonic (Old Bulgarian) as the liturgical language, and in the meanwhile the Cyrillic alphabet was developed for writing the Slavic language; such changes protected the Bulgarians from Hellenisation, and ultimately would have been fundamental for the later history of part of the Slavic peoples. In 927, the autocephaly of the Bulgarian Orthodox Church was recognised by the Patriarchate of Constantinople.

The emerging Bulgarian Orthodox Church retained many elements of pre-Christian paganisms. Moreover, since the 10th century Bulgarian Christianity was deeply characterised by the Gnostic doctrine of Bogomilism, developed in Bulgaria itself by the priest Bogomil, as well as by the ascetic doctrine of Hesychasm. Both Bogomilism and Hesychasm were highly spiritual, mystical and meditative doctrines and practices, favouring the inner (esoteric) path to God and organised around monasticism, but while the former was dualistic, with an accentuated distinction between spirit and matter, the latter was monistic and spread to Bulgaria largely as a reaction to the former.

=== 14th–19th century — Ottoman Bulgaria ===
In 1396, the disintegrating potentates of the Second Bulgarian Empire (1185–1396) were conquered by the Ottoman Empire, a Turkish empire whose official religion was Islam, specifically Sunnism. In Ottoman Bulgaria (1396–1878), like elsewhere in the Ottoman Empire, populations were classified according to the millet (approximately "religious nation") system by religion rather than by ethnicity, and therefore Bulgarian Orthodox Christians were grouped together with Orthodox Christians of other ethnicities in the so-called Rum Millet ("Roman Nation"), all under the jurisdiction of the Patriarchate of Constantinople — therefore, the Bulgarian Orthodox Church lost its autocephaly.

When the Ottoman Muslims conquered Bulgaria they initially sought to suppress Christianity by destroying many churches and monasteries and turning other ones into mosques. Many Bulgarian Orthodox priests either perished or fled to other countries, while the Bulgarian Orthodox population was subjected to special taxes and obligations (the status of dhimmi), but was not forced to convert to Islam. Forced conversion of Bulgarian Orthodox Christians to Islam was sporadic (and sometimes those who refused to convert where executed, and were later canonised as New Martyrs by the Bulgarian Orthodox Church), while there were cases of spontaneous mass and individual conversions to the new rulers' religion. Gnosticism was not recognised under the new rule, so that most Bogomils converted to Islam, while most Paulicians became Roman Catholics (Banat Bulgarians).

Throughout the centuries of Ottoman Islamic rule, Bulgarian Orthodox monasteries had a significant role in continuing the traditions of Slavonic liturgy and Bulgarian literature, and therefore in the preservation of the ethno-national character of Slavic Bulgarians linked to Orthodox Christianity. The need to persist under Ottoman domination strengthened the conservatism of the Bulgarian Orthodox Church and insulated it from external influences, so that it remained untouched by the ideas of Protestantism when the Protestant Reformation was spreading athwart continental Europe. At the same time, however, this situation favoured a tendency to secularisation and conformism towards the state, so that the Orthodox Christian clergy lost spiritual and moral authority for many Bulgarians.

With the rise to power of the Greek Phanariot aristocracy in Constantinople, in the late Ottoman Empire the Patriarchate of Constantinople became a tool of Grecisation of all Orthodox Christians in the empire. The Bulgarians strongly opposed such tendency: Father Paisius of Hilendar (1722–1773), a native Bulgarian from the south-western town of Bansko, wrote a Slavo-Bulgarian History in the contemporary Bulgarian vernacular as a response to the "monastic nationalism" promoted by Mount Athos in Greece, and a call for Bulgarian national awakening and freedom from the yoke of Greek language and culture. In the foregoing 17th century, Bulgarian Catholics in the western parts of Bulgaria expressed support towards the Holy League of 1684 of European Christian states against the Ottoman Empire, with both diplomatic ties and armed struggle; Catholic uprisings were crushed by Ottoman authorities.

Since the early 19th century, there was a decades-long struggle of the Bulgarian Orthodox Church to regain autocephaly from the Patriarchate of Constantinople; in 1860 the authority of Constantinople was openly rejected and Greek bishops appointed by Constantinople were ousted from the church. In the same year, under the influence of French Catholic propaganda, a former Orthodox priest named Yosif Sokolski was re-ordained as a Catholic priest by Pope Pius IX and established a Bulgarian Uniate Church of the Eastern Rite in communion with the Roman Catholic Church; the experiment was short-lived, as Sokolski was soon abducted and taken to Russia while his small community dissolved. In 1870, the Ottoman sultan Abdulaziz officially set up the Bulgarian Orthodox Exarchate, while the Patriarchate of Constantinople declared it schismatic and an ethno-nationalist heresy. In the late 19th century, the government of Bulgaria, which in 1878 had become an independent state once again, was very intertwined with the Bulgarian Orthodox Church, so much that the then metropolitan of Veliko Tarnovo, Kliment (1841–1901), headed two governments, albeit short-lived.

=== 20th century — socialism, World War II, and communism ===
Beginning in the early 20th century, secularist and laicist ideas spread in Bulgaria, and the freed Bulgarian state started to disregard and sometimes restrict the autonomy and educational functions of the Bulgarian Orthodox Church. The role of the church in society began to be questioned by the emerging intelligentsia, and especially by socialist thinkers, most of whom were teachers and state employees or white collar workers. There were intellectual strifes between socialists and clergymen, and the former proposed introducing lessons on socialism in schools to replace religious teaching. One of the earliest Marxists, Dimitar Blagoev (1856–1924), while recognising the important role that the church had in past Bulgarian history, attacked it because, according to him, in modernity it had become "a tool of the bourgeoisie" and a network of the latter's "political clubs".

At the end of the World War II, in 1943, the government of Bulgaria signed an agreement with National Socialist Germany and began implementing the Final Solution against Bulgarian Jews — their deportation to death camps. The Holy Synod of the Bulgarian Orthodox Church clarified that the church did not share the racist ideology and called for a humane treatment of Jews.

On 9 September 1944, a coup d'état brought to power the Fatherland Front, a coalition of communists, agrarians and other political parties. Over the next four years, the communists, sponsored by the Soviet Union, ousted and banned all opposition parties, took full power and undertook a transformation of society according to the Stalinist model. Ostensibly, the Bulgarian Orthodox Church was granted a foremost status, and in 1945, under the pressure of Moscow and alongside the establishment of the People's Republic of Bulgaria (1945–1990), the Patriarchate of Constantinople recognised the church's autocephaly, and the metropolitan of Sofia was elected as Exarch Stefan I (1878–1957), whom, however, within three years was deposed and exiled for being not well disposed towards ecumenism and Soviet authorities. In 1950, the Holy Synod of the church adopted a new constitution which turned the church from an exarchate of Constantinople into a patriarchate of its own; Kiril (1901–1971) was elected as the first Patriarch of the fully restored auctocephalous church, which he remained until his death in 1971, when Maxim (1914–2012) was elected as his successor.

At the same time, during the period of full implementation of Stalinism, religiosity was in fact restricted, and the Bulgarian Orthodox Church became a tool of the interests of the communists in domestic and foreign politics. After the establishment of the communist republic, a number of Orthodox Christian priests were arrested and tried by "people's courts"; some of them were condemned to life imprisoned or to death. Also some Catholic priests and Protestant pastors were accused of espionage for foreign powers and other political crimes. From 1945, only civil marriage was recognised by the state, religious activities were banned in the armed forces, so were prayers and religion classes in schools, while all restrictions on atheism and free thinking were removed. Georgi Dimitrov's Constitution of 1947, which followed Stalin's Constitution of the Soviet Union of 1936, proclaimed freedom of religion and worship and the separation of religion and state; Todor Zhivkov's Constitution of 1971 declared freedom of both religious rites and antireligious activities, and the principles of both constitutions were reinforced with a 1949 Law on Religious Denominations. The law blandly proclaimed atheism as the dominant view supported by the state.

In general, communist Bulgaria, while taking the Soviet Union as a model, never imitated Bolshevik extreme methods of forbidding religion completely and destroying places of worship. Georgi Dimitrov, who was communist leader from 1946 to 1949 and was born in a Protestant family, in a 1946 speech on the occasion of the thousandth anniversary of John of Rila, the patron saint of Bulgaria, praised the Orthodox Church for its historical role and for preserving national identity and culture. Islam and the Turkicised minority of the population who practised it faced a worse treatment than Christianity under communism; in the 1970s and 1980s mosques were closed and Islamic religious practice was restricted, the properties of Islamic charities (waqf) were confiscated, Islamic imams were persecuted, traditional Islamic names were forbidden and forcibly changed to Bulgarian ones, and severe restrictions were placed on Turkish language, so that many Bulgarian Muslims left the country for Turkey.

=== 1990–21st century — contemporary Bulgaria ===
After the end of the communist rule in Bulgaria in 1990, the Bulgarian Orthodox Church had the opportunity to recover from spiritual and institutional stagnation. However, already weakened, it experienced serious problems both within itself and in its relationship with society: its ecclesiastical hierarchy did not renew itself after communism and therefore was seen as a continuation of the communist bureaucracy, and within society heated debates broke out about its involvement with the erstwhile regime; moreover, in 1992 part of the clergy claimed that the election of Patriarch Maxim was invalid as he was in fact installed by the communists. The clergy thus divided itself into two factions: the Holy Synod led by Maxim, and another synod headed by Pimen of Nevrokop, whom in 1996 was elected by a schismatic council as a rival Patriarch.

Islam recovered better than the Bulgarian Orthodox Church after the communist period, because the harsher persecutions to which Muslims were subjected ultimately strengthened their faith, so that in contemporary Bulgaria the activities of Muslims have become more visible and pronounced, politically active, and Islamic organisations have multiplied. The repatriation of those Bulgarian Muslims who had fled communist Bulgaria for Turkey also reinvigorated the Muslim population. Today, Bulgarian Muslims are ethnically and religiously diversified: they comprise Muslim Bulgarians or Pomaks, Turks, Romanies and Tatars, under the denominations of Sunnism, the majority, and Shiism, a minority with a strong Sufi tradition.

The transformation of Bulgarian society after the fall of communism has also led to the spread of Eastern religions, various new religious movements, the newest denominations of Protestantism, and Restorationism. A new religious movement indigenous to Bulgaria is Dunovism, a form of Neo-Theosophy also known as the Universal White Brotherhood, which was founded in the early 20th century by the spiritual teacher Peter Deunov (1864–1944) and has undergone a great revival in its home country and an international propagation since the 1990s. The late 20th and early 21st century have also seen the appearance of Neopagan religious movements in Bulgaria, including Slavic Rodnovery (often with elements of Turco-Mongol Tengrism), Celtic Druidry, and Thracian Hellenism. According to the scholar Antoaneta Nikolova, Bulgarian society has been particularly well receptive to the spread of teachings from Eastern religions because of both the traditional mystical and esoteric character of Bulgarian Orthodox Christianity and the influence of Dunovism, the latter of which also directly incorporated Eastern elements. Additionally, during the communist period, the daughter of the leader Todor Zhivkov, Lyudmila Zhivkova (1942-1981), developed a strong interest in Eastern teachings and Russian Roerichism - itself, like Dunovism, being a Neo-Theosophical movement incorporating Eastern elements -, and popularised them in Bulgaria.

== Religions and life stances ==
=== Christianity ===
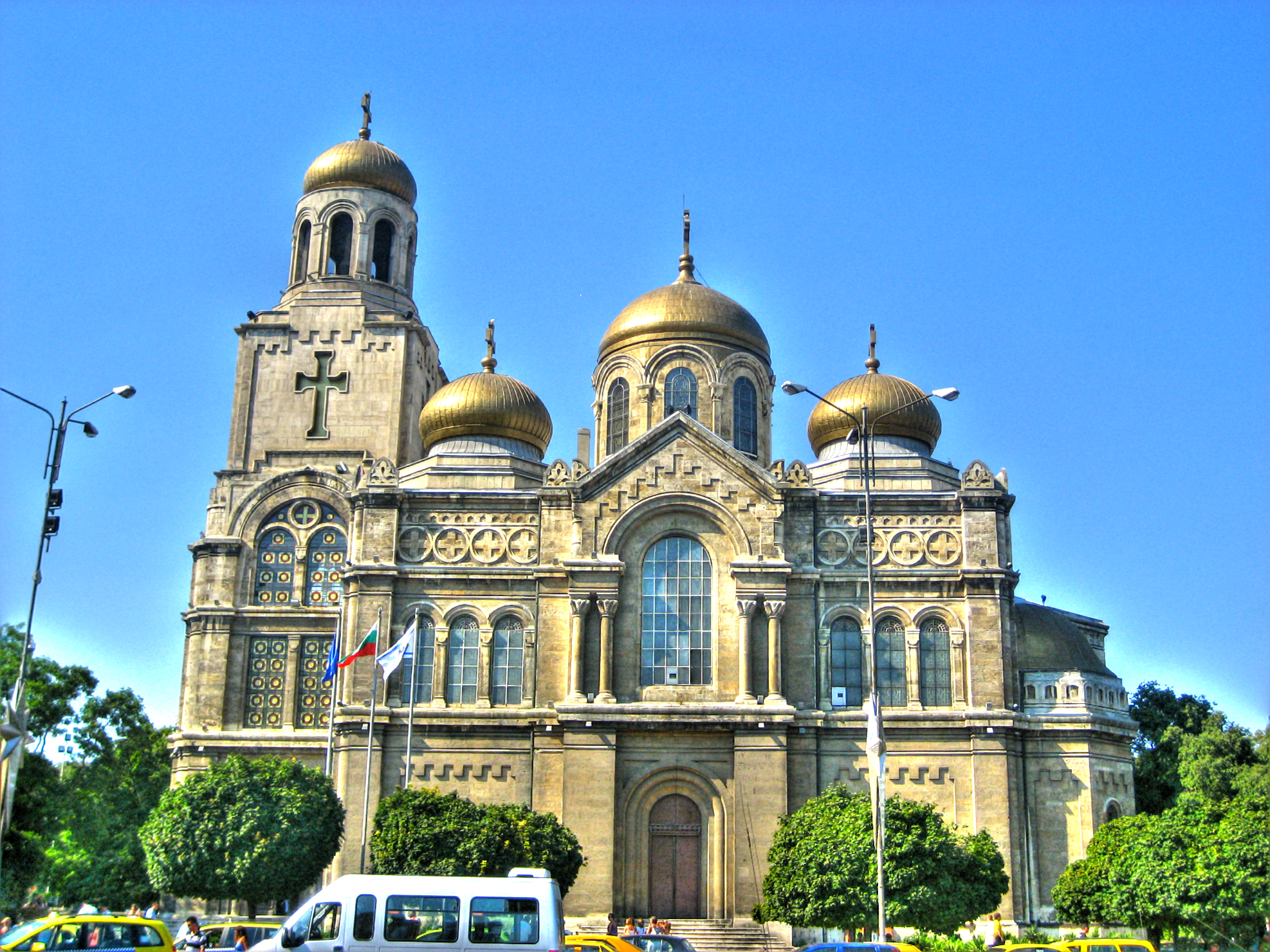
Cathedral of the Dormition of the Mother of God in Varna.

Catholic Cathedral of Saint Joseph in Sofia.

According to the official census of the year 2021, Christianity was the dominant religion of Bulgaria adhered to by 64.7% of the population. Almost all Christians in Bulgaria are Eastern Orthodox, incorporated by the Bulgarian Orthodox Church, which was the religious belonging of 62.7% of the population in 2021. Eastern Orthodox Christianity is declared as being the "traditional religion" of Bulgaria in the country's constitution. In Bulgaria there are also Catholics, Protestants, and a small community of Armenians, followers of the Armenian Apostolic Church.

However, Christianity has been on the decline since the early 1990s, the number of Bulgarian Christians having decreased in both absolute number and percentage from around 7,3 million or 86.6% of the population in the census of 1992 to 4,2 million, or the aforementioned 64.7%, in 2021; most of the decline has been in the Bulgarian Orthodox Church (from 7,2 million or 85.7% in 1992, to 4,1 million or the aforementioned 62.7% in 2021). Armenian Apostolics have also decreased; they were a few tens of thousands in the 1920s and are about five thousand today. On the other hand, over the same period the number of believers in other small Christian denominations present in the country has been stable or has increased moderately: Catholics have remained between forty and fifty thousand or 0.6% of the population, while Protestants and other non-Catholic and non-Orthodox Christians have grown from twenty thousand believers or 0.3% in 1992 to around eighty thousand or 1.3% in 2021.

Protestantism in Bulgaria is represented by two different streams: older denominations that were established in the country in the 20th century, the most stable of which are Methodism, Congregationalism and Baptist Christianity, and newer denominations including Pentecostalism and small independent churches, and Restorationism, which includes Mormonism, the Jehovah's Witnesses and Unificationism. Half of the Protestants in Bulgaria are Slavic Bulgarians, while the other half are Romani Bulgarians.

There are also old believer communities in Bulgaria, mainly in the village of Kazachko, inhabited by people with don and kuban cossack heritage.

=== Islam ===
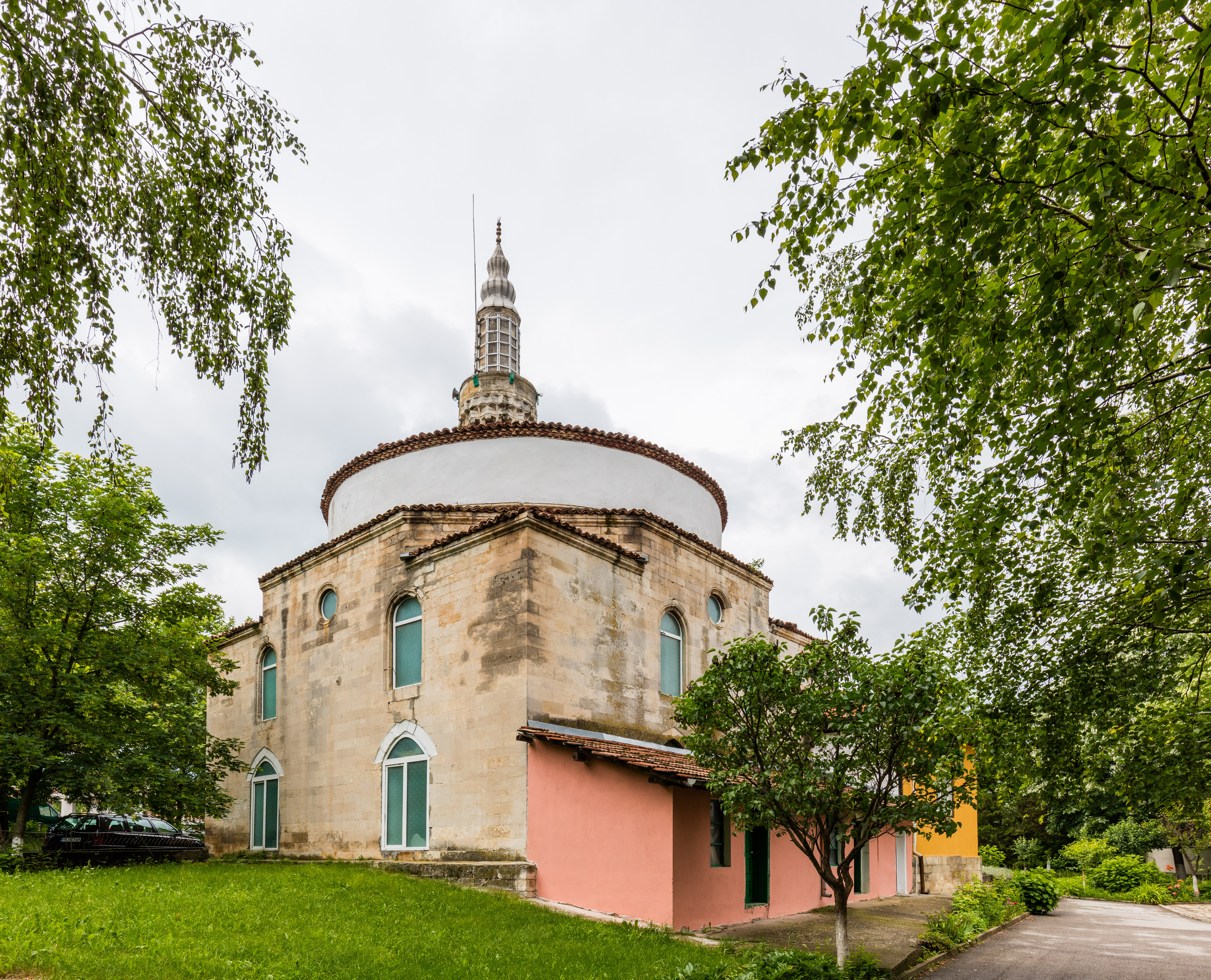
Ahmet Bey Mosque in Razgrad.

Islam is the second largest religion in Bulgaria, adhered to by 9.8% of the population, or about six hundred thousand people, according to the census of 2021. The Bulgarian Muslim community is ethnically diversified, comprising Muslim Bulgarians or Pomaks, and Turkish, Romani and Tatar Muslims. These ethnic groups are also divided along the different Islamic currents they follow: a majority of them adhere to Sunnism, while a minority adhere to Shiism. Bulgarian Shiites are also known in the country as Aliani or Kazilbash, which means "Red Heads" and refers to their distinguishing traditional red headgears with twelve stripes representing the Twelve Imams of Twelverism, the largest form of Shiism. Most of the Kazilbash are found in the northeastern part of Bulgaria; their religion spread to the area between the 15th and the 17th century in association with Sufi orders. The Kazilbash have historically been considered heterodox or heretical by the Sunnis, and therefore they have often hidden their religious identity.

=== Other religions, unaffiliated, and neither religiously nor irreligiously identified people ===
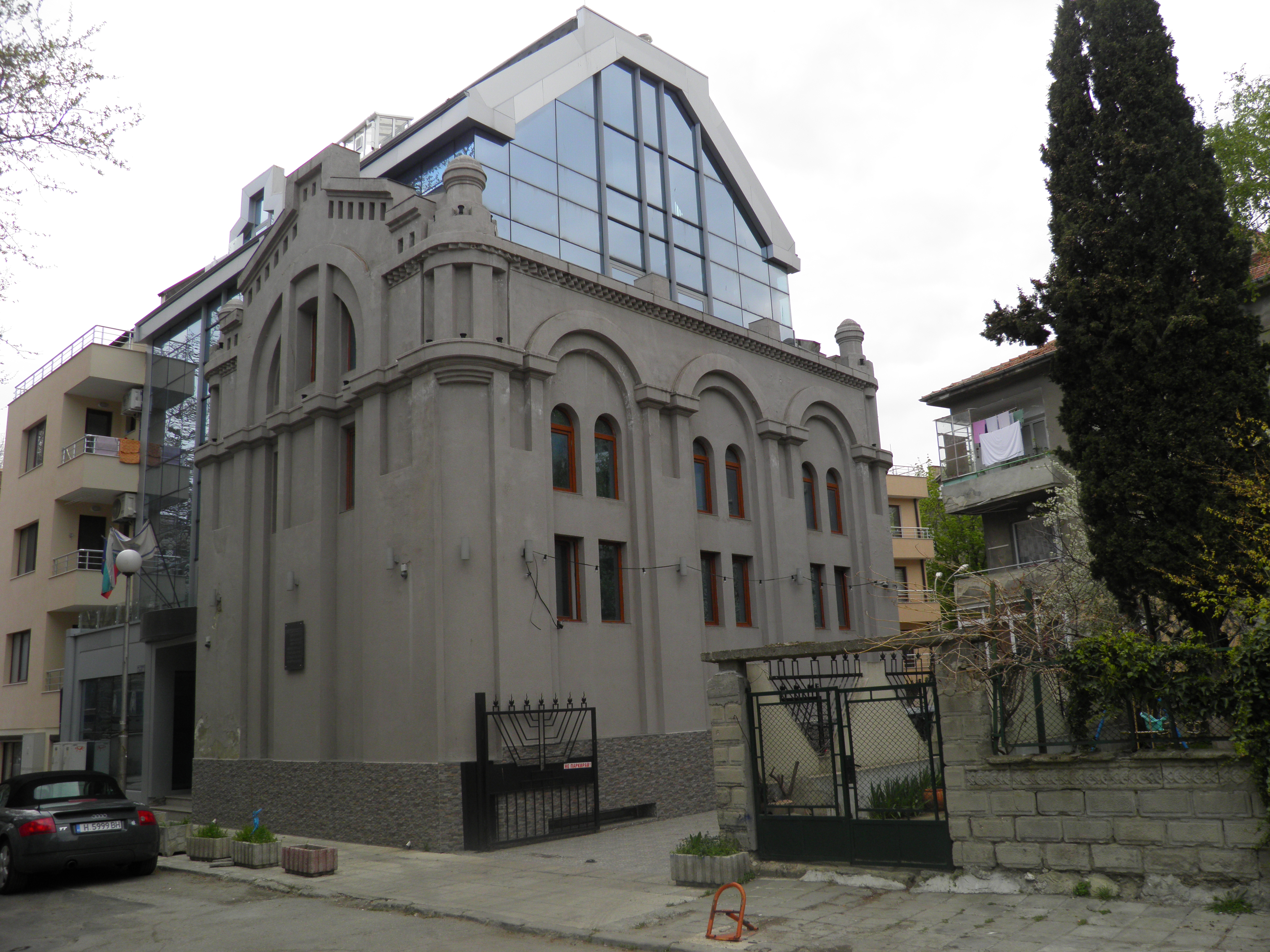
Ashkenazi synagogue in Varna.

According to the census of 2021, there were minorities of religious Jews (1,736) and other religions (6,451) within the country. At the same time, around 1 million Bulgarians, or 15.9% of the population, did not declare a religious affiliation; among these, 305,102 or 4.7% declared to have no religion at all, 472,606 or 7,2% responded that they could/would not define a religious affiliation, which does not necessarily imply atheism. An additional 9.5% or 616,681 people chose not to respond to the census' question on religion. Since the 1990s, Bulgarian society has witnessed the spread of Eastern religions and new religious movements, including Krishnaism, yoga schools and the Baháʼí Faith.

A peculiar new religious movement that is indigenous to Bulgaria itself and has experienced a strong revival since the 1990s is Dunovism, also known by its collective name, the Universal White Brotherhood, founded in the early 20th century by Peter Deunov. It is a Neo-Theosophical religion whose doctrine blends ideas from Eastern religions, Bogomilism and broader Gnosticism, teaching that God is a mystical intuition, and is found in the connection of fraternal love between all souls and the condition for the spiritual development of all persons. Intertwined with the Esperanto movement, environmentalism and vegetarianism, it has been spread internationally beyond Bulgaria, to broader Europe, South America, North America and Japan, primarily by Bulgarian emigrants. The doctrine of the movement also holds that the Slavs in general have to play a special historical mission in the world.

Slavic Rodnovery (often with Tengrist elements), Celtic Druidry, and Thracian Hellenism are Neopagan movements present in Bulgaria. As of 2013, the number and influence of Slavic Rodnovers were small. During the 1990s and 2000s, a number of Rodnover groups were established in Bulgaria, including the Dulo Alliance and the Bulgarian Horde 1938. Some Bulgarian Rodnovers identify themselves as descendants of the Bulgars and therefore lean towards the Central Asian shamanic type of Rodnovery, influenced by the ancient religion , Tengrism; these Rodnovers are represented by the Tangra Warriors Movement (Bulgarian: Движение "Воини на Тангра"). Rodnover groups in Bulgaria have been described as having strong political orientation, being highly nationalistic, anti-Western, and anti-Semitic. Rodnover personalities and groups played a prominent role in the establishment of the far-right organisation Ongal in 2002.
