= 2011 Bulgarian census =

The 2011 population census in Bulgaria was conducted between February 1 and 28 by the National Statistical Institute (NSI). It is the 17th population census in the demographic history of Bulgaria. It was carried out using two methods of information collection - electronically (1-9 February 2011) through an on-line census on the Internet and traditionally through visits by enumerators and the completion of a paper census card (10-28 February 2011). For the first time in Bulgaria, a census is being conducted via the Internet. As of February 1 2011, the population of Bulgaria was 7,364,570, of whom 3,777,999 (51.3%) were women and 3,586,571 (48.7%) were men.

== Results ==
=== Settlements ===
Distribution of settlements according to the size of their population as of February 1, 2011:

	Populated areas	Population	Percentage of total population	Average number of inhabitants in one settlement
Total	5,302	7,364,570	100.00	1,389.01
0	181	0	0.00	0.00
1–10	417	1,960	0.02	4.70
11–50	703	19,596	0.26	27.87
51–100	522	38,923	0.52	74.56
101–500	1,927	501,828	6.81	260.41
501–1,000	750	529,684	7.19	706.24
1,001–10,000	725	1,685,472	22.88	2,324.78
10,001–50,000	58	1,237,904	16.80	21,343.17
50,001–100,000	12	876,356	11.89	73,021.33
Over 100,000	7	2,472,847	33.57	353,263.85

=== Age-sex structure ===
Population pyramid 2011
%	Males	Age	Females	%
1.0		85+		1.9
2.0		80–84		3.2
3.3		75–79		4.8
4.0		70–74		5.3
5.1		65–69		6.2
6.9		60–64		7.7
7.0		55–59		7.2
7.2		50–54		6.9
7.0		45–49		6.5
7.4		40–44		6.6
7.8		35–39		7.0
7.7		30–34		6.8
7.1		25–29		6.2
7.0		20–24		6.3
5.4		15–19		4.9
4.5		10–14		4.1
4.6		5–9		4.1
4.9		0–4		4.4

==== Age-sex structure of the population ====
Age (years)	Population			Age (years)	Percentage		
Age (years)	Total	Men	Women	Age (years)	Total	Men	Women
Total	7,364,570	3,586,571	3,777,999	Total	100.0	100.0	100.0
85+	107,479	36,390	71,089	85+	1.5	1.0	1.9
80–84	191,309	71,526	119,783	80–84	2.6	2.0	3.2
75–79	301,851	119,774	182,077	75–79	4.1	3.3	4.8
70–74	345,327	143,726	201,601	70–74	4.7	4.0	5.3
65–79	415,431	182,565	232,866	65–79	5.6	5.1	6.2
60–64	540,980	248,710	292,270	60–64	7.4	6.9	7.7
55–59	523,827	251,297	272,530	55–59	7.1	7.0	7.2
50–54	516,851	256,509	260,342	50–54	7.0	7.2	6.9
45–49	495,672	251,056	244,616	45–49	6.7	7.0	6.5
40–44	513,814	263,969	249,845	40–44	7.0	7.4	6.6
35–39	545,332	281,170	264,162	35–39	7.4	7.8	7.0
30–34	533,945	276,726	257,219	30–34	7.3	7.7	6.8
25–29	491,088	255,616	235,472	25–29	6.7	7.1	6.2
20–24	488,807	251,720	237,087	20–24	6.6	7.0	6.3
15–19	377,585	194,099	183,486	15–19	5.1	5.4	4.9
10–15	315,466	162,159	153,307	10–15	4.3	4.5	4.1
5–10	316,643	163,076	153,567	5–10	4.3	4.6	4.1
0–4	343,163	176,483	166,680	0–4	4.7	4.9	4.4

=== Ethnic composition ===
Ethnic composition of settlements.

Percentage of Turks in settlements: 50–100 25–50

Percentage of Turks, by district.

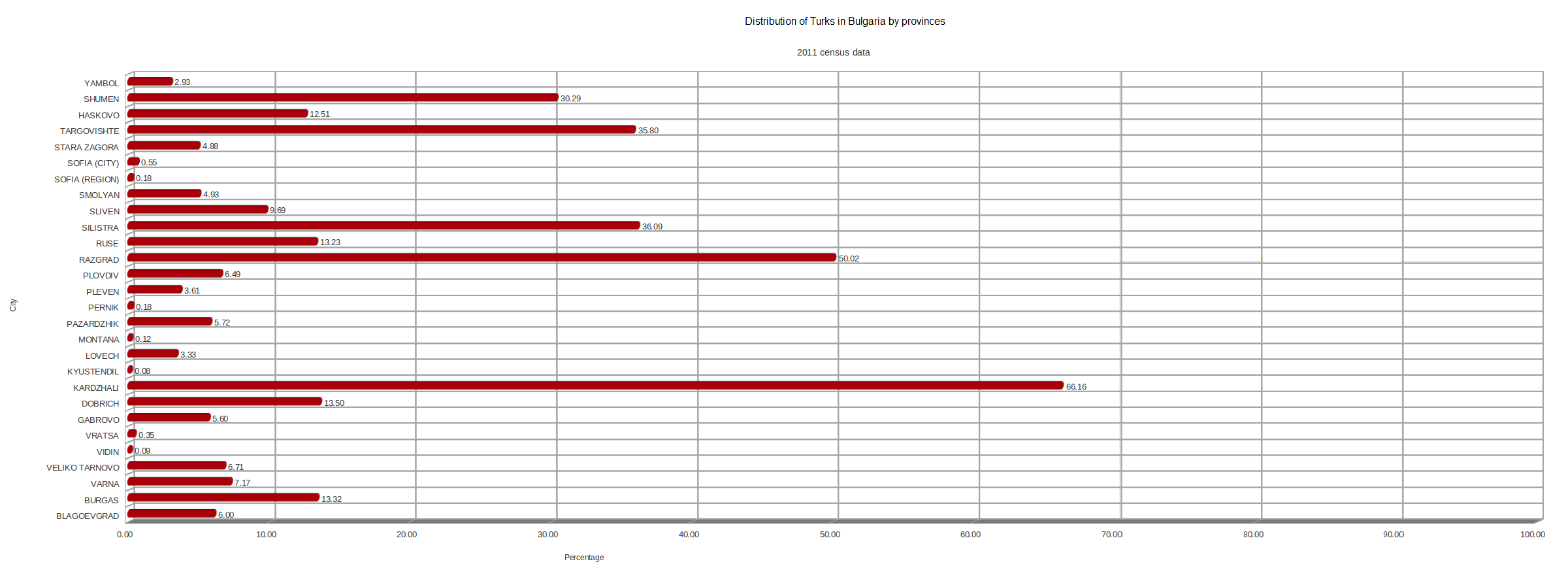
Percentage of Turks, by district.

Population and percentage of ethnic groups by district:

District	Population							District	Percentage					
District	Total	Bulgarians	Turks	Romanis	Other	Doesn't self-describe	Didn't answer	District	Bulgarians	Turks	Romanis	Other	Doesn't self-describe	Didn't answer
Total	7,364,570	5,664,624	588,318	325,343	49,304	53,391	683,590	100.00	76.91	7.98	4.41	0.66	0.72	9.28
Blagoevgrad	323,552	251,097	17,027	9,739	3,080	2,613	39,996	Blagoevgrad	77.60	5.26	3.01	0.95	0.80	12.36
Burgas	415,817	298,128	49,354	18,424	2,632	2,006	45,273	Buras	71.69	11.86	4.43	0.63	0.48	10.88
Varna	475,074	371,048	30,469	13,432	5,638	4,306	50,181	Varna	78.10	6.41	2.82	1.18	0.90	10.56
Veliko Tarnovo	258,494	211,353	15,709	3,875	1,145	1,910	24,502	Veliko Tarnovo	81.76	6.07	1.49	0.44	0.73	9.47
Vidin	101,018	86,802	85	7,282	466	491	5,892	Vidin	85.92	0.08	7.20	0.46	0.48	5.83
Vratsa	186,848	151,183	565	10,082	434	771	23,813	Vratsa	80.91	0.30	5.39	0.23	0.41	12.74
Gabrovo	122,702	106,406	6,464	1,305	533	650	7,344	Gabrovo	86.71	5.26	1.06	0.43	0.52	5.98
Dobrich	189,677	131,114	23,484	15,323	1,609	2,369	15,778	Dobrich	69.12	12.38	8.07	0.84	1.24	8.31
Kardzhali	152,808	39,519	86,527	1,296	753	2,686	22,027	Kardzhali	25.86	56.62	0.84	0.49	1.75	14.41
Kyustendil	136,686	121,351	105	8,305	354	500	6,071	Kyustendil	88.78	0.07	6.07	0.25	0.36	4.44
Lovech	141,422	118,346	4,337	5,705	911	881	11,242	Lovech	83.68	3.06	4.03	0.64	0.62	7.94
Montana	148,098	123,820	171	18,228	420	828	4,631	Montana	83.60	0.11	12.30	0.28	0.55	3.12
Pazardzhik	275,548	206,110	14,062	20,350	2,123	3,357	29,546	Pazardzhik	74.80	5.10	7.38	0.77	1.21	10.72
Pernik	133,530	120,929	231	3,560	259	443	8,108	Pernik	90.56	0.17	2.66	0.19	0.33	6.07
Pleven	269,752	219,612	8,666	9,961	826	1,200	29,487	Pleven	81.41	3.21	3.69	0.30	0.44	10.93
Plovdiv	683,027	540,303	40,255	30,202	3,985	5,628	62,654	Plovdiv	79.10	5.89	4.42	0.58	0.82	9.17
Razgrad	125,190	49,229	57,261	5,719	702	1,564	10,715	Razgrad	39.32	45.73	4.56	0.56	1.24	8.55
Ruse	235,252	176,413	28,658	8,615	1,869	1,057	18,640	Ruse	74.98	12.18	3.66	0.79	0.44	7.92
Silistra	119,474	64,050	40,272	5,697	974	597	7,884	Silistra	53.60	33.70	4.76	0.81	0.49	6.59
Sliven	197,473	132,697	16,784	20,478	1,954	1,293	24,267	Sliven	67.19	8.49	10.37	0.98	0.65	12.28
Smolyan	121,752	86,847	4,696	448	1,826	1,358	26,577	Smolyan	71.33	3.85	0.36	1.49	1.11	21.82
Sofia City	1,291,591	1,136,433	6,526	18,284	9,848	7,240	113,260	Sofia City	87.98	0.50	1.41	0.76	0.56	8.76
Sofia	247,489	210,974	422	17,079	646	1,660	16,708	Sofia	85.24	0.17	6.90	0.26	0.67	6.75
Stara Zagora	333,265	265 618	15,035	24,018	1,715	1,720	25,159	Stara Zagora	79.70	4.51	7.20	0.51	0.51	7.54
Targovishte	120,818	58,371	38,231	7,767	959	1,472	14,018	Targovishte	48.31	31.64	6.42	0.79	1.21	11.60
Haskovo	246,238	180,541	28,444	15,889	891	1,617	18,856	Haskovo	73.31	11.55	6.45	0.36	0.65	7.65
Shumen	180,528	99,446	50,878	13,847	2,093	1,688	12,576	Ш	55.08	28.18	7.67	1.15	0.93	6.96
Yambol	131,447	106,884	3,600	10,433	659	1,486	8,385	Yambol	81.31	2.73	7.93	0.50	1.13	6.37

==== Municipalities ====
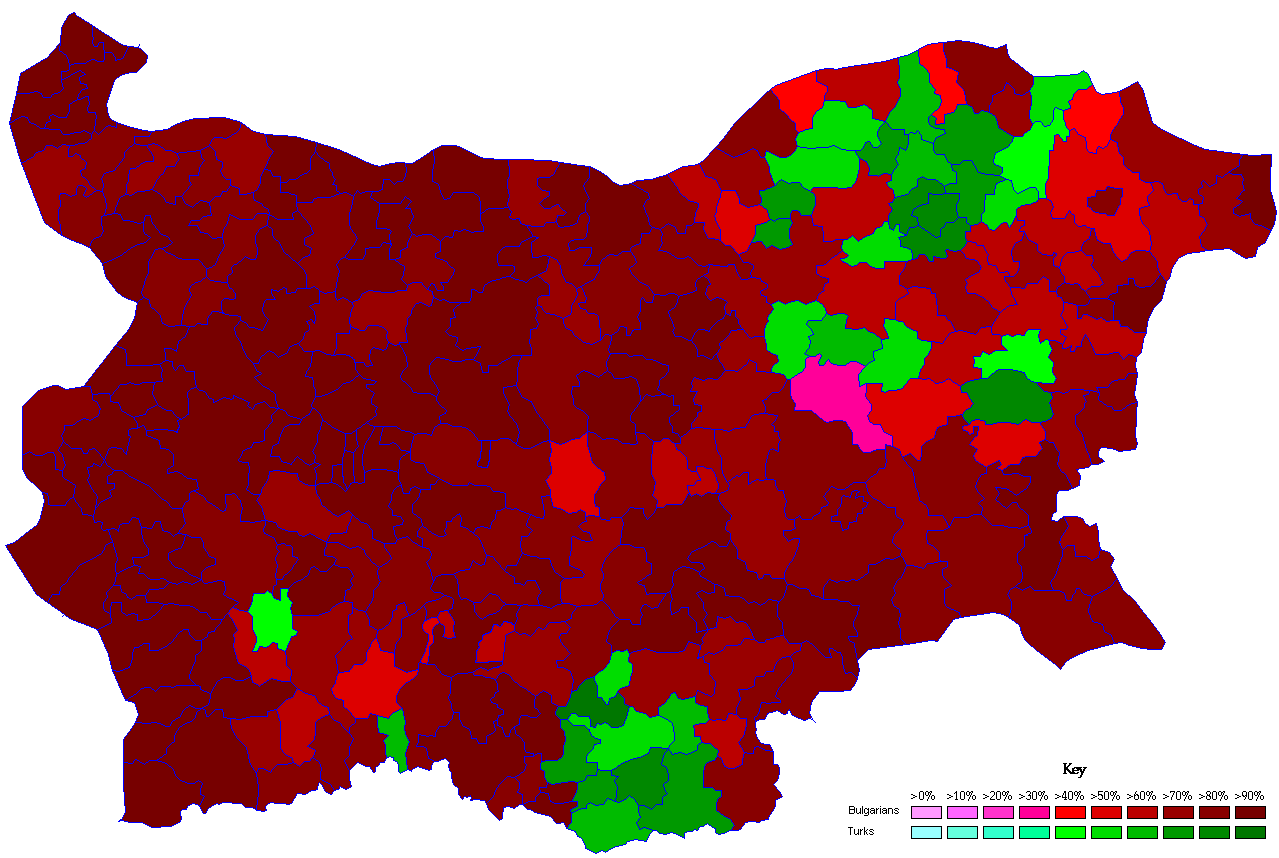
Ethnic composition of municipalities.

Percentage of Turks, by municipality.

Number of Turks, by municipality.

Percentage of Romanis, by municipality.

Number and percentage of ethnic groups by municipality:

Municipality	Population							Municipality	Percentage					
Municipality	Total	Bulgarians	Turks	Romanis	Others	Doesn't self describe	Didn't answer	Municipality	Bulgarians	Turks	Romanis	Others	Doesn't self describe	Didn't answer
Total	7,364,570	5,664,624	588,318	325,343	49,304	53,391	683,590	100.00	76.91	7.98	4.41	0.66	0.72	9.28
Aytos	28,687	13,847	8,766	3,101	77	223	2,673	Aytos	48.26	30.55	10.80	0.26	0.77	9.31
Avren	8,574	5,437	1,502	902	130	194	409	Avren	63.41	17.51	10.52	1.51	2.26	4.77
Aksakovo	20,426	14,284	316	2,309	1,071	193	2,253	Aksakovo	69.93	1.54	11.30	5.24	0.94	11.03
Alfatar	3,036	2,201	453	329	8	0	45	Alfatar	72.49	14.92	10.83	0.26	0.00	1.48
Anton	1,599	1,407	3	37	8	96	48	Anton	87.99	0.18	2.31	0.50	6.00	3.00
Antonovo	6,262	1,660	2,975	1,212	7	84	324	Antonovo	26.50	47.50	19.35	0.11	1.34	5.17
Aprilitsi	3,338	3,189	16	8			120	Aprilitsi	95.53	0.47	0.23			3.59
Ardino	11,572	2,488	6,585	0	66	113	2,320	Ardino	21.50	56.90	0.00	0.57	0.97	20.04
Asenovgrad	64,034	45,242	11,826	633	106	451	5,776	Asenovgrad	70.65	18.46	0.98	0.16	0.70	9.02
Banite	4,923	4,170	19	0	9	36	689	Banite	84.70	0.38	0.00	0.18	0.73	13.99
Bansko	13,125	11,903	14	227	54	31	896	Bansko	90.68	0.10	1.72	0.41	0.23	6.82
Balchik	20,317	12,690	3,083	2,194	350	400	1,600	Balchik	62.46	15.17	10.79	1.72	1.96	7.87
Batak	6,144	3,285	2,356	211	9	13	270	Batak	53.46	38.34	3.43	0.14	0.21	4.39
Belene	10,318	7,397	292	92	23	31	2,483	Belene	71.69	2.83	0.89	0.22	0.30	24.06
Belitsa	9,927	4,450	2,215	186	198	342	2,536	Belitsa	44.82	22.31	1.87	1.99	3.44	25.54
Belogradchik	6,602	4,765	5	1,206			597	Belogradchik	72.17	0.07	18.26			9.04
Belovo	8,891	8,273	5	375	33	12	193	Belovo	93.04	0.05	4.21	0.37	0.13	2.17
Beloslav	11,023	8,727	760	64	255	156	1,061	Beloslav	79.17	6.89	0.58	2.31	1.41	9.62
Berkovitsa	18,803	15,065	12	3,059	76	75	516	Berkovitsa	80.12	0.06	16.26	0.40	0.39	2.74
Blagoevgrad	77,441	68,702	126	1,836	700	282	5,795	Blagoevgrad	88.71	0.16	2.37	0.90	0.36	7.48
Bobov Dol	9,067	8,082	48	290	37	31	579	Bobov Dol	89.13	0.52	3.19	0.40	0.34	6.38
Boboshevo	2,870	2,801	3	1	4	5	56	Boboshevo	97.59	0.10	0.03	0.13	0.17	1.95
Bozhurishte	8,473	8,015	28	48	32	25	325	Bozhuriste	94.59	0.33	0.56	0.37	0.29	3.83
Boynitsa	1,341	1,095	0	0			221	Boynitsa	81.65	0.00	0.00			16.48
Boychinovtsi	9,272	7,864	23	1,051	23	92	219	Boychinovtsi	84.81	0.24	11.33	0.24	0.99	2.36
Bolyarovo	4,160	3,312	33	566	27	19	203	Bolyarovo	79.61	0.79	13.60	0.64	0.45	4.87
Borino	3,641	1,117	2,107	5	22	19	371	Borino	30.67	57.86	0.13	0.60	0.52	10.18
Borovan	5,714	4,713	7	359	10	25	600	Borovan	82.48	0.12	6.28	0.17	0.43	10.50
Borovo	6,101	3,791	1,005	1,000	28	29	248	Borovo	62.13	16.47	16.39	0.45	0.47	4.06
Botevgrad	33,175	27,503	23	2,843	43	123	2,640	Botevgrad	82.90	0.06	8.56	0.12	0.37	7.95
Bratya Daskalovi	8,677	6,169	734	1,139	10	33	592	Bratya Daskalovi	71.09	8.45	13.12	0.11	0.38	6.82
Bratsigovo	9,648	7,652	650	395	29	42	880	Bratsigovo	79.31	6.73	4.09	0.30	0.43	9.12
Bregovo	5,514	5,147	0	152	66	32	117	Bregovo	93.34	0.00	2.75	1.19	0.58	2.12
Breznik	6,945	6,410	7	189	11	12	316	Breznik	92.29	0.10	2.72	0.15	0.17	4.55
Brezovo	7,298	5,695	34	1,094	13	23	439	Brezovo	78.03	0.46	14.99	0.17	0.31	6.01
Brusartsi	5,078	3,976	3	944	14	106	35	Brusartsi	78.29	0.05	18.58	0.27	2.08	0.88
Burgas	212,902	179,383	6,264	3,871	1,407	728	21,249	Burgas	84.25	2.94	1.81	0.66	0.34	9.98
Byala (Varna Province)	3,242	2,458	308	103	18	10	345	Byala (Varna Province)	75.81	9.50	3.17	0.55	0.30	10.64
Byala (Ruse Province)	13,467	10,480	731	1,669	35	110	442	Byala (Ruse Province)	77.81	5.42	12.39	0.25	0.81	3.28
Byala Slatina	24,606	17,743	323	2,544	36	191	3,769	Byala Slatina	72.10	1.31	10.33	0.14	0.77	15.31
Varna	343,704	290,780	11,089	3,535	3,481	2,315	32,504	Varna	84.60	3.22	1.02	1.01	0.67	9.45
Veliki Preslav	13,382	7,936	3,078	943	157	98	1,170	Veliki Preslav	59.30	23.00	7.04	1.17	0.73	8.74
Veliko Tarnovo	88,670	75,570	3,681	595	350	313	8,161	Veliko Tarnovo	85.22	4.15	0.67	0.39	0.35	9.20
Velingrad	40 707	26 055	1540	2141	1279	1629	8063	Velingrad	64.00	3.78	5.25	3.14	4.00	19.80
Venets	7,137	122	5707	506	3	73	726	Venets	1.70	79.96	7.08	0.04	1.02	10.17
Vetovo	12,450	3,145	6,044	1,744	338	52	1,127	Vetovo	25.26	48.54	14.00	2.71	0.41	9.05
Vetrino	5,415	3,457	972	144	55	39	748	Vetrino	63.84	17.95	2.65	1.01	0.72	13.81
Vidin	63,257	54,546	66	3,753	322	345	4,225	Vidin	86.22	0.10	5.93	0.50	0.54	6.67
Vratsa	73,894	64,334	61	2,215	207	258	6,819	Vratsa	87.06	0.08	2.99	0.28	0.34	9.22
Valchi Dol	10,052	5,539	1,942	1,068	35	82	1,386	Valchi Dol	55.10	19.31	10.62	0.34	0.81	13.78
Valchedram	9,900	7,628	24	1,954	12	58	224	Valchedram	77.05	0.24	19.73	0.12	0.58	2.26
Varbitsa	10,391	919	5,597	2,434	675	220	546	Varbitsa	8.84	53.86	23.42	6.49	2.11	5.25
Varshets	8,203	6,342	4	1,348	18	26	465	Varshets	77.31	0.04	16.43	0.21	0.31	5.66
Gabrovo	65,268	60,207	504	367	224	170	3,796	Gabrovo	92.24	0.77	0.56	0.34	0.26	5.81
General Toshevo	15,097	10,619	1,270	1,811	233	99	1,065	General Toshevo	70.33	8.41	11.90	1.54	0.65	7.05
Georgi Damyanovo	2,771	2,688	3	40	4	7	29	Georgi Damyanovo	97.00	0.10	1.44	0.14	0.25	1.04
Glavinitsa	10,930	2,880	6,701	215	8	44	1,082	Glavinitsa	26.34	61.30	1.96	0.07	0.40	9.89
Godech	5,375	5,162		20			187	Godech	96.03		0.37			3.47
Gorna Malina	6,209	5,575	12	282	15	13	312	Gorna Malina	89.78	0.19	4.54	0.24	0.20	5.02
Gorna Oryahovitsa	46,685	38,642	2,264	626	138	236	4,779	Gorna Oryahovitsa	82.77	4.84	1.34	0.29	0.50	10.23
Gotse Delchev	31,236	20,424	6,820	318	263	315	3,096	Gotse Delchev	65.38	21.83	1.01	0.84	1.00	9.91
Gramada	2,007	1,951	0	25			22	Gramada	97.20	0.00	1.24			1.09
Gulyantsi	12,336	10,116	157	211	24	27	1,801	Gulyantsi	82.00	1.27	1.71	0.19	0.21	14.59
Gurkovo	5,127	3,596	196	1,034	5	29	267	Gurkovo	70.13	3.82	20.16	0.09	0.56	5.20
Galabovo	13,394	12,036	68	769	20	81	420	Galabovo	89.86	0.50	5.74	0.14	0.60	3.13
Garmen	14,981	7,262	1,774	1,386	419	335	3,805	Garmen	48.47	11.84	9.25	2.79	2.23	25.39
Dve Mogili	9,442	5,107	2,519	999	19	16	782	Dve Mogili	54.08	26.67	10.58	0.20	0.16	8.28
Devin	13,013	8,961	1,580	104	61	195	2,112	Devin	68.86	12.14	0.79	0.46	1.49	16.22
Devnya	8,730	6,459	658	525	154	125	809	Devnya	73.98	7.53	6.01	1.76	1.43	9.26
Dzhebel	8,167	1,245	5,432	3	82	569	836	Dzhebel	15.24	66.51	0.03	1.00	6.96	10.23
Dimitrovgrad	53,557	45,393	780	3,370	168	265	3,581	Dimitrovgrad	84.75	1.45	6.29	0.31	0.49	6.68
Dimovo	6,514	5,393	5	816	17	40	243	Dimovo	82.79	0.07	12.52	0.26	0.61	3.73
Dobrich	91,030	73,657	6,795	2,482	528	708	6,860	Dobrich	80.91	7.46	2.72	0.58	0.77	7.53
Dobrich-Selska	22,081	11,475	3,596	4,387	347	409	1,867	Dobrich-Selska	51.96	16.28	19.86	1.57	1.85	8.45
Dolna Banya	4,522	3,499	4	753	15	11	240	Dolna Banya	77.37	0.08	16.65	0.33	0.24	5.30
Dolna Mitropoliya	20,064	15,114	449	1,046	37	89	3,329	Dolna Mitropoliya	75.32	2.23	5.21	0.18	0.44	16.59
Dolni Dabnik	11,670	8,392	564	922	30	88	1,674	Dolni Dabnik	71.91	4.83	7.90	0.25	0.75	14.34
Dolni Chiflik	19,360	11,127	3,298	400	250	240	4,045	Dolni Chiflik	57.47	17.03	2.06	1.29	1.23	20.89
Dospat	9,116	4,469	65	31	309	290	3,952	Dospat	49.02	0.71	0.34	3.38	3.18	43.35
Dragoman	5,362	4,496		9			847	Dragoman	83.84		0.16			15.79
Dryanovo	9,685	8,078	495	261	115	25	711	Dryanovo	83.40	5.11	2.69	1.18	0.25	7.34
Dulovo	28,282	4,694	18,521	2,417	468	210	1,972	Dulovo	16.59	65.48	8.54	1.65	0.74	6.97
Dupnitsa	44,988	39,829	17	2,441	106	121	2,474	Dupnitsa	88.53	0.03	5.42	0.23	0.26	5.49
Dalgopol	14,389	5,755	5,918	685	22	193	1,816	Dalgopol	39.99	41.12	4.76	0.15	1.34	12.62
Elena	9,434	6,753	1,339	574	26	78	664	Elena	71.58	14.19	6.08	0.27	0.82	7.03
Elin Pelin	22,841	18,475	53	554	47	56	3,656	Elin Pelin	80.88	0.23	2.42	0.20	0.24	16.00
Elhovo	16,219	13,433	35	1,211	111	109	1,320	Elhovo	82.82	0.21	7.46	0.68	0.67	8.13
Etropole	12,047	11,285	11	199	29	55	468	Etropole	93.67	0.09	1.65	0.24	0.45	3.88
Zavet	10,586	1,458	6,423	563	16	413	1,713	Zavet	13.77	60.67	5.31	0.15	3.90	16.18
Zemen	2,762	2,655	11	41	4	2	49	Zemen	96.12	0.39	1.48	0.14	0.07	1.77
Zlataritsa	3,991	2,644	600	99	55	63	530	Zlataritsa	64.24	15.03	2.48	1.37	1.57	13.27
Zlatitsa	5,837	5,338	30	169	15	24	261	Zlatitsa	91.45	0.51	2.89	0.25	0.41	4.47
Zlatograd	12,321	9,352	38	0	67	62	2,802	Zlatograd	75.90	0.30	0.00	0.54	0.50	22.74
Ivaylovgrad	6,426	4,739	412	54	37	123	1,061	Ivaylovgrad	73.74	6.41	0.84	0.57	1.91	16.51
Ivanovo	9,429	7,153	1,577	203	72	26	398	Ivanovo	75.86	16.72	2.15	0.76	0.27	4.22
Iskar	6,884	6,516	37	143	20	30	138	Iskar	94.65	0.53	2.07	0.29	0.43	2.00
Isperih	22,692	5,680	13,180	1875	42	137	1,778	Isperih	25.03	58.08	8.26	0.18	0.60	7.83
Ihtiman	17,720	11,998	53	4,130	26	113	1,400	Ihtiman	67.70	0.29	23.30	0.14	0.63	7.90
Kavarna	15,358	10,673	591	2,075	89	326	1,604	Kavarna	69.49	3.84	13.51	0.57	2.12	10.44
Kaynardzha	5,070	1,429	2,552	735	21	17	316	Kaynardzha	28.18	50.33	14.49	0.41	0.33	6.23
Kazanlak	72,581	57,822	4,962	3,738	787	455	4,817	Kazanlak	79.66	6.83	5.15	1.08	0.62	6.63
Kaloyanovo	11,879	10,369	549	742	15	23	181	Kaloyanovo	87.28	4.62	6.24	0.12	0.19	1.52
Kameno	10,393	7,989	327	654	147	83	1,193	Kameno	76.86	3.14	6.29	1.41	0.79	11.47
Kaolinovo	12,093	722	8,964	1,675	12	175	545	Kaolinovo	5.97	74.12	13.85	0.09	1.44	4.50
Karlovo	52,307	39,586	2,696	5,781	269	171	3,804	Karlovo	75.68	5.15	11.05	0.51	0.32	7.27
Karnobat	25,477	19,030	2,125	1,202	289	141	2,690	Karnobat	74.69	8.34	4.71	1.13	0.55	10.55
Kaspichan	7,976	4,935	1,073	925	292	103	648	Kaspichan	61.87	13.45	11.59	3.66	1.29	8.12
Kirkovo	21,916	5,808	10,138	39	253	160	5,518	Kirkovo	26.50	46.25	0.17	1.15	0.73	25.17
Knezha	13,803	11,129	59	948	14	79	1,574	Knezha	80.62	0.42	6.86	0.10	0.57	11.40
Kovachevtsi	1,600	1,569		0	4		25	Kovachevtsi	98.06		0.00	0.25		1.56
Kozloduy	21,180	16,149	31	1,427	66	83	3,424	Kosloduy	76.24	0.14	6.73	0.31	0.39	16.16
Koprivshtitsa	2,410	2,283	3	44	4	4	72	Koprivhstitsa	94.73	0.12	1.82	0.16	0.16	2.98
Kostenets	12,793	11,511	4	468	23	26	761	Kostenets	89.97	0.03	3.65	0.17	0.20	5.94
Kostinbrod	17,846	16,156	22	402	28	39	1,199	Kostinbrod	90.53	0.12	2.25	0.15	0.21	6.71
Kotel	19,391	7,024	5,793	4,790	205	142	1,437	Kotel	36.22	29.87	24.70	1.05	0.73	7.41
Kocherinovo	5,214	4,991	2	105	10	7	99	Kocherinovo	95.72	0.03	2.01	0.19	0.13	1.89
Kresna	5,441	5,137	4	21	18	17	244	Kresna	94.41	0.07	0.38	0.33	0.31	4.48
Krivodol	9,390	7,184	10	1,221	12	37	926	Krivodol	76.50	0.10	13.00	0.12	0.39	9.86
Krichim	8,409	4,652	1,646	564	44	1,279	224	Krichim	55.32	19.57	6.70	0.52	15.20	2.66
Krumovgrad	17,823	3,968	10,161	36	97	223	3,338	Krumovgrad	22.26	57.01	0.20	0.54	1.25	18.72
Krushari	4,547	1,538	1,513	433	8	168	887	Krushari	33.82	33.27	9.52	0.17	3.69	19.50
Kubrat	18,355	6,198	9,283	1,321	79	344	1,130	Kubrat	33.76	50.57	7.19	0.43	1.87	6.15
Kuklen	6,431	3,631	1,750	516	12	98	424	Kuklen	56.46	27.21	8.02	0.18	1.52	6.59
Kula	4,717	4,459		98		12	142	Kula	94.53		2.07		0.25	3.01
Kardzhali	67,460	24,285	33,276	1,013	225	1,155	7,506	Kardzhali	35.99	49.32	1.50	0.33	1.71	11.12
Kyustendil	60,681	52,496	30	5,210	178	315	2,452	Kyustendil	86.51	0.04	8.58	0.29	0.51	4.04
Levski	19,938	14,934	1,199	683	69	99	2,954	Levski	74.90	6.01	3.42	0.34	0.49	14.81
Lesichovo	5,408	4,085	130	809	16	30	338	Lesichovo	75.53	2.40	14.95	0.29	0.55	6.25
Letnitsa	3776	2,630	461	111	164	50	360	Letnitsa	69.65	12.20	2.93	4.34	1.32	9.53
Lovech	49,738	43,223	2,321	665	165	296	3,068	Lovech	86.90	4.66	1.33	0.33	0.59	6.16
Loznitsa	9,265	2,812	4,440	59	190	164	1,600	Loznitsa	30.35	47.92	0.63	2.05	1.77	17.26
Lom	28,139	22,375	50	4,729	66	201	718	Lom	79.51	0.17	16.80	0.23	0.71	2.55
Lukovit	18,125	13,302	516	2,776	56	117	1,358	Lukovit	73.39	2.84	15.31	0.30	0.64	7.49
Laki	2,902	2,572	65	1	5	44	215	Laki	88.62	2.23	0.03	0.17	1.51	7.40
Lyubimets	10,214	8,238	124	1,606	24	28	194	Lyubimets	80.65	1.21	15.72	0.23	0.27	1.89
Lyaskovets	13,397	12,113	307	263	59	46	609	Lyaskovets	90.41	2.29	1.96	0.44	0.34	4.54
Madan	12,276	7,230	661		442		3,703	Madan	58.89	5.38		3.60		30.16
Madzharovo	1,665	873	498	22	4	6	262	Madzharovo	52.43	29.90	1.32	0.24	0.36	15.73
Makresh	1,630	1,545	0	56	0	3	26	Makresh	94.78	0.00	3.43	0.00	0.18	1.59
Malko Tarnovo	3,793	2,902	23	429	16	20	403	Malko Tarnovo	76.50	0.60	11.31	0.42	0.52	10.62
Maritsa	32,438	25,539	897	1,977	58	363	3,604	Maritsa	78.73	2.76	6.09	0.17	1.11	11.11
Medkovets	4,029	3,262	4	635	3	17	108	Medkovets	80.96	0.09	15.76	0.07	0.42	2.68
Mezdra	21,748	19,189	20	622	44	66	1,807	Mezdra	88.23	0.09	2.86	0.20	0.30	8.30
Mizia	7,570	6,765	3	490	14	33	265	Mizia	89.36	0.03	6.47	0.18	0.43	3.50
Mineralni Bani	5,899	2,310	3,032	197	6	25	329	Mineralni Bani	39.15	51.39	3.33	0.10	0.42	5.57
Mirkovo	2,540	2,227	8	152	4	11	138	Mirkovo	87.67	0.31	5.98	0.15	0.43	5.43
Momchilgrad	16,263	1,518	12,049	205	25	414	2,052	Momchilgrad	9.33	74.08	1.26	0.15	2.54	12.61
Montana	53,856	47,464	34	3,764	180	217	2,197	Montana	88.13	0.06	6.98	0.33	0.40	4.07
Maglizh	10,180	6,274	323	2,975	109	52	447	Maglizh	61.63	3.17	29.22	1.07	0.51	4.39
Nevestino	2,821	2,766	2	12	5	4	32	Nevestino	98.05	0.07	0.42	0.17	0.14	1.13
Nedelino	7,221	5,600				24	1,589	Nedelino	77.55				0.33	22.00
Nesebar	22,348	18,367	1,240	565	199	140	1,837	Nesebar	82.18	5.54	2.52	0.89	0.62	8.21
Nikola Koslevo	6,100	1,299	2,883	1,176	115	199	428	Nikola Kozlevo	21.29	47.26	19.27	1.88	3.26	7.01
Nikolaevo	4,346	2,493	464	1,083	8	53	245	Nikolaevo	57.36	10.67	24.91	0.18	1.21	5.63
Nikopol	9,305	5,901	2,152	144	28	42	1,038	Nikopol	63.41	23.12	1.54	0.30	0.45	11.15
Nova Zagora	39,010	27,564	5,495	1,435	152	365	3,999	Nova Zagora	70.65	14.08	3.67	0.38	0.93	10.25
Novi Pazar	16,879	9,872	3,941	1,720	59	112	1,175	Novi Pazar	58.48	23.34	10.19	0.34	0.66	6.96
Novo Selo	2,979	2,834		70	19		49	Novo Selo	95.13		2.34	0.63		1.64
Omurtag	21,853	3,518	11,959	1,690	198	147	4,341	Omurtag	16.09	54.72	7.73	0.90	0.67	19.86
Opaka	6,664	1,433	3,858	4	5	8	1,356	Opaka	21.50	57.89	0.06	0.07	0.12	20.34
Opan	2,950	2,443	7	72	0	5	423	Opan	82.81	0.23	2.44	0.00	0.16	14.33
Oryahovo	11,522	8,707	95	508	22	50	2,140	Oryahovo	75.56	0.82	4.40	0.19	0.43	18.57
Pavel Banya	14,186	7,220	4,451	1,701	73	80	661	Pavel Banya	50.89	31.37	11.99	0.51	0.56	4.65
Pavlikeni	23,869	19,376	1,694	439	149	130	2,081	Pavlikeni	81.17	7.09	1.83	0.62	0.54	8.71
Pazardzhik	114,817	89,787	5,686	10,132	423	847	7,942	Pazardzhik	78.20	4.95	8.82	0.36	0.73	6.91
Panagyurishte	25,263	23,027	11	232	21	294	1,678	Panagyurishte	91.14	0.04	0.91	0.08	1.16	6.64
Pernik	97,181	88,831	176	1,781	208	250	5,935	Pernik	91.40	0.18	1.83	0.21	0.25	6.10
Perushtitsa	5,058	3,358	7	1,552	8	22	111	Perushtitsa	66.38	0.13	30.68	0.15	0.43	2.19
Petrich	54,006	46,337	270	2,769	247	137	4,246	Petrich	85.79	0.49	5.12	0.45	0.25	7.86
Peshtera	18,899	12,340	2,797	749	205	225	2,583	Peshtera	65.29	14.79	3.96	1.08	1.19	13.66
Pirdop	8,293	7,330	65	254	17	18	609	Pirdop	88.38	0.78	3.06	0.20	0.21	7.34
Pleven	131,152	112,414	3,204	4,626	524	564	9,820	Pleven	85.71	2.44	3.52	0.39	0.43	7.48
Plovdiv	338,153	277,804	16,032	9,438	3,105	2,487	29,287	Plovdiv	82.15	4.74	2.79	0.91	0.73	8.66
Polski Trambesh	14,451	10,485	1,385	508	77	131	1,865	Polski Trambesh	72.55	9.58	3.51	0.53	0.90	12.90
Pomorie	27,658	17,992	4,947	1,307	176	101	3,135	Pomorie	65.05	17.88	4.72	0.63	0.36	11.33
Popovo	28,775	18,531	4,556	959	155	631	3,943	Popovo	64.39	15.83	3.33	0.53	2.19	13.70
Pordim	6,426	5,452	377	69	3	41	484	Pordim	84.84	5.86	1.07	0.04	0.63	7.53
Pravets	7,569	5,957	4	1,228	33	20	327	Pravets	78.70	0.05	16.22	0.43	0.26	4.32
Primorsko	6,064	4,268	84	577	37	37	1,061	Primorsko	70.38	1.38	9.51	0.61	0.61	17.49
Provadia	22,934	13,220	2,418	3,381	90	447	3,378	Provadia	57.64	10.54	14.74	0.39	1.94	14.72
Parvomay	25,883	20,552	2,092	1,526	28	114	1,571	Parvomay	79.40	8.08	5.89	0.10	0.44	6.06
Radnevo	20,079	17,430	199	1,202	43	73	1,132	Radnevo	86.80	0.99	5.98	0.21	0.36	5.63
Radomir	20,896	18,487	34	893	30	164	1,288	Radomir	88.47	0.16	4.27	0.14	0.78	6.16
Razgrad	51,095	30,660	14,296	1,549	264	446	3,880	Razgrad	60.00	27.97	3.03	0.51	0.87	7.59
Razlog	20,598	18,694	21	834	64	95	890	Razlog	90.75	0.10	4.04	0.31	0.46	4.32
Rakitovo	15,064	8,234	40	2,373	54	171	4,192	Rakitovo	54.66	0.26	15.75	0.35	1.13	27.82
Rakovski	26,381	21,899	97	1,677	40	53	2,615	Rakovski	83.01	0.36	6.35	0.15	0.20	9.91
Rila	2,888	2,659	2	73	4	9	141	Rila	92.07	0.06	2.52	0.13	0.31	4.88
Rodopi	32,602	22,410	1,325	841	80	165	7,781	Rodopi	68.73	4.06	2.57	0.24	0.50	23.86
Roman	6,223	2,458	8	374	19	24	3,340	Roman	39.49	0.12	6.00	0.30	0.38	53.67
Rudozem	10,069	6,774	41	0	738	122	2,394	Rudozem	67.27	0.40	0.00	7.32	1.21	23.77
Ruzhintsi	4,374	3,494	5	806	9	17	43	Ruzhintsi	79.88	0.11	18.42	0.20	0.38	0.98
Ruen	29,101	1,619	21,241	1,300	10	322	4,609	Ruen	5.56	72.99	4.46	0.01	1.10	15.83
Ruse	167,585	137,337	12,500	1,721	1,195	702	14,130	Ruse	81.95	7.45	1.02	0.71	0.41	8.43
Sadovo	15,604	10,932	397	795	22	60	3,398	Sadovo	70.05	2.54	5.09	0.14	0.38	21.77
Samokov	38,089	29,835	70	5,153	243	965	1,823	Samokov	78.32	0.18	13.52	0.63	2.53	4.78
Samuil	7,005	769	5,337	346	98	42	413	Samuil	10.97	76.18	4.93	1.39	0.59	5.89
Sandanski	40,470	35,771	245	596	187	332	3,339	Sandanksi	88.38	0.60	1.47	0.46	0.82	8.25
Sapareva Banya	7,528	7,114	1	161	9	7	236	Sapareva Banya	94.50	0.01	2.13	0.11	0.09	3.13
Satovcha	15,444	7,200	783	251	376	339	6,495	Satovcha	46.62	5.06	1.62	2.43	2.19	42.05
Svilengrad	23,004	19,069	316	1,700	62	70	1,787	Svilengrad	82.89	1.37	7.39	0.26	0.30	7.76
Svishtov	42,734	34,855	2,233	238	125	145	5,138	Svishtov	81.56	5.22	0.55	0.29	0.33	12.02
Svoge	22,363	21,526	13	89	36	29	670	Svoge	96.25	0.05	0.39	0.16	0.12	2.99
Sevlievo	35,995	27,045	5,405	618	152	379	2,396	Sevlievo	75.13	15.01	1.71	0.42	1.05	6.65
Septemvri	25,794	19,734	841	2,646	43	84	2,446	Septemvri	76.50	3.26	10.25	0.16	0.32	9.48
Silistra	51,386	40,707	6,258	899	284	230	3,008	Silistra	79.21	12.17	1.74	0.55	0.44	5.85
Simeonovgrad	8,755	6,194	51	1,480	13	47	970	Simeonovgrad	70.74	0.58	16.90	0.14	0.53	11.07
Simitli	14,283	10,691	11	503	47	31	3,000	Simitli	74.85	0.07	3.52	0.32	0.21	21.00
Sitovo	5,396	2,423	1,925	360	144	12	532	Sitovo	44.90	35.67	6.67	2.66	0.22	9.85
Sliven	125,268	88,750	4,209	12,153	1,515	649	17,992	Sliven	70.84	3.35	9.70	1.20	0.51	14.36
Slivnitsa	9,681	9,000	6	154	16	18	487	Slivnitsa	92.96	0.06	1.59	0.16	0.19	5.03
Slivo Pole	10,855	4,731	3,838	1,102	176	111	897	Slivo Pole	43.58	35.35	10.15	1.62	1.02	8.26
Smolyan	41,452	32,708	170	301	161	298	7,814	Smolyan	78.90	0.41	0.72	0.38	0.71	18.85
Smyadovo	6,698	3,993	1,603	400	49	30	623	Smyadovo	59.61	23.93	5.97	0.73	0.44	9.30
Sozopol	12,610	8,889	523	1,678	88	24	1,408	Sozopol	70.49	4.14	13.30	0.69	0.19	11.16
Sopot	9,827	8,377	190	187	108	37	928	Sopot	85.24	1.93	1.90	1.09	0.37	9.44
Sofia	1,291,591	1,136,433	6,526	18,284	9,848	7,240	113,260	Sofia	87.98	0.50	1.41	0.76	0.56	8.76
Sredets	14,934	10,912	230	2,063	68	47	1,614	Sredets	73.06	1.54	13.81	0.45	0.31	10.80
Stamboliyski	20,771	17,739	386	1,620	45	190	791	Stamboliyski	85.40	1.85	7.79	0.21	0.91	3.80
Stambolovo	5,934	1,320	3,931	474	9	8	192	Stambolovo	22.24	66.24	7.98	0.15	0.13	3.23
Stara Zagora	160,108	133,619	2,841	8,531	624	705	13,788	Stara Zagora	83.45	1.77	5.32	0.38	0.44	8.61
Strazhitsa	12,721	9,124	1,758	456	159	657	567	Strazhitsa	71.72	13.81	3.58	1.24	5.16	4.45
Straldzha	12,781	9,866	241	2,403	68	84	119	Straldzha	77.19	1.88	18.80	0.53	0.65	0.93
Strelcha	4,913	3,638	6	287	11	10	961	Strelcha	74.04	0.12	5.84	0.22	0.20	19.56
Strumyani	5,778	4,399	9	124	90	8	1,148	Strumyani	76.13	0.15	2.14	1.55	0.13	19.86
Suvorovo	7,225	3,805	1,288	316	77	312	1,427	Suvorovo	52.66	17.82	4.37	1.06	4.31	19.75
Sungurlare	12,559	6,193	3,553	929	76	122	1,686	Sungurlare	49.31	28.29	7.39	0.60	0.97	13.42
Suhindol	2,542	1,791	448	77	7	111	108	Suhindol	70.45	17.62	3.02	0.27	4.36	4.24
Saedinenie	10,450	8,678	183	787	14	20	768	Saedinenie	83.04	1.75	7.53	0.13	0.19	7.34
Tvarditsa	13,804	9,359	1,287	2,100	82	137	839	Tvarditsa	67.79	9.32	15.21	0.59	0.99	6.07
Tervel	16,178	5,996	6,569	1,799	30	152	1,632	Tervel	37.06	40.60	11.12	0.18	0.93	10.08
Teteven	21,307	18,527	30	661	422	228	1,439	Teteven	86.95	0.14	3.10	1.98	1.07	6.75
Topolovgrad	11,681	10,049	27	982	41	30	552	Topolovgrad	86.02	0.23	8.40	0.35	0.25	4.72
Treklyano	629	613	0	12	1	1	2	Treklyano	97.45	0.00	1.90	0.15	0.15	0.31
Troyan	32,399	27,566	860	334	70	110	3,459	Troyan	85.08	2.65	1.03	0.21	0.33	10.67
Tran	4,146	2,977	2	656	2	14	495	Tran	71.80	0.04	15.82	0.04	0.33	11.93
Tryavna	11,754	11,076	60	59	42	76	441	Tryavna	94.23	0.51	0.50	0.35	0.64	3.75
Tundzha	24,155	20,374	106	1,990	157	173	1,355	Tundzha	84.34	0.43	8.23	0.64	0.71	5.60
Tutrakan	15,374	9,716	3,862	742	41	84	929	Tutrakan	63.19	25.12	4.82	0.26	0.54	6.04
Targovishte	57,264	33,229	14,883	3,902	594	602	4,054	Targovishte	58.02	25.99	6.81	1.03	1.05	7.07
Ugarchin	6,505	5,291	107	234	15	43	815	Ugarchin	81.33	1.64	3.59	0.23	0.66	12.52
Hadzhidimovo	10,091	6,763	615	263	219	101	2,130	Hadzhidimovo	67.02	6.09	2.60	2.17	1.00	21.10
Hayredin	5,001	3,941	7	322	4	4	723	Hayredin	78.80	0.13	6.43	0.07	0.07	14.45
Harmanli	24 947	18 393	2383	2145	67	129	1830	Harmanli	73.72	9.55	8.59	0.26	0.51	7.33
Haskovo	94,156	63,963	16,890	3,859	460	886	8,098	Haskovo	67.93	17.93	4.09	0.48	0.94	8.60
Hisarya	12,600	11,268	83	471	13	28	737	Hisarya	89.42	0.65	3.73	0.10	0.22	5.84
Hitrino	6,223	867	4,853	26	10	24	443	Hitrino	13.93	77.98	0.41	0.16	0.38	7.11
Tsar Kaloyan	6,192	1,652	4,302	6	13	18	201	Tsar Kaloyan	26.67	69.47	0.09	0.20	0.29	3.24
Tsarevo	9,291	6,737	31	748	42	18	1,715	Tsarevo	72.51	0.33	8.05	0.45	0.19	18.45
Tsenovo	5,923	4,669	444	177	6	11	616	Tsenovo	78.82	7.49	2.98	0.10	0.18	10.40
Chavdar	1,272	1,172		43			53	Chavdar	92.13		3.38			4.16
Chelopech	1,473	1,224	6	48			185	Chelopech	83.09	0.40	3.25			12.55
Chepelare	7,720	6,466	10	3	16	74	1,151	Chepelare	83.75	0.12	0.03	0.20	0.95	14.90
Cherven Bryag	27,856	22,247	176	1,077	54	110	4,192	Cherven Bryag	79.86	0.63	3.86	0.19	0.39	15.04
Chernoochene	9,607	207	8,886	0	5	52	457	Chernoochene	2.15	92.49	0.00	0.05	0.54	4.75
Chiprovtsi	3,715	3,612	0	23	12	11	57	Chiprovtsi	97.22	0.00	0.61	0.32	0.29	1.53
Chirpan	21,637	16,516	790	1,774	36	154	2,367	Chirpan	76.33	3.65	8.19	0.16	0.71	10.93
Chuprene	2,083	1,573		300			207	Chuprene	75.51		14.40			9.93
Shabla	5,069	4,466	67	142	24	107	263	Shabla	88.10	1.32	2.80	0.47	2.11	5.18
Shumen	93,649	68,781	13,179	4,042	721	654	6,272	Shumen	73.44	14.07	4.31	0.76	0.69	6.69
Yablanitsa	6,234	4,618	26	916	15	36	623	Yablanitsa	74.07	0.41	14.69	0.24	0.57	9.99
Yakimovo	4,332	3,544	14	681	12	18	63	Yakimovo	81.80	0.32	15.72	0.27	0.41	1.45
Yakoruda	10,731	3,364	4,120	425	198	248	2,376	Yakoruda	31.34	38.39	3.96	1.84	2.31	22.14
Yambol	74,132	59,899	3,185	4,263	296	1,101	5,388	Yambol	80.80	4.29	5.75	0.39	1.48	7.26

=== Native language ===
Population distribution by ethnic group and native language as of February 1, 2011 (people who answered both questions are shown):

Ethnic group	Total	Native language														Doesn't define themselves
Ethnic group	Total	Bulgarian	Turkish	Romani	Russian	Armenian	Romanian	Greek	Aromanian	Ukrainian	Macedonian	Tatar	Arabic	Hebrew	Other	Doesn't define themselves
Total	6,611,513	5,631,759	604,246	280,979	15,211	5,567	5,454	3,182	1,815	1,691	1,376	1,367	1,321	141	9,946	47,458
Bulgarians	5,604,300	5,571,049	15,959	7,528	4,113	270	733	375	316	296	151	5	115	11	1,126	2,253
Turks	585,024	18,975	564,858	549	15		4		0	0		8	4	0	52	555
Romanis	320,761	24,033	21,440	272,710	17	3	1,837		4		5	0			32	673
Russians	9,868	183	8	0	9,556				0	24	0	16	0	0	60	16
Armenians	6,360	1,047		0	37	5,235			0	0	0	0	3	0	14	20
Aromanians	3,598	165	0		0	0	1,964	0	1,462		0	0	0	0	4	
Karakachani	2,511	465	0		0	0	0	1,479	0	0	0	0	0	0	549	17
Ukrainians	1,763	33	0		428	0	0	0	0	1,279	0	0	0	0	18	3
Macedonians	1,609	411		0		0	0		0	0	1,163	0	0	0	13	17
Greeks	1,356	98		0	4	0	0	1,237	0	0	0	0	0	0	14	
Jews	1,130	897			61	0	0	0	0			0	3	120	39	5
Romanians	866	37	0			0	822	0	3	0	0	0	0	0		0
Others	19,260	7,390	383	19	430	30	53	45	24	18	13	1,335	1,103		7,520	895
Doesn't define themselves	53,107	6,976	1,592	166	548	27	38	38	6	71	41	3	91	6	503	43,001

=== Religion ===
Number and percentage of the population by religion, by district:

District	Population									District	Percentage							
District	Total	Eastern Orthoxy	Catholicism	Protestantism	Islam	Others	No religion	Doesn't define themselves	Not shown	District	Eastern Orthodoxy	Catholicism	Protestantism	Islam	Others	No religion	Doesn't define themselves	Not shown
Bulgaria	7,364,570	4,374,135	48,945	64,476	577,139	11,444	272,264	409,898	1,606,269	100.00	59.39	0.66	0.87	7.83	0.15	3.69	5.56	21.81
Blagoevgrad	323,552	196,942	719	1,499	40,667	360	4,639	8,374	70,352	Blagoevgrad	60.86	0.22	0.46	12.56	0.11	1.43	2.58	21.74
Buras	415,817	229,985	1,402	3,882	40,055	513	14,349	20,029	105,602	Buras	55.30	0.33	0.93	9.63	0.12	3.45	4.81	25.39
Varna	475,074	283,143	1,569	2,849	20,533	1,145	20,049	29,921	115,865	Варна	59.59	0.33	0.59	4.32	0.24	4.22	6.29	24.38
Veliko Tarnovo	258,494	160,705	3,276	1,337	11,908	326	10,126	14,346	56,470	Veliko Tarnovo	62.16	1.26	0.51	4.60	0.12	3.91	5.54	21.84
Vidin	101,018	70,224	272	809	74	92	6,474	5,490	17,583	Vidin	69.51	0.26	0.80	0.07	0.09	6.40	5.43	17.40
Vratsa	186,848	106,989	1,258	572	438	120	10,625	10,806	56,040	Vratsa	57.25	0.67	0.30	0.23	0.06	5.68	5.78	29.99
Gabrovo	122,702	83,955	516	686	4,210	131	3,944	6,527	22,733	Gabrovo	68.42	0.42	0.55	3.43	0.10	3.21	5.31	18.52
Dobrich	189,677	103,209	650	936	23,487	216	6,644	13,054	41,481	Dobrich	54.41	0.34	0.49	12.38	0.11	3.50	6.88	21.86
Kardzhali	152,808	23,916	263	223	82,227	77	1,726	8,800	35,576	Kardzhali	15.65	0.17	0.14	53.81	0.05	1.12	5.75	23.28
Kyustendil	136,686	101,506	287	2,713	102	204	3,826	7,306	20,742	Kyustendil	74.26	0.20	1.98	0.07	0.14	2.79	5.34	15.17
Lovech	141,422	84,508	758	1,295	3,273	114	9,454	10,783	31,237	Lovech	59.75	0.53	0.91	2.31	0.08	6.68	7.62	22.08
Montana	148,098	100,571	438	2,740	97	164	14,842	17,323	11,923	Montana	67.90	0.29	1.85	0.06	0.11	10.02	11.69	8.05
Pazardzhik	275,548	161,157	828	3,183	24,353	242	7,443	14,214	64,128	Pazardzhik	58.48	0.30	1.15	8.83	0.08	2.70	5.15	23.27
Pernik	133,530	90,367	403	858	202	146	5,406	8,712	27,436	Pernik	67.67	0.30	0.64	0.15	0.10	4.04	6.52	20.54
Pleven	269,752	153,050	5,164	1,374	4,780	226	16,014	14,311	74,833	Pleven	56.73	1.91	0.50	1.77	0.08	5.93	5.30	27.74
Plovdiv	683,027	428,078	19,502	6,183	36,319	1,087	12,528	31,575	147,755	Plovdiv	62.67	2.85	0.90	5.31	0.15	1.83	4.62	21.63
Razgrad	125,190	41,116	191	379	52,706	63	2,002	7,647	21,086	Razgrad	32.84	0.15	0.30	42.10	0.05	1.59	6.10	16.84
Ruse	235,252	144,073	979	1,435	23,817	455	8,383	12,966	43,144	Ruse	61.24	0.41	0.60	10.12	0.19	3.56	5.51	18.33
Silistra	119,474	51,793	301	527	37,806	140	3,581	6,130	19,196	Silistra	43.35	0.25	0.44	31.64	0.11	2.99	5.13	16.06
Sliven	197,473	100,523	669	5,623	11,471	211	11,516	9,976	57,484	Sliven	50.90	0.33	2.84	5.80	0.10	5.83	5.05	29.10
Smolyan	121,752	28,294	148	192	29 001	67	4,013	11,212	48,825	Smolyan	23.23	0.12	0.15	23.81	0.05	3.29	9.20	40.10
Sofia City	1,291,591	892,511	5,572	10,256	6767	4,010	51,026	65,034	256,415	Sofia City	69.10	0.43	0.79	0.52	0.31	3.95	5.03	19.85
Sofia	247,489	167,620	648	2,979	503	238	6,423	13,699	55,379	Sofia	67.72	0.26	1.20	0.20	0.09	2.59	5.53	22.37
Stara Zagora	333,265	210,440	1,028	5,476	11 693	321	14,023	22,263	68,021	Stara Zagora	63.14	0.30	1.64	3.50	0.09	4.20	6.68	20.41
Targovishte	120,818	45,963	274	261	34 368	78	2,422	6,766	30,686	Targovishte	38.04	0.22	0.21	28.44	0.06	2.00	5.60	25.39
Haskovo	246,238	152,392	747	1,538	23 314	324	6,761	11,138	50,024	Haskovo	61.88	0.30	0.62	9.46	0.13	2.74	4.52	20.31
Shumen	180,528	83,930	565	1,673	51 817	219	4,466	10,270	27,588	Shumen	46.49	0.31	0.92	28.70	0.12	2.47	5.68	15.28
Yambol	131,447	77,175	518	2,998	1151	155	9,559	11,226	28,665	Yambol	58.71	0.39	2.28	0.87	0.11	7.27	8.54	21.80

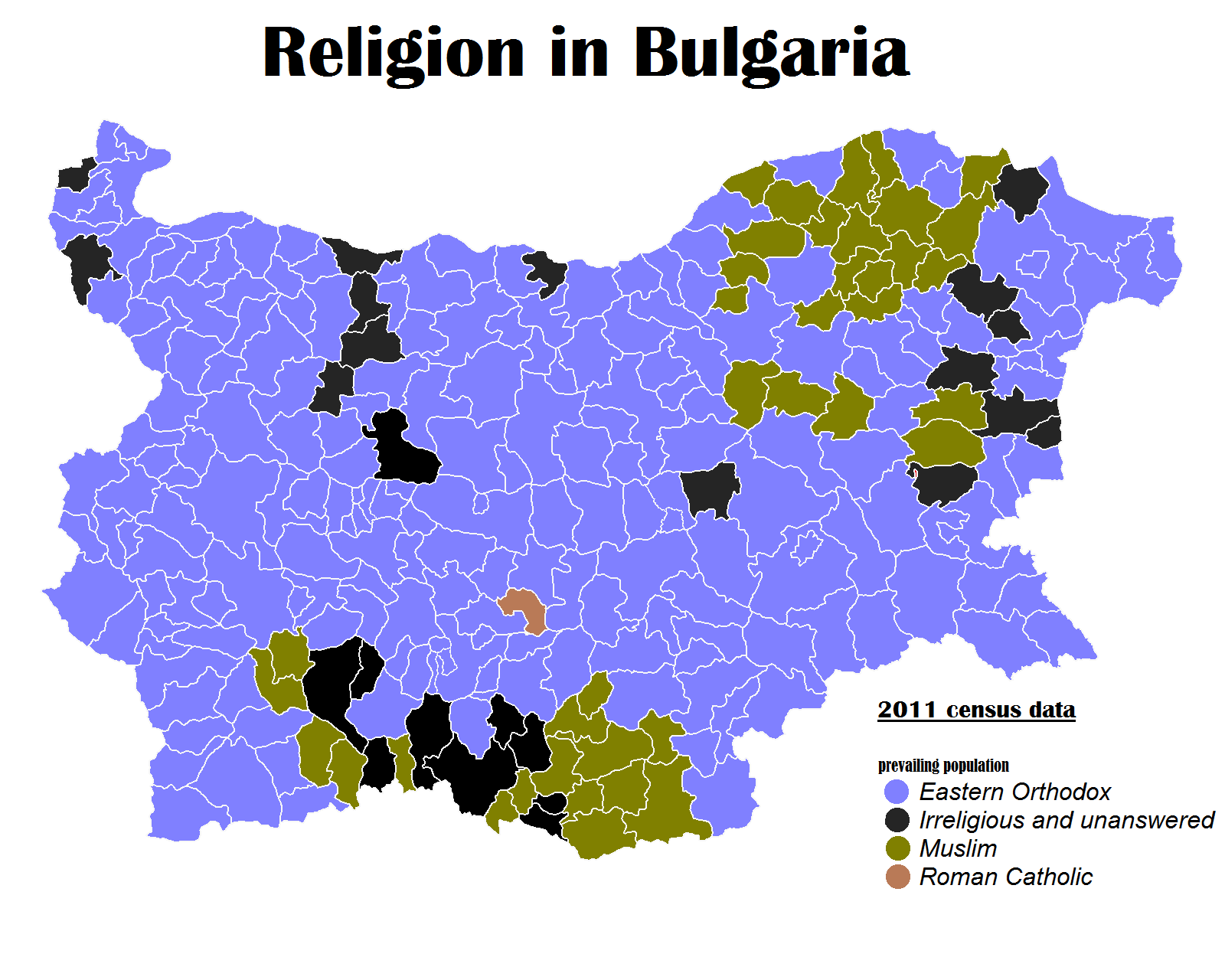
Religion, by district.

== See also ==
- Demographics of Bulgaria
