= Ivaylovgrad Dam =

Dam in Bulgaria

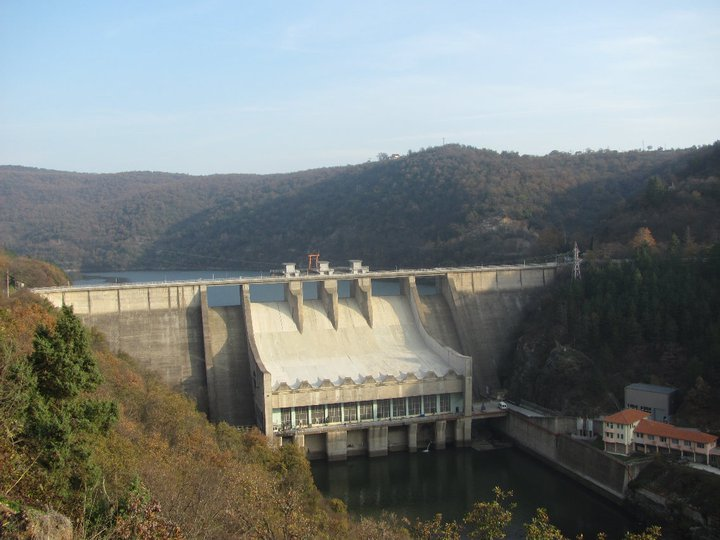
- Ivaylovgrad Dam

- Location within Bulgaria
- Interactive map of Ivaylovgrad Dam
- Location: 13 km north-west of Ivaylovgrad / Haskovo Province, Bulgaria
- Coordinates: 41°32′2″N 26°6′27″E
- Construction began: 1959
- Opening date: 1964
- Owner: NEK EAD
- Operator: NEK EAD

Dam and spillways
- Type of dam: Concrete gravity dam
- Impounds: Arda River
- Height: 73 m (240 ft)
- Length: 250 m (820 ft)
- Spillway type: fixed-crest, overflow spillway at two levels
- Spillway capacity: 5,250 m^{3}/s (185,000 cu ft/s)

Reservoir
- Creates: Ivaylovgrad Reservoir
- Total capacity: 157,000,000 m^{3} (127,000 acre⋅ft)
- Catchment area: 5,128 km^{2} (1,980 sq mi)
- Surface area: 15.2 km^{2} (5.9 sq mi)

Power Station
- Operator: NEK EAD
- Hydraulic head: 52 m (171 ft) (Max)
- Turbines: 4 x Francis-type
- Installed capacity: 104 MW
- Annual generation: 195 GWh

The Ivaylovgrad Dam(язовир "Ивайловград") is located in the eastern Rhodope Mountains and is situated on the Arda river, Southern Bulgaria. There are another two large dams of the Arda upstream - Kardzhali Dam and Studen Kladenets Dam to the west of Ivaylovgrad Dam.

The dam creates Ivaylovgrad reservoir, which has a total volume of 157,000,000 m^{3} (127,000 acre⋅ft) and a drainage basin of 5,128 km^{2} (1,980 sq mi). It is situated at an average 120 m above sea level, its dam being 250 m (820 ft) long and 73 m (240 ft) high. The top of the dam consists of six spillways, totaling 83.5 m (274 ft) m in length.

Ivaylovgrad Reservoir is an attractive place for tourists and fishermen, where rudd is caught in great numbers.

== Hydroelectric generation ==
Arda Hydro Power Cascade consist of three large hydro power sites, mainly used for electricity generation, with a total installed capacity of 331 MW and a total annual output of over 520 GWh. Ivaylovgrad hydroelectric power plant (HPP) is the last stage of the Arda cascade. The initial plans for the construction of a dam on the Arda date to as early as 1948. Construction began in 1959 and was completed in 1964, with the HPP starting production the same year. "Ivaylovgrad" Hydroelectric Power Plant is built-in inside the dam. The HPP has four Francis-type turbines, 26 MW each with a mean annual generation of 195 GWh/y.
