= Ivaylovgrad Reservoir =

Reservoir in Haskovo Province, Bulgaria

Ivaylovgrad Dam
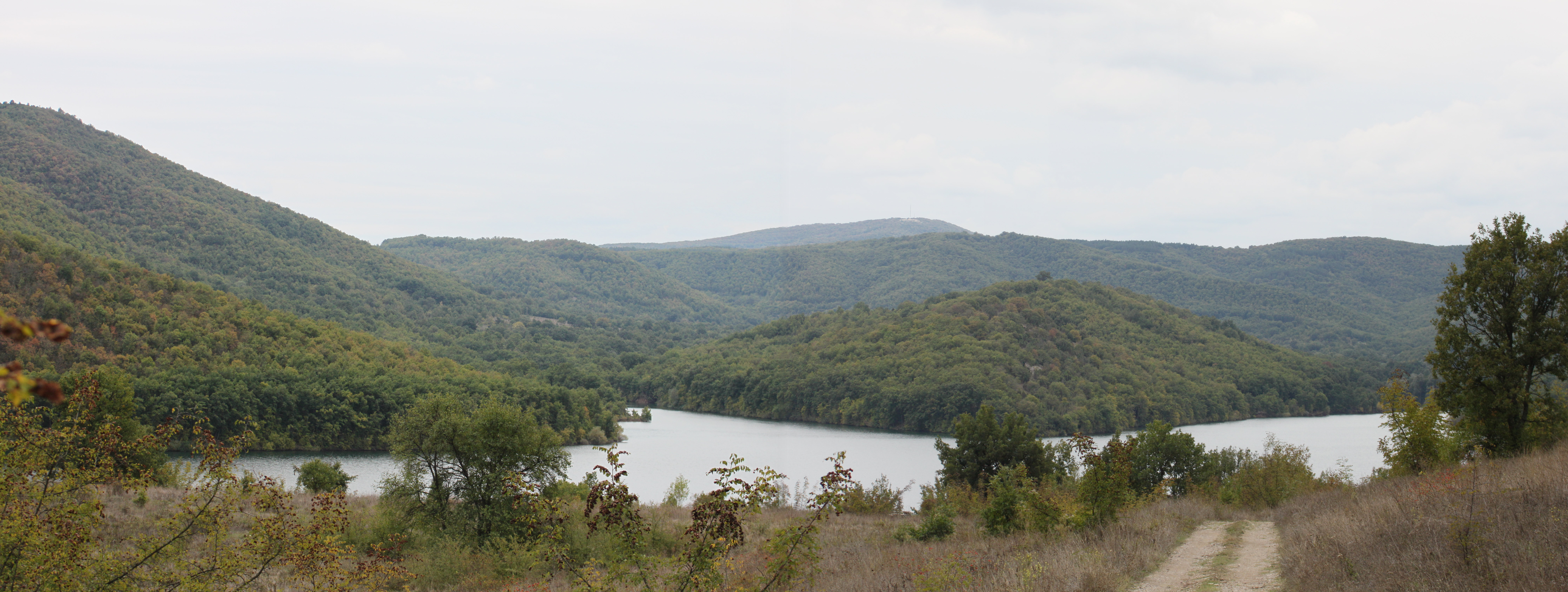

- Location of Ivaylovgrad Reservoir in Bulgaria
- Interactive map of Ivaylovgrad Dam
- Official name: Язовир Ивайловград (Bulgarian)
- Location: Ivaylovgrad, eastern Rhodope Mountains
- Coordinates: 41°37′46.56″N 25°58′21.72″E
- Construction began: 1959
- Opening date: 1964

Dam and spillways
- Type of dam: concrete gravity dam
- Height: 73 m (240 ft)
- Length: 365 m (1,198 ft)

Reservoir
- Creates: Ivaylovgrad Reservoir
- Total capacity: 156,700,000 m^{3} (127,000 acre⋅ft)
- Catchment area: 5,128 km^{2} (1,980 mi^{2})
- Surface area: 15.1 km^{2} (3,700 acres)

Power Station
- Operator: NEK EAD
- Installed capacity: 104 MW
- Annual generation: 196 GWh

Ivaylovgrad Reservoir (Bulgarian: язовир Ивайловград) is located on the river Arda in the eastern Rhodope Mountains of southern Bulgaria. It was constructed to provide electricity generation and irrigation as a major part of the Arda Hydropower Cascade along the reservoirs of Studen Kladenets and Kardzhali further upstream.

== Geography ==
The reservoir lies in the municipalities of Madzharovo, Lyubimets and Ivaylovgrad of Haskovo Province. Its dam is situated north of the homonymous town and a few kilometers upstream from the Bulgaria–Greece border. Ivaylovgrad Reservoir is located in the eastern reaches of the Rhodope Mountains on the major river Arda, a right tributary of the Maritsa. Its shoreline is 64 km long and is mostly covered with dense deciduous forests. The territory around the reservoir has been designated an Important Bird Area by BirdLife International and supports 163 bird species, including breeding populations of European importance of white-tailed eagle, booted eagle and osprey.

== Dam ==
Ivaylovgrad Reservoir was constructed in 1959–1964. Four villages were submerged by its waters. It was initially considered as a much larger structure, capable of damming over 1 billion m^{3}, but that option was not chosen, as it would have flooded the then operative Madzharovo mines upstream. Another option to expand the reservoir and to construct a nuclear power plant was also considered later, but was not realized to the military vulnerability of the region, situated close to the borders with Greece and Turkey.

It has a concrete gravity dam, situated in the easternmost part of the artificial lake, with a height of 73 m and a length of 365 m. The dam wall is traversed by the third class III-597 road. The main spillway has a capacity of 270 m^{3}/s. The reservoir covers a territory of 15.1 km^{2} and a catchment area of 5,126 km^{2}. The projected volume is 188 million m^{3} but due to sediment accumulation it has been reduced to 156.7 million m^{3}. The Ivaylovgrad Hydropower Plant with a capacity of 104 MW is built into the wall, below the spillway overflow. It is also utilized to control the floods of the Arda.

== Gallery ==
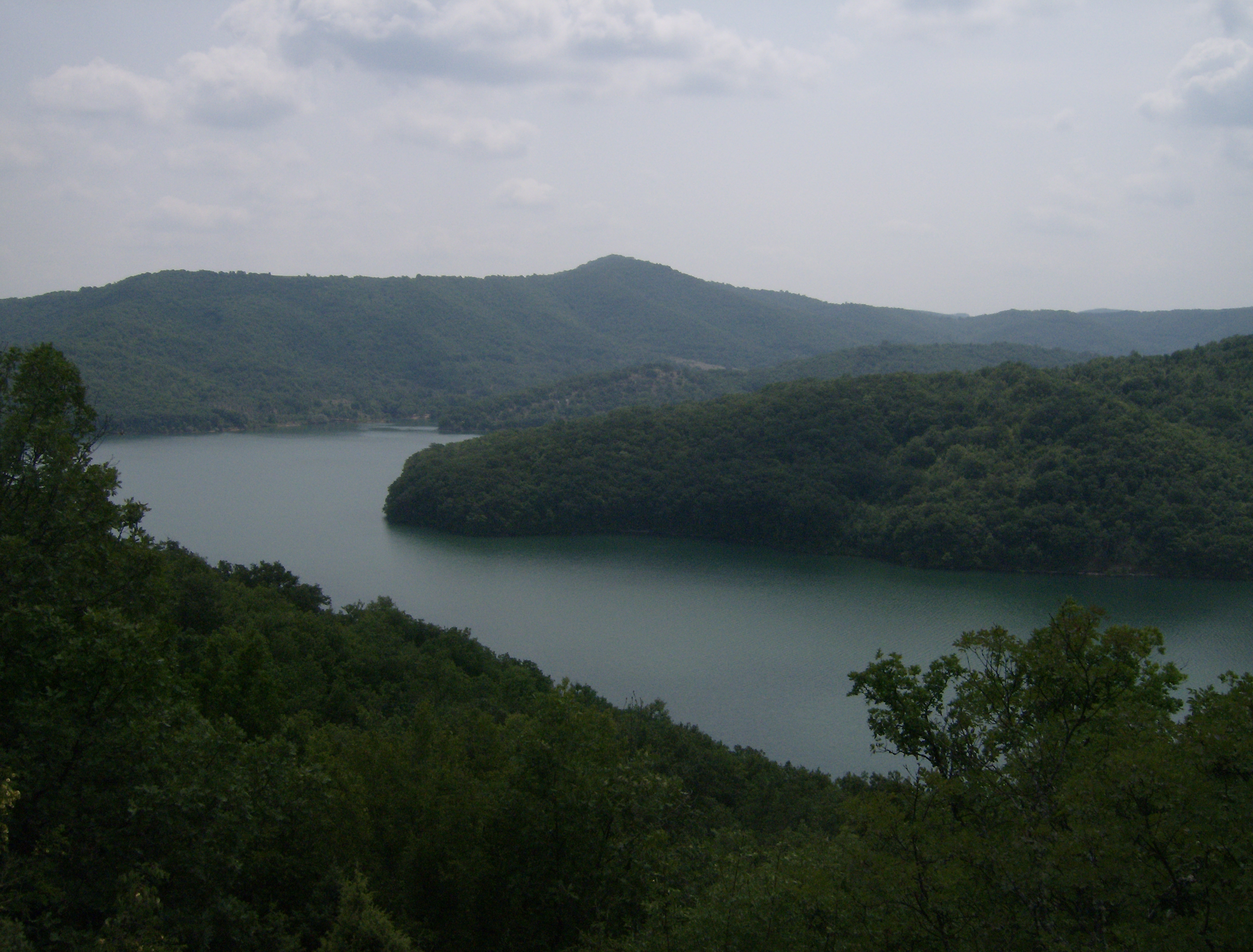
A view of the reservoir

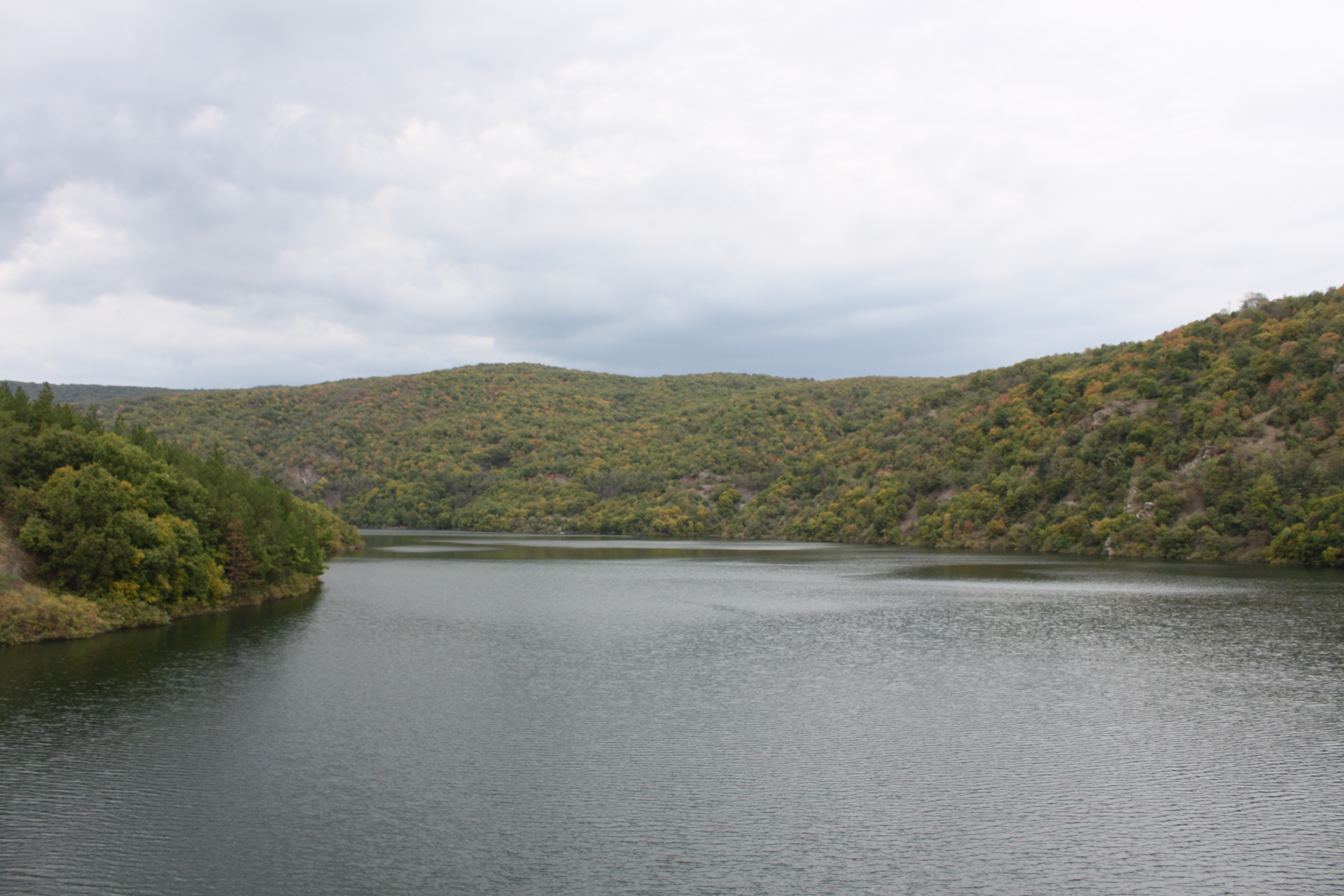
A view of the reservoir

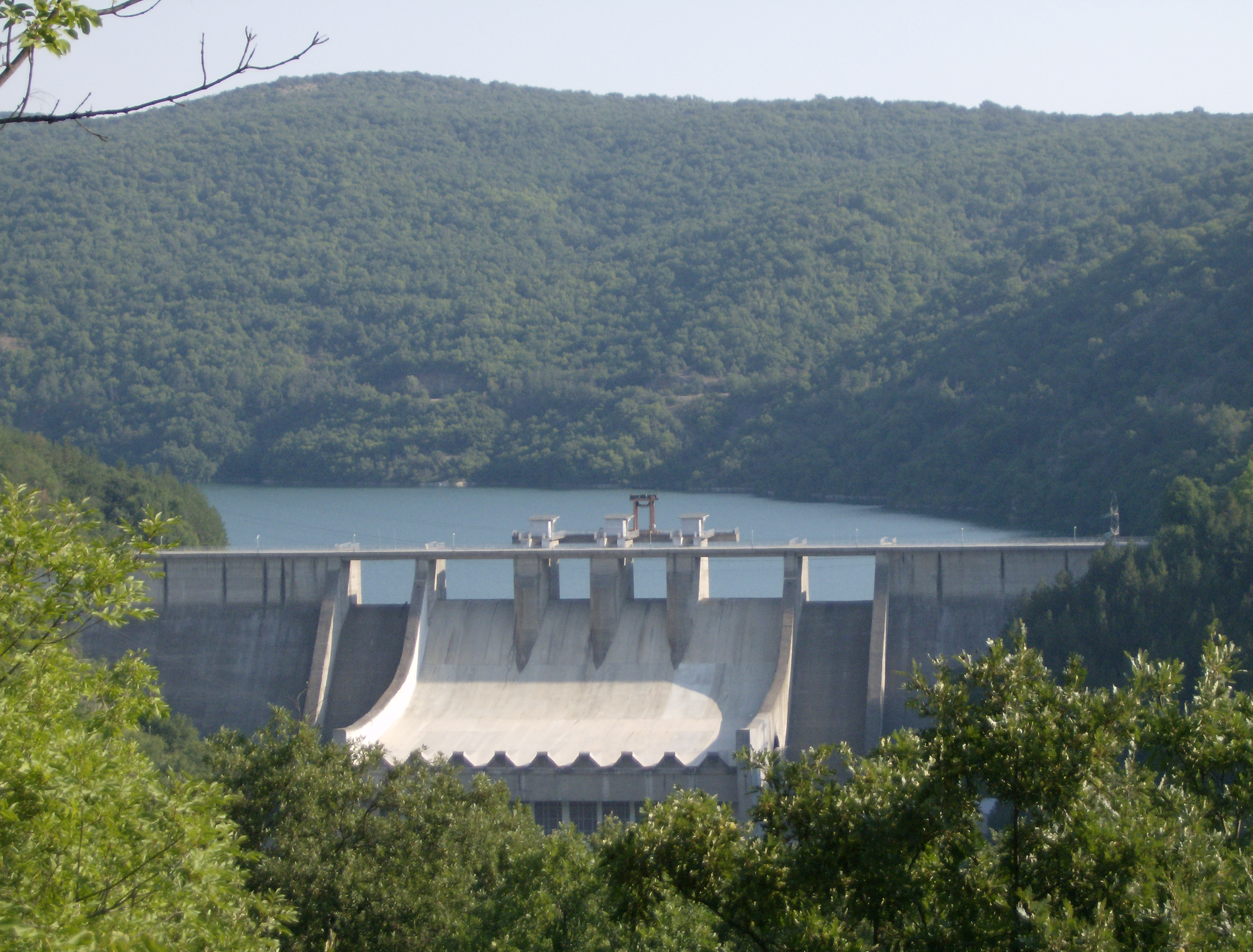
The dam

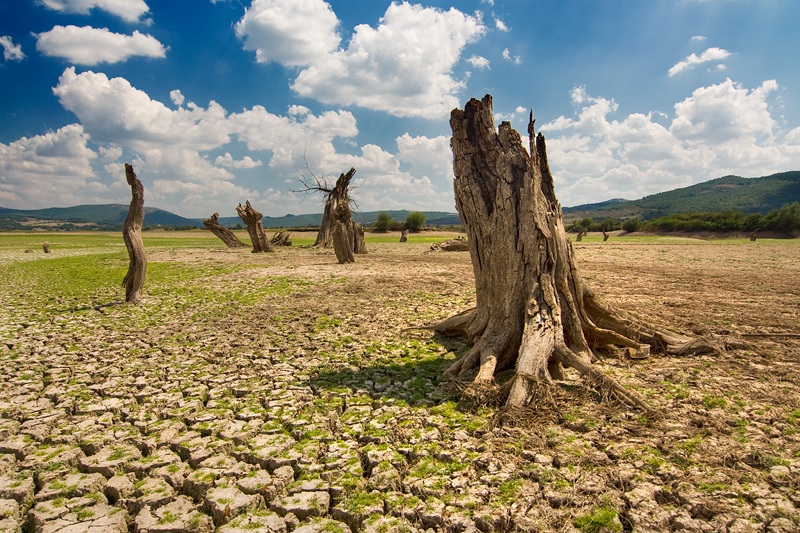
The upper part in drought
