= Cherven Bryag Municipality =

Cherven Bryag Municipality Община Червен бряг
- Municipality
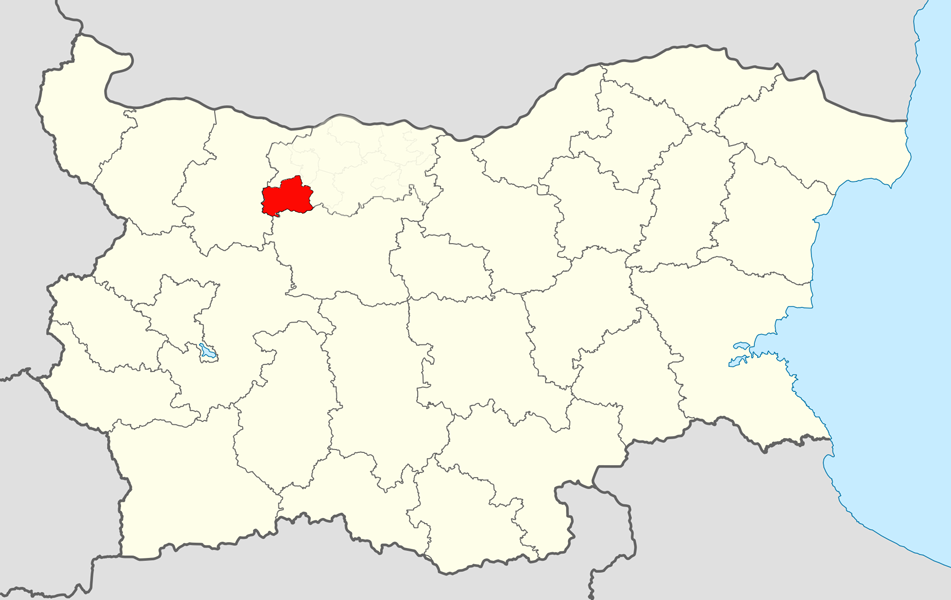
- Cherven Bryag Municipality within Bulgaria and Pleven Province.
- Coordinates: 43°17′N 24°9′E
- Country: Bulgaria
- Province (Oblast): Pleven
- Admin. centre (Obshtinski tsentar): Cherven Bryag

Area
  - Total: 584 km^{2} (225 sq mi)

Population (December 2009)
  - Total: 30,524
  - Density: 52.3/km^{2} (135/sq mi)
- Time zone: UTC+2 (EET)
  - Summer (DST): UTC+3 (EEST)

Cherven Bryag Municipality (Bulgarian: Община Червен бряг) is a municipality (obshtina) in Pleven Province, northwestern Bulgaria. It is named after its administrative centre - the town of Cherven Bryag. With a population of 30,524, as of December 2009, it is the second largest municipality in the province.

The municipality is located by the right side of the Iskar River, close to the inlet of Zlatna Panega River. It has area of 584 km^{2} (225 sq mi).

It borders with Lukovit, Roman, Dolni Dabnik, Iskar, Knezha and Byala Slatina municipalities. The Sofia - Rousse highway and Sofia-Varna railroad pass through municipality.

The municipality has 37 protected areas, including Kuklite ("The Dolls") rock formations on the lands of Resselets village; Kaleto tectonic ridge on the lands of Reselets village; Skoka waterfall on the lands of Reselets; Haydoushka cave near Deventsi; Sedlarkata Rock Bridge on the lands of Rakita; Neolithic settlements near Telish, Thracian settlements in Chomakovtsi, Roman cites near Resselets and Chomakovtsi.

== Settlements ==
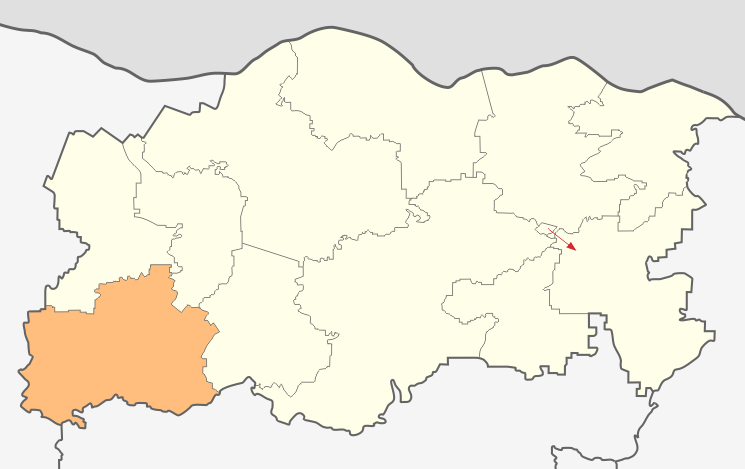
Cherven Bryag Municipality within Pleven Province

Settlement	Cyrillic	Postal code	Status	Population (December 2009)
Breste	Бресте	5992	village	440
Glava	Глава	5985	village	1,397
Gornik	Горник	5991	village	1,250
Deventsi	Девенци	5995	village	775
Koynare	Койнаре	5986	town	4,464
Lepitsa	Лепица	5987	village	458
Radomirtsi	Радомирци	5997	village	1,523
Rakita	Ракита	5998	village	938
Reselets	Реселец	5993	village	1,061
Ruptsi	Рупци	5994	village	1,237
Suhache	Сухаче	5988	village	751
Telish	Телиш	5990	village	1,166
Cherven Bryag	Червен бряг	5980	town, capital	13,856
Chomakovtsi	Чомаковци	5989	village	1208
			total	30,524

== Demography ==
The following table shows the change of the population during the last four decades.

Cherven Bryag Municipality
Year	1975	1985	1992	2001	2005	2007	2009	2011
Population	45,044	43,088	40,876	35,562	32,157	31,281	30,524	...
Sources: Census 2001, Census 2011, „pop-stat.mashke.org“,

=== Religion ===
According to the latest Bulgarian census of 2011, the religious composition, among those who answered the optional question on religious identification, was the following:

Religious composition of Cherven Bryag Municipality
Orthodox Christianity	79.7%
Catholicism	0.6%
Protestantism	1.4%
Islam	0.6%
No religion	9.3%
Prefer not to answer, others and indefinable	8.4%

== See also ==
- Provinces of Bulgaria
- Municipalities of Bulgaria
- List of cities and towns in Bulgaria
