= Ilia Beshkov =

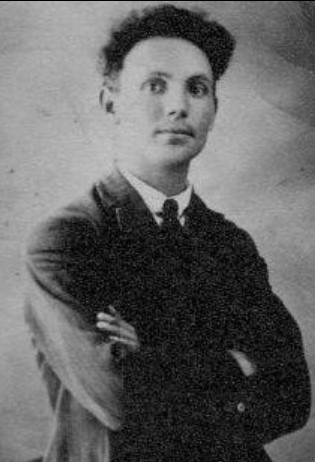
- Beshkov in 1920s
- Born: 24 July 1901; Dolni Dabnik, Bulgaria
- Died: 23 January 1958; Sofia, Bulgaria
- Known for: Artist

Ilia Beshkov Dunov (Bulgarian: Илия Бешков Дунов; 24 July 1901 – 23 January 1958) was a Bulgarian painter, graphic artist, comics artist, caricaturist, cartoonist, illustrator, writer and pedagogue.

== Life ==
Beshkov was born in 1901 in Dolni Dabnik, nowadays a small town near Pleven in Pleven Province, central northern Bulgaria. In 1918–1920, he studied at the Faculty of Law of Sofia University and briefly returned to his native Dolni Dabnik as a teacher. In 1921, he enrolled in painting at the National Academy of Art, in the class of prof. Nikola Marinov. He graduated in 1926.

As a student, Beshkov published caricatures in the Maskarad, Div Dyado, Balgaran, Starshel and Vik magazines and illustrated the issues of the T. F. Chipev and Hemus printing houses. From 1925 on, he co-operated with the Pladne magazine among others. He was twice arrested due to his leftist political views: once after participating in the June Uprising following the Bulgarian coup d'état of 1923 and then during the 1925 April Events in the wake of the St Nedelya Church assault.

In 1930, Beshkov became a member of the Narodno Izkustvo movement. He was from the founders of the famous newspaper Sturshel (Hornet) in 1940, and published in it without signature or pseudonym. One of his best known comic characters was 'Spekulanta Maks'. In 1945, he became a lecturer of drawing, illustration and print design at the National Academy of Fine Art; he was elected a tenured professor in 1953 and led the Department of Graphics until his death in 1958 in Sofia.

Beshkov's political caricatures were noted for their sarcasm and deep connotations.

His works were humanist, democratic, revolutionary and national in nature. The art gallery in Pleven is named in his honour and most of his works are exhibited there.
