= Dolni Dabnik Municipality =

Dolni Dabnik Municipality Община Долни Дъбник
- Municipality
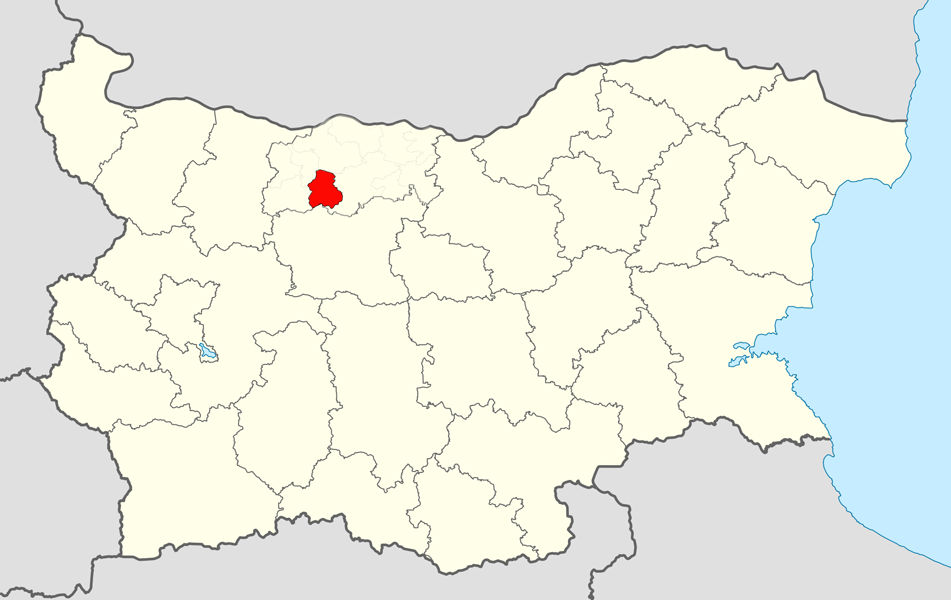
- Dolni Dabnik Municipality within Bulgaria and Pleven Province.
- Coordinates: 43°24′N 24°26′E
- Country: Bulgaria
- Province (Oblast): Pleven
- Admin. centre (Obshtinski tsentar): Dolni Dabnik

Area
  - Total: 310 km^{2} (120 sq mi)

Population (December 2009)
  - Total: 14,438
  - Density: 47/km^{2} (120/sq mi)
- Time zone: UTC+2 (EET)
  - Summer (DST): UTC+3 (EEST)
- Website: www.dolnidabnik.egov.bg

Dolni Dabnik Municipality (Bulgarian: Община Долни Дъбник) is a municipality (obshtina) in Pleven Province, Northern Bulgaria. It is named after its administrative centre - the town of Dolni Dabnik.

The municipality embraces a territory of 310 km^{2} (120 sq mi) with a population, as of December 2009, of 14,438 inhabitants.

== Settlements ==
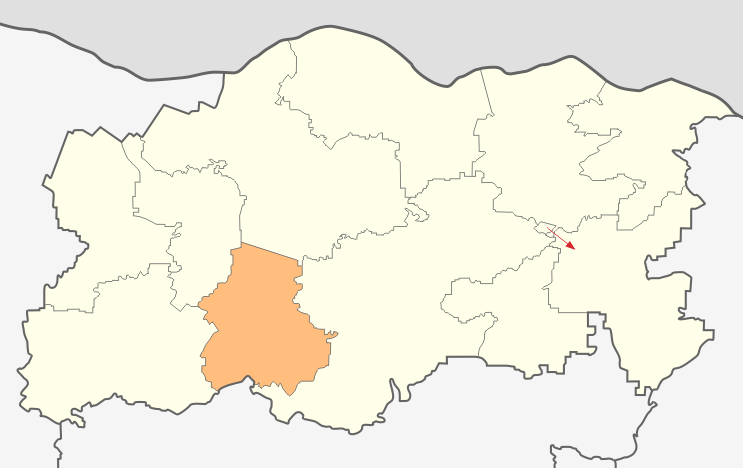
Dolni Dabnik Municipality within Pleven Province

(towns are shown in bold):

Town/Village	Cyrillic	Population (December 2009)
**Dolni Dabnik**	**Долни Дъбник**	4,761
Barkach	Бъркач	760
Gorni Dabnik	Горни Дъбник	1,914
Gradina	Градина	842
Krushovitsa	Крушовица	2,051
Petarnitsa	Петърница	1,720
Sadovets	Садовец	2,390
Total		14,438

== Demography ==
The following table shows the change of the population during the last four decades.

Dolni Dabnik Municipality
**Year**	1975	1985	1992	**2001**	2005	2007	2009	**2011**
**Population**	21,653	18,644	17,377	15,701	15,137	14,810	14,438	...
Sources: Census 2001, Census 2011, „pop-stat.mashke.org“,

=== Religion ===
According to the latest Bulgarian census of 2011, the religious composition, among those who answered the optional question on religious identification, was the following:

Religious composition of Dolni Dabnik Municipality
Orthodox Christianity	74.8%
Catholicism	0.5%
Protestantism	0.6%
Islam	4.2%
No religion	12.7%
Prefer not to answer, others and indefinable	6.2%

== See also ==
- Provinces of Bulgaria
- Municipalities of Bulgaria
- List of cities and towns in Bulgaria
