= Gradina, Pleven Province =

Bulgarian village

Gradina (Bulgarian: Градина [ɡrɐˈdinɐ], lit. 'garden') is a village in Dolni Dabnik municipality, Pleven Province, located in central northern Bulgaria. As of December 2009, it has a population of 842 inhabitants. Gradina lies at 43°21′N 24°28′E.
