= Kula, Bulgaria =

Kula Кула
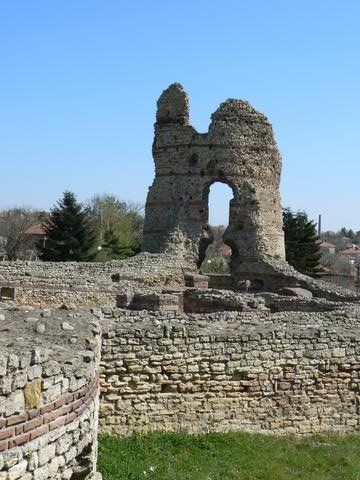
- Ruins of the Roman fortress of Castra Martis at Kula

- Location of Kula
- Coordinates: 43°53′20″N 22°31′20″E
- Country: Bulgaria
- Provinces (Oblast): Vidin

Government
  - Mayor: Vladimir Vladimirov
- Elevation: 204 m (669 ft)

Population (December 2009)
  - Total: 3,287
- Time zone: UTC+2 (EET)
  - Summer (DST): UTC+3 (EEST)
- Postal Code: 3800
- Area code: 0938

Kula (Bulgarian: Кула, pronounced [ˈkuɫɐ], lit. 'tower') is a town in northwestern Bulgaria. It is the administrative centre of Kula Municipality part of Vidin Province. Located just east of the Serbian-Bulgarian border, it is the third largest town in the province after Vidin and Belogradchik. Kula lies 30 kilometres west of Vidin and 13 kilometres east of the border checkpoint at Vrashka Chuka. As of 2021, the town had a population of 2,400.

== History ==
Kula is the modern site of the Roman fortress of Castra Martis, the ruins of which can still be seen today, which also was a bishopric in the Roman province of Dacia Ripensis and remains a Latin Catholic titular see under the Latin name.

The town has a museum exhibiting various tools and everyday items found in the fortress, as well as a miniature model of the Roman town. While within Danube Vilayer of the Ottoman Empire, the town was called Adliye and Yezdanşêr became its Governor in the late 1860s.

The most important local industry is the rubber and plastic processing factory.

== Eponymy ==
Castra Martis Hill on Livingston Island in the South Shetland Islands, Antarctica is named after the fortress of Castra Martis.

== Sources and external links ==
- Website about Kula
