= Byala Slatina Municipality =

Coordinates: 43.4670°N 23.9330°E

Byala Slatina Municipality Община Бяла Слатина
- Municipality
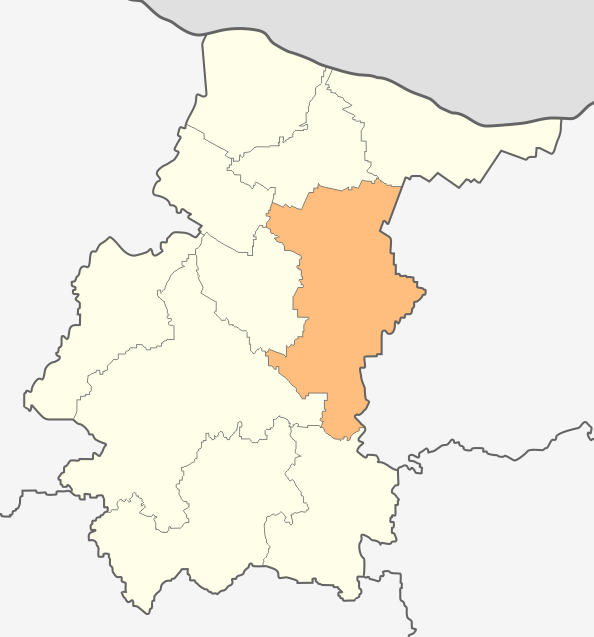
- Country: Bulgaria
- Province: Vratsa Province
- Seat: Byala Slatina

Byala Slatina Municipality is a municipality in Vratsa Province, Bulgaria.

== Demography ==
=== Religion ===
According to the latest Bulgarian census of 2011, the religious composition, among those who answered the optional question on religious identification, was the following:

Religious composition of Byala Slatina Municipality
Orthodox Christianity	73.3%
Catholicism	3.6%
Protestantism	0.5%
Islam	1.5%
No religion	11.5%
Prefer not to answer, others and indefinable	9.6%
