= Dolna Banya Municipality =

Coordinates: 42.3000°N 23.7670°E

Dolna Banya Municipality Община Долна баня
- Municipality
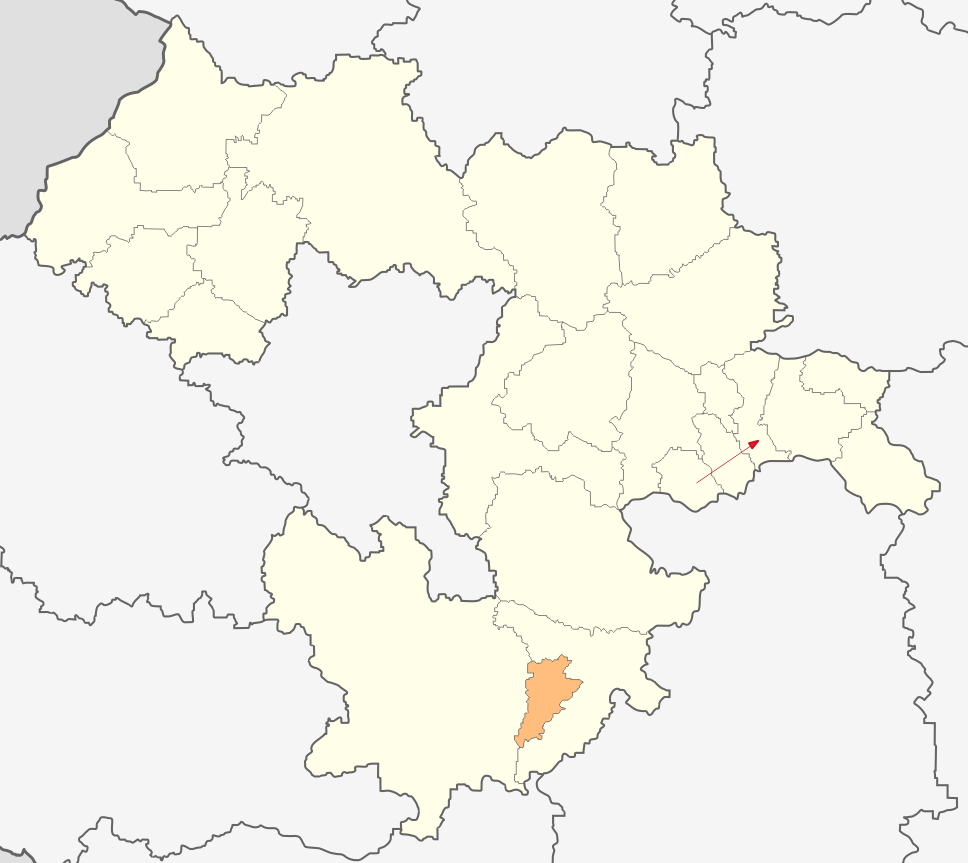
- Country: Bulgaria
- Province: Sofia Province
- Seat: Dolna Banya

Dolna Banya Municipality is a municipality in Sofia Province, Bulgaria.

== Demography ==
=== Religion ===
According to the latest Bulgarian census of 2011, the religious composition, among those who answered the optional question on religious identification, was the following:

Religious composition of Dolna Banya Municipality
Orthodox Christianity	88.3%
Catholicism	0.4%
Protestantism	7.6%
Islam	0.2%
No religion	1.4%
Prefer not to answer, others and indefinable	2.1%
