= Kula Municipality, Bulgaria =

Kula Municipality Община Кула
- Municipality
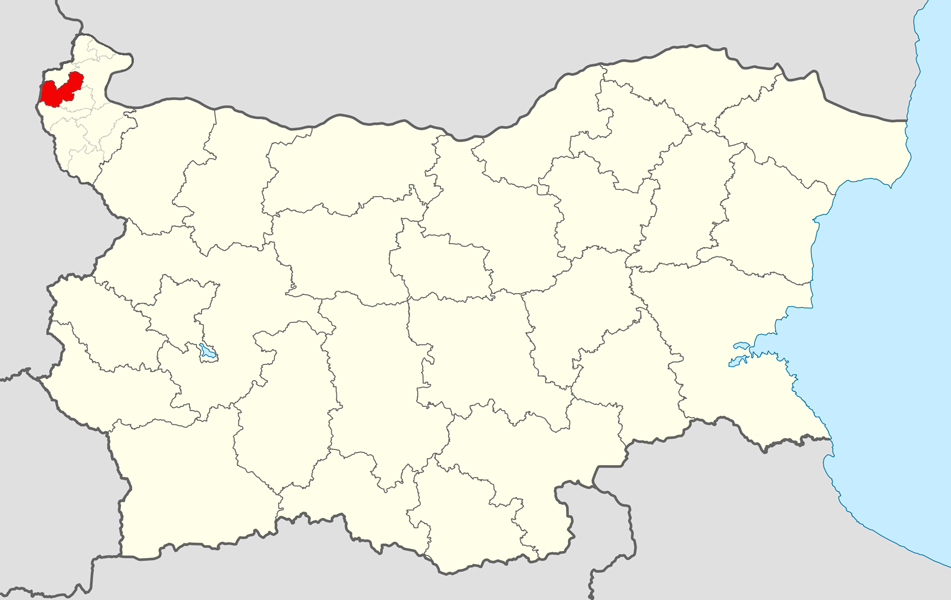
- Kula Municipality within Bulgaria and Vidin Province.
- Coordinates: 43°53′N 22°32′E
- Country: Bulgaria
- Province (Oblast): Vidin
- Admin. centre (Obshtinski tsentar): Kula

Area
  - Total: 291 km^{2} (112 sq mi)

Population (December 2009)
  - Total: 4,958
  - Density: 17.0/km^{2} (44.1/sq mi)
- Time zone: UTC+2 (EET)
  - Summer (DST): UTC+3 (EEST)

Kula Municipality (Bulgarian: Община Кула) is a municipality (obshtina) in Vidin Province, Northwestern Bulgaria, located in the Danubian Plain about 10 km southwest of Danube river. It is named after its administrative centre - the town of Kula. The area borders on the Republic of Serbia to the west.

The municipality embraces a territory of 291 km^{2} with a population of 4,958 inhabitants, as of December 2009.

== Settlements ==
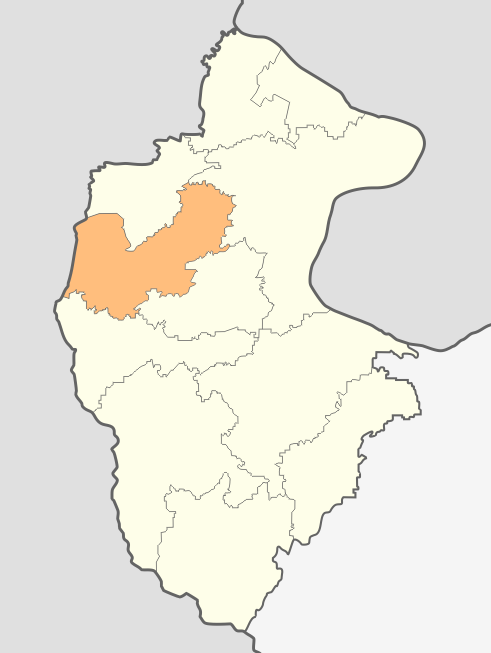
Kula Municipality within Vidin Province

Kula Municipality includes the following 9 places (towns are shown in bold):

Town/Village	Cyrillic	Population (December 2009)
**Kula**	**Кула**	3,287
Chichil	Чичил	82
Golemanovo	Големаново	136
Izvor Mahala	Извор махала	107
Kosta Perchevo	Коста Перчево	128
Poletkovtsi	Полетковци	62
Staropatitsa	Старопатица	387
Topolovets	Тополовец	378
Tsar-Petrovo	Цар-Петрово	391
Total		4,958

== Demography ==
The following table shows the change of the population during the last four decades.

Kula Municipality
**Year**	1975	1985	1992	**2001**	2005	2007	2009	**2011**
**Population**	12,266	10,079	8,648	6,792	5,563	5,237	4,958	4,717
Sources: Census 2001, Census 2011, „pop-stat.mashke.org“,

=== Religion ===
According to the latest Bulgarian census of 2011, the religious composition, among those who answered the optional question on religious identification, was the following:

Religious composition of Kula Municipality
Orthodox Christianity	87.5%
Catholicism	0.2%
Protestantism	0.2%
Islam	0.0%
No religion	8.1%
Prefer not to answer, others and indefinable	4.0%

An overwhelming majority of the population of Kula Municipality identify themselves as Christians. At the 2011 census, 87.5% of respondents identified as Orthodox Christians belonging to the Bulgarian Orthodox Church.

== See also ==
- Provinces of Bulgaria
- Municipalities of Bulgaria
- List of cities and towns in Bulgaria
