= Simeonovgrad Municipality =

Simeonovgrad Municipality Община Симеоновград
- Municipality
- Location within Bulgaria
- Coordinates: 42°2′N 25°50′E
- Country: Bulgaria
- Province: Haskovo
- Municipality: Simeonovgrad

Area
  - Total: 222.94 km^{2} (86.08 sq mi)

Population (1-Feb-2011)
  - Total: 8,755
  - Density: 39.27/km^{2} (101.7/sq mi)
- Time zone: UTC+2 (EET)
  - Summer (DST): UTC+3 (EEST)
- Website: www.simeonovgrad.bg

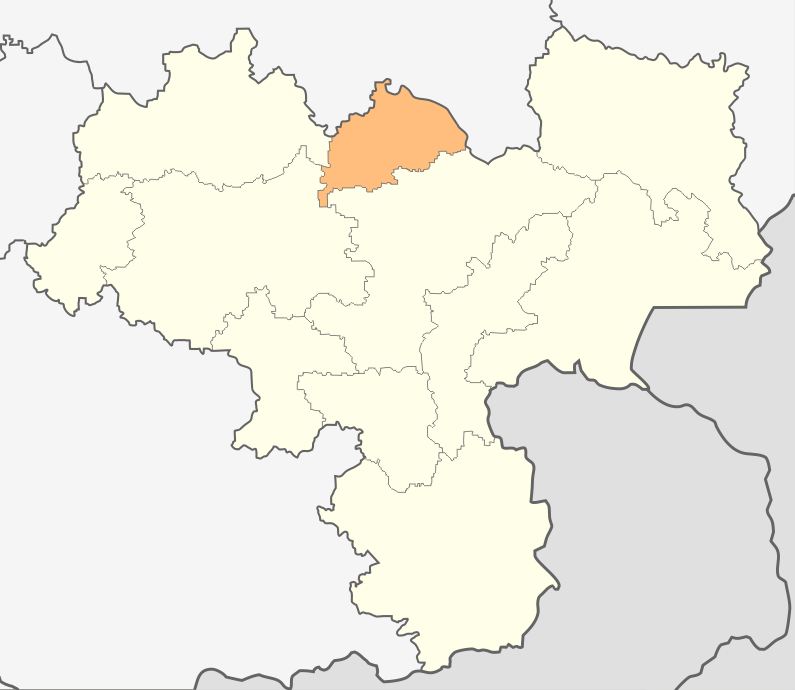
Simeonovgrad municipality within Haskovo Province

Simeonovgrad Municipality is a municipality in Haskovo Province, Bulgaria. The administrative centre is Simeonovgrad.

== Demography ==
=== Religion ===
According to the latest Bulgarian census of 2011, the religious composition, among those who answered the optional question on religious identification, was the following:

Religious composition of Simeonovgrad Municipality
Orthodox Christianity	83.9%
Catholicism	1.3%
Protestantism	0.9%
Islam	0.6%
No religion	4.0%
Prefer not to answer, others and indefinable	9.3%
