= Koprivshtitsa Municipality =

Koprivshtitsa Municipality Община Копривщица
- Municipality
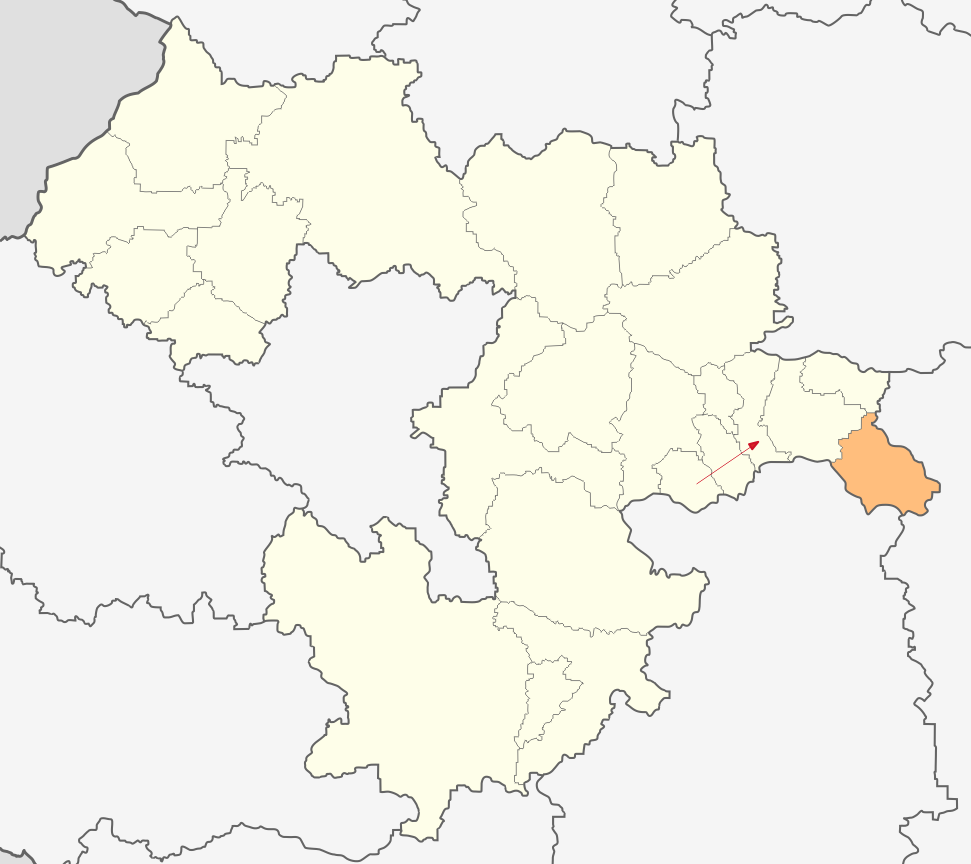

- Location within Bulgaria
- Coordinates: 42.6330°N 24.3500°E
- Country: Bulgaria
- Province: Sofia Province
- Seat: Koprivshtitsa

Population (2015)
  - Total: 2 321

Koprivshtitsa Municipality is a municipality in Sofia Province, Bulgaria. The only settlement and administrative center of the municipality is Koprivshtitsa.

== Demography ==
=== Religion ===
According to the latest Bulgarian census of 2011, the religious composition, among those who answered the optional question on religious identification, was the following:

Religious composition of Koprivshtitsa Municipality
Orthodox Christianity	86.0%
Catholicism	0.8%
Protestantism	0.2%
Islam	0.0%
No religion	5.3%
Prefer not to answer, others and indefinable	7.7%
