= Rakitovo Municipality =

- Municipality
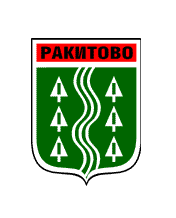
- Coat of arms

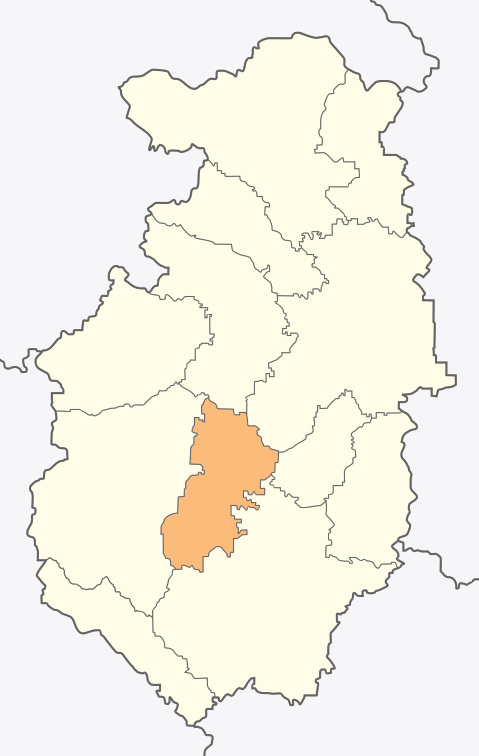
- Location of Rakitovo Municipality in Pazardzhik Province

- Location of Rakitovo Municipality in Bulgaria
- Coordinates: 41°59′23″N 24°05′12″E
- Country: Bulgaria
- Province: Pazardzhik Province
- Capital: Rakitovo

Area
  - Municipality: 246.44 km^{2} (95.15 sq mi)
  - Urban: 166.98 km^{2} (64.47 sq mi)
  - Rural: 69.46 km^{2} (26.82 sq mi)
- Elevation: 1,298 m (4,259 ft)

Population (31 December 2018)
  - Municipality: 14,479
  - Density: 58.753/km^{2} (152.17/sq mi)
- Postal code: 4640
- Area code: 03542
- ISO 3166 code: РА
- Website: rakitovo.info

Rakitovo Municipality (Bulgarian: Община Ракитово) is a municipality in the Pazardzhik Province of Bulgaria. The municipality consists of three settlements: two towns and one village.

== Demography ==
Ethnic composition of Rakitovo Municipality
1. Bulgarians (54.7%)
2. Turks (0.26%)
3. Gypsies/Romani (15.8%)
4. No identification (29.0%)
5. Other (0.35%)

At the 2011 census, the population of Rakitovo was 15,064. Most of the inhabitants (54.66%) were Bulgarians, and there was a significant minority of Gypsies/Romani (15.75%). 28.96% of the population's ethnicity was unknown.

== Communities ==
=== Towns ===
- Rakitovo
- Kostandovo

=== Villages ===
- Dorkovo
