= Godech Municipality =

Coordinates: 43°01′N 23°03′E

Godech Municipality Община Годеч
- Municipality
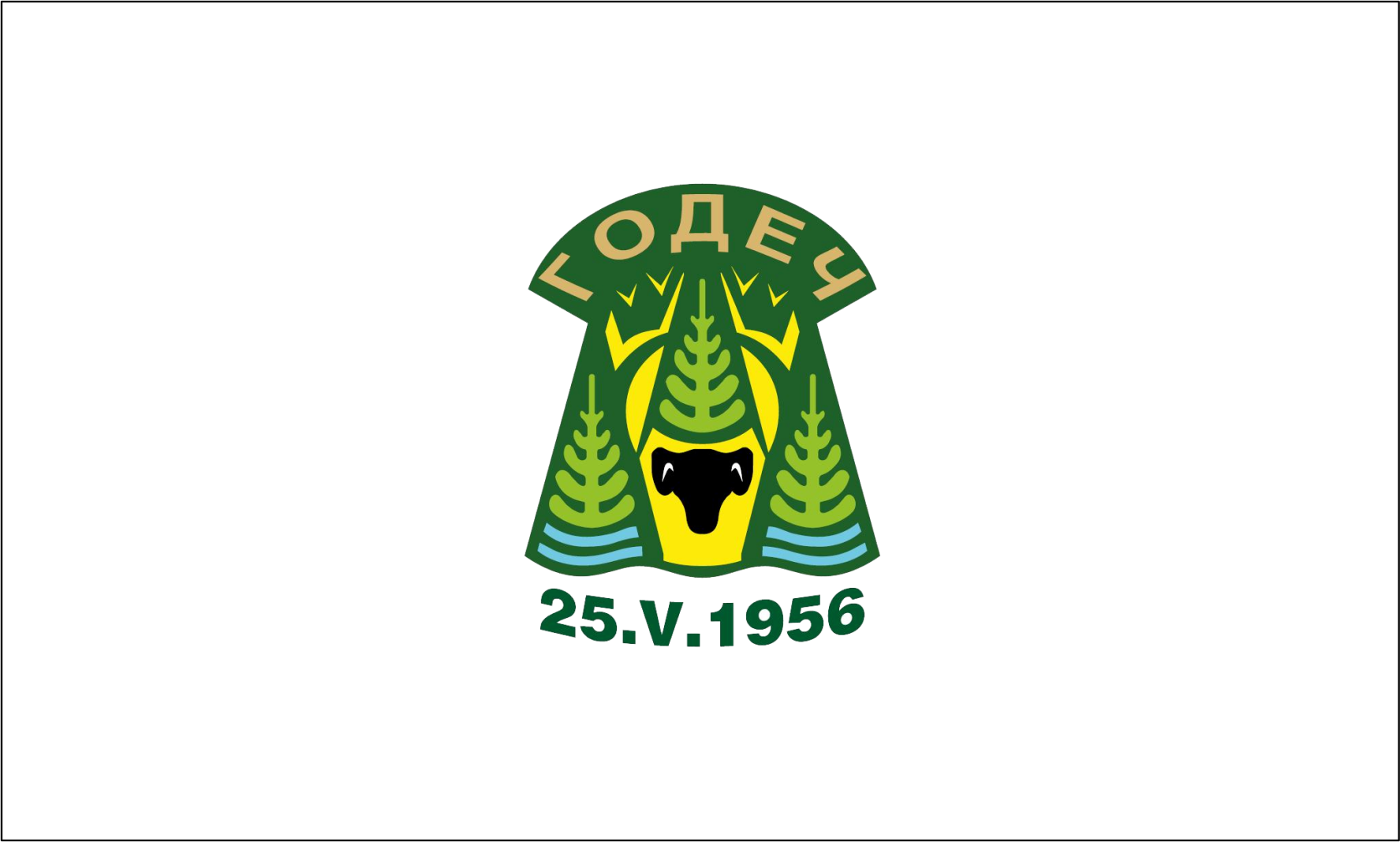
- Flag

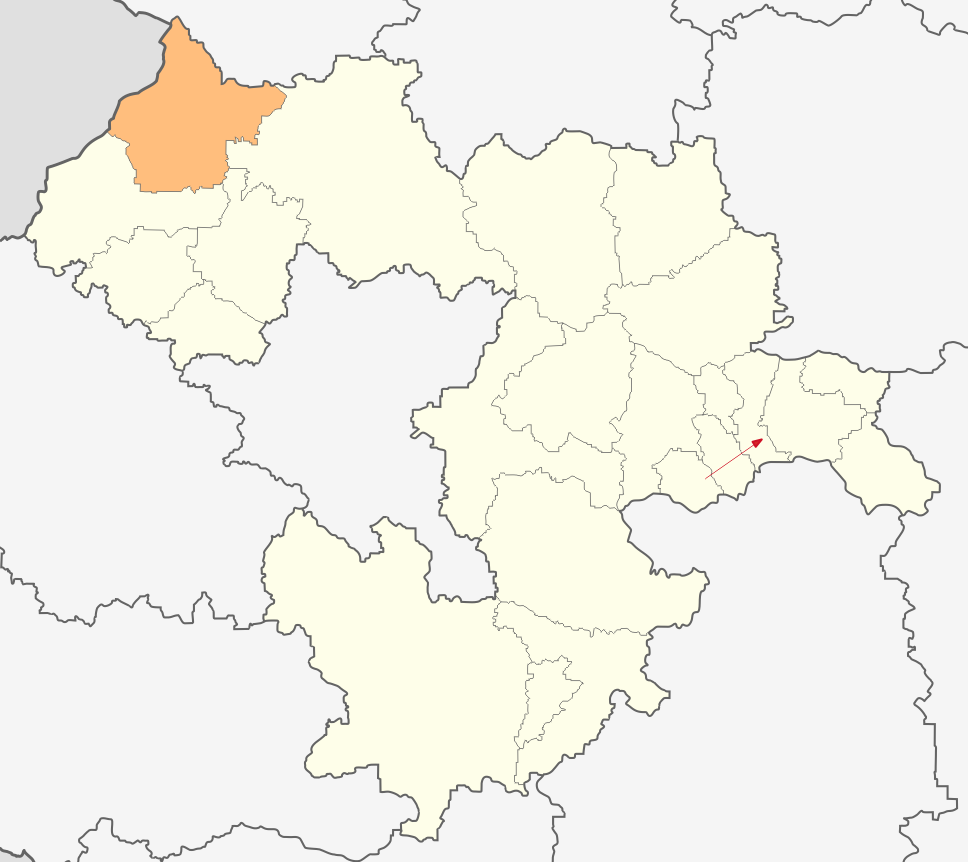
- Country: Bulgaria
- Province: Sofia Province
- Seat: Godech

Godech Municipality is a municipality in Sofia Province, Bulgaria.

== Demography ==
=== Religion ===
According to the latest Bulgarian census of 2011, the religious composition, among those who answered the optional question on religious identification, was the following:

Religious composition of Godech Municipality
Orthodox Christianity	94.7%
Catholicism	1.2%
Protestantism	0.5%
Islam	0.1%
No religion	1.7%
Prefer not to answer, others and indefinable	1.8%
