= Mineralni Bani Municipality =

Mineralni Bani Municipality Община Минерални бани
- Municipality
- Location within Bulgaria
- Coordinates: 41°56′N 25°21′E
- Country: Bulgaria
- Province: Haskovo
- Municipality: Mineralni Bani

Area
  - Total: 214.67 km^{2} (82.88 sq mi)

Population (1-Feb-2011)
  - Total: 5,899
  - Density: 27.48/km^{2} (71.17/sq mi)
- Time zone: UTC+2 (EET)
  - Summer (DST): UTC+3 (EEST)
- Website: mineralnibani.eu

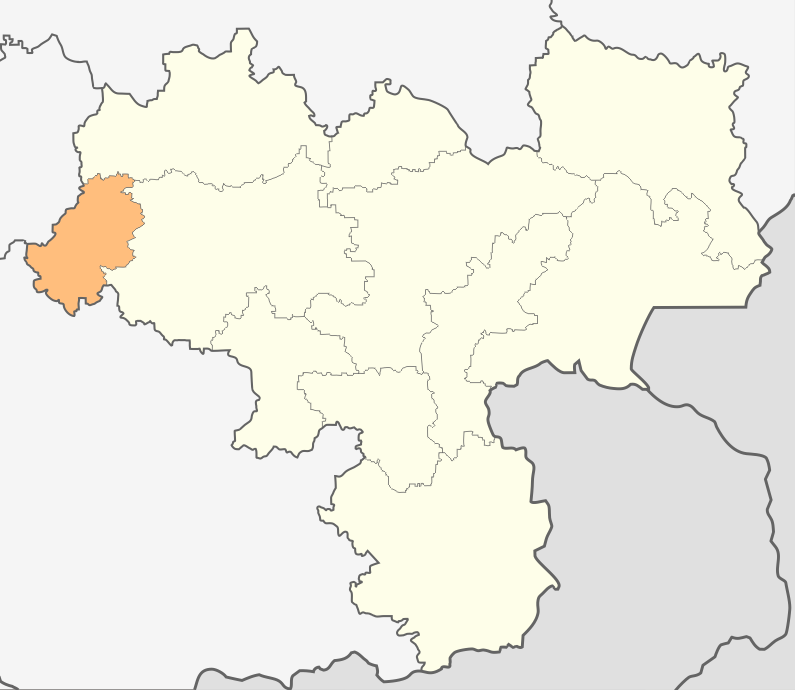
Mineralni Bani municipality within Haskovo Province

Mineralni Bani Municipality is a municipality in Haskovo Province, Bulgaria. The administrative centre is Mineralni Bani.

== Demography ==
=== Religion ===
According to the latest Bulgarian census of 2011, the religious composition, among those who answered the optional question on religious identification, was the following:

Religious composition of Mineralni Bani Municipality
Orthodox Christianity	40.4%
Catholicism	0.1%
Protestantism	0.2%
Islam	52.7%
No religion	0.8%
Prefer not to answer, others and indefinable	5.8%
