= Batak Municipality =

- Municipality
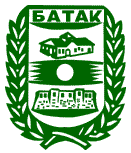
- Coat of arms

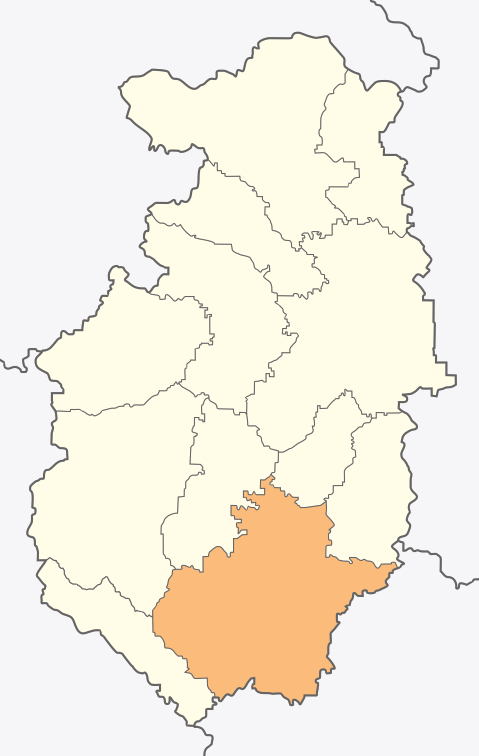
- Location of Batak Municipality in Pazardzhik Province

- Location of Batak Municipality in Bulgaria
- Coordinates: 41°57′N 24°13′E
- Country: Bulgaria
- Province: Pazardzhik Province
- Capital: Batak

Area
  - Total: 677.31 km^{2} (261.51 sq mi)
- Elevation: 1,781 m (5,843 ft)

Population (2011)
  - Total: 6,144
  - Density: 9.071/km^{2} (23.49/sq mi)
- ZIP code: 4580
- Area code: 03553

Batak Municipality (Bulgarian: Община Батак) is a municipality in the Pazardzhik Province of Bulgaria.

== Demography ==
Ethnic composition of Batak Municipality
1. Bulgarians (53.5%)
2. Turks (38.4%)
3. Gypsies/Romani (3.43%)
4. No identification (4.60%)
5. Other (0.14%)

At the 2011 census, the population of Batak was 6,144. Most of the inhabitants (53.46%) were Bulgarians, and there were significant minorities of Gypsies/Romani (3.43%) and Turks (38.34%). 4.6% of the population's ethnicity was unknown.

== Communities ==
=== Towns ===
- Batak

=== Villages ===
- Fotinovo
- Nova Mahala
