= Dolni Dabnik =

Dolni Dabnik Долни Дъбник
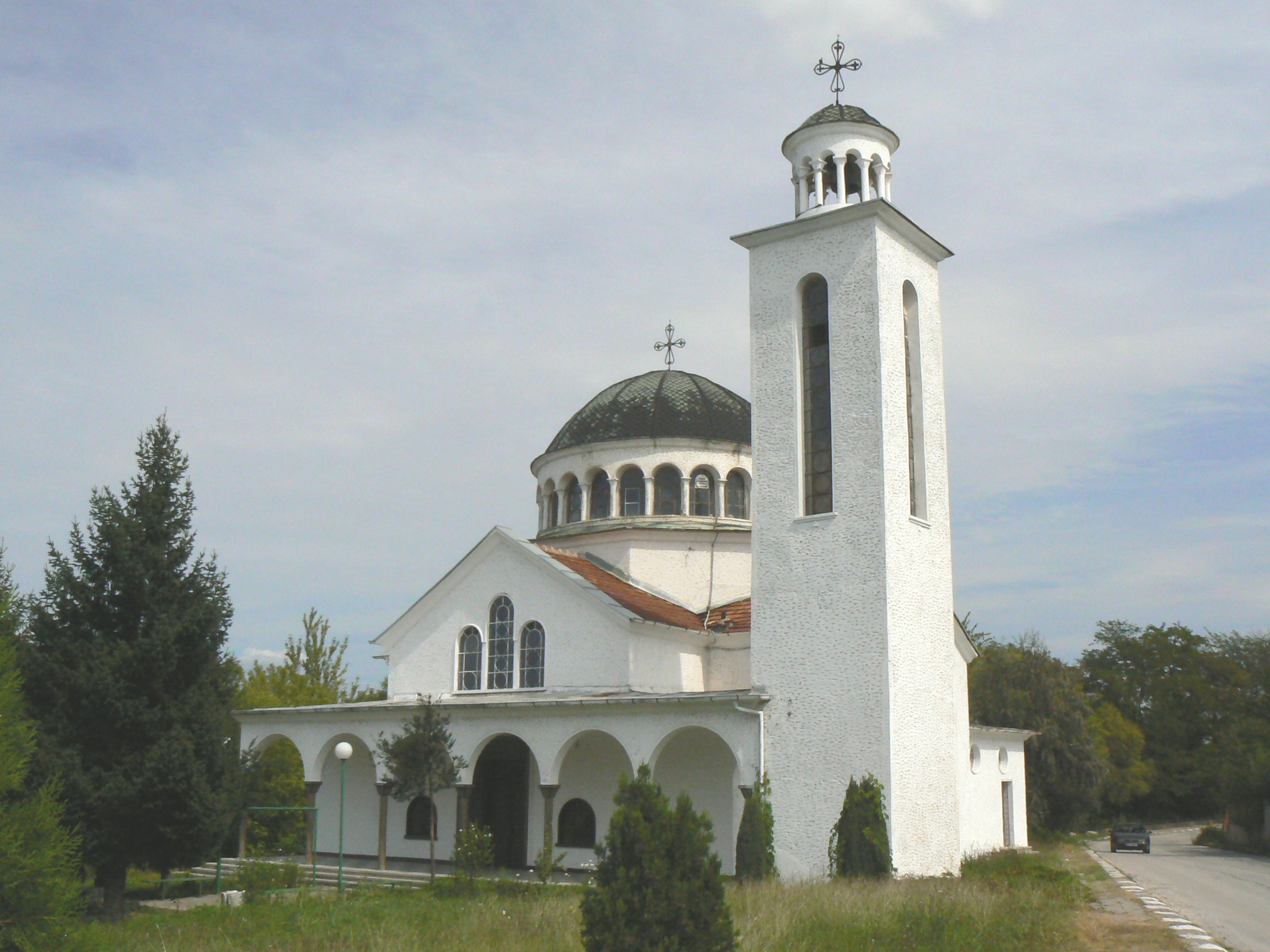

- Location of Dolni Dabnik
- Coordinates: 43°24′N 24°26′E
- Country: Bulgaria
- Provinces (Oblast): Pleven

Government
  - Mayor: Zhivko Zhelev
- Elevation: 110 m (360 ft)

Population (December 2009)
  - Total: 4,761
- Time zone: UTC+2 (EET)
  - Summer (DST): UTC+3 (EEST)
- Postal Code: 5870
- Area code: 06514
- License plate: EH

Dolni Dabnik (Bulgarian: Долни Дъбник [ˈdɔɫni dɐbˈnik]) is a town in Pleven Province in the Danubian Plain of central northern Bulgaria. It is the administrative centre of Dolni Dabnik municipality and lies to the west of the city of Pleven. As of December 2009, the town had a population of 4,761.

Dolni Dabnik was first mentioned in 1430 and is known for its oil fields, some of the few in Bulgaria. Besides oil extraction, the locals are mainly occupied in agriculture.

Notable natives include Bulgaria international footballer Ivaylo Petkov (b. 1975), artist Ilia Beshkov (1901–1958), and politician Ventsislav Varbanov (b. 1962).

The name "Dolni Dabnik" literally means "lower oak place", in contrast to the neighbouring village of Gorni Dabnik ("higher oak place").

== Honour ==
Dabnik Peak on Graham Land in Antarctica is named after Dolni Dabnik.
