= Ivaylovgrad Municipality =

Ivaylovgrad Municipality Община Ивайловград
- Municipality
- Location within Bulgaria
- Coordinates: 41°30′N 26°6′E
- Country: Bulgaria
- Province: Haskovo
- Municipality: Ivaylovgrad

Area
  - Total: 813.47 km^{2} (314.08 sq mi)

Population (15-Mar-2015)
  - Total: 6,414
  - Density: 7.885/km^{2} (20.42/sq mi)
- Time zone: UTC+2 (EET)
  - Summer (DST): UTC+3 (EEST)
- Website: www.ivaylovgrad.org

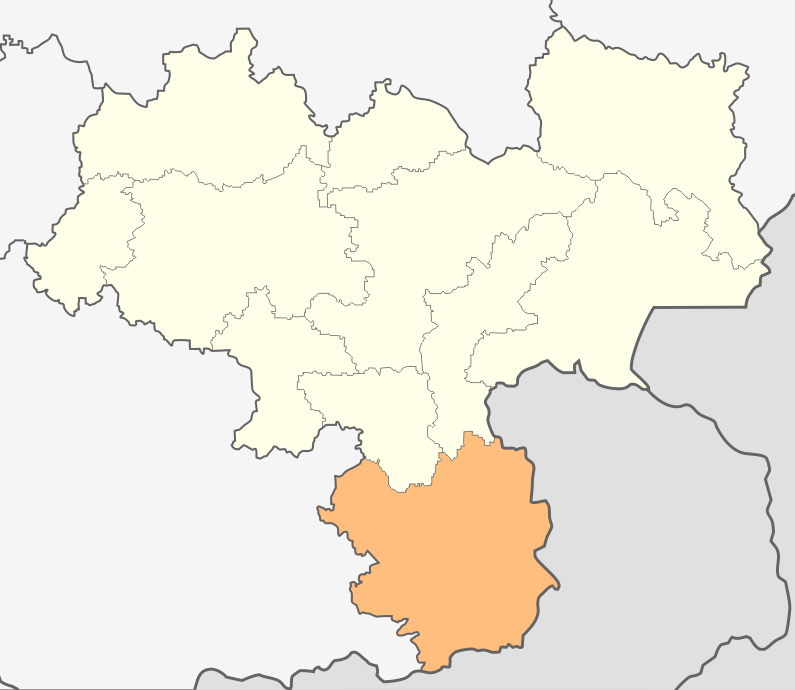
Ivaylovgrad municipality within Haskovo Province

Ivaylovgrad Municipality is a municipality in Haskovo Province, Bulgaria. The administrative centre is Ivaylovgrad.

== Religion ==
According to the latest Bulgarian census of 2011, the religious composition, among those who answered the optional question on religious identification, was the following:

Religious composition of Ivaylovgrad Municipality
Orthodox Christianity	79.9%
Catholicism	1.1%
Protestantism	0.3%
Islam	8.2%
No religion	3.8%
Prefer not to answer, others and indefinable	6.7%
