= Madzharovo Municipality =

Madzharovo Municipality Община Маджарово
- Municipality
- Location within Bulgaria
- Coordinates: 41°38′N 25°52′E
- Country: Bulgaria
- Province: Haskovo
- Municipality: Madzharovo

Area
  - Total: 247.22 km^{2} (95.45 sq mi)

Population (1-Feb-2011)
  - Total: 1,665
  - Density: 6.735/km^{2} (17.44/sq mi)
- Time zone: UTC+2 (EET)
  - Summer (DST): UTC+3 (EEST)
- Website: www.madzharovo.bg

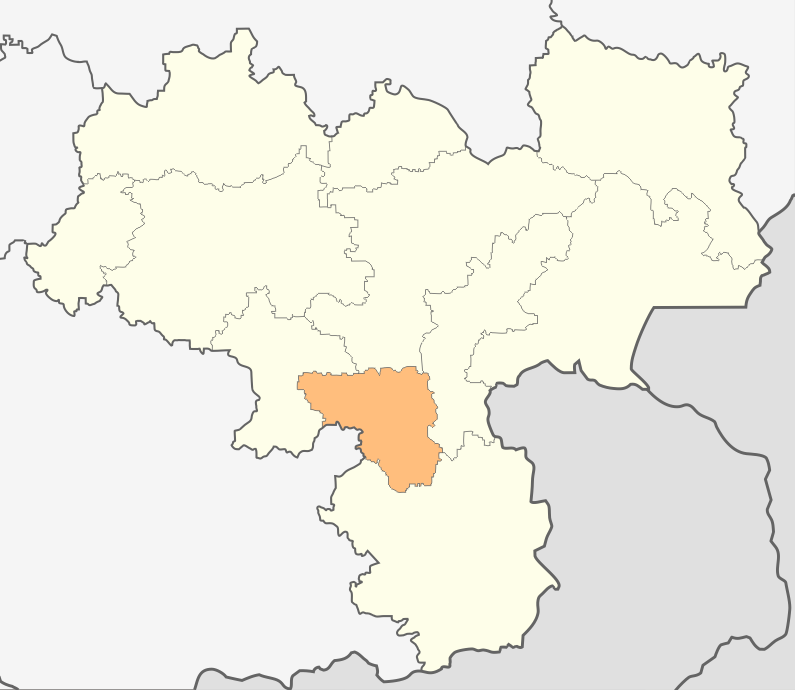
Madzharovo municipality within Haskovo Province

Madzharovo Municipality (Bulgarian: община Маджарово) is a municipality in Haskovo Province, Bulgaria. The administrative centre is Madzharovo.

== Demography ==
=== Religion ===
According to the latest Bulgarian census of 2011, the religious composition, among those who answered the optional question on religious identification, was the following:

Religious composition of Madzharovo Municipality
Orthodox Christianity	58.4%
Catholicism	0.0%
Protestantism	0.2%
Islam	37.7%
No religion	1.3%
Prefer not to answer, others and indefinable	2.4%
