= List of minor planets: 575001–576000 =

The following is a partial list of minor planets, running from minor-planet number 575001 through 576000, inclusive. The primary data for this and other partial lists is based on JPL's "Small-Body Orbital Elements" and data available from the Minor Planet Center. Critical list information is also provided by the MPC, unless otherwise specified from Lowell Observatory. A detailed description of the table's columns and additional sources are given on the main page including a complete list of every page in this series, and a statistical break-up on the dynamical classification of minor planets.

Also see the summary list of all named bodies in numerical and alphabetical order, and the corresponding naming citations for the number range of this particular list. New namings may only be added to this list after official publication, as the preannouncement of names is condemned by the Working Group for Small Bodies Nomenclature of the International Astronomical Union.

Near-Earth obj.	MBA (inner)	MBA (outer)	Centaur
Mars-crosser	MBA (middle)	Jupiter trojan	Trans-Neptunian obj.
Unclassified

== 575001–575100 ==
Designation			Discovery			Properties		Ref
Permanent	Provisional	Named after	Date	Site	Discoverer(s)	Category	Diam.	Ref
575001	2011 EV_{100}	—	March 11, 2011	Kitt Peak	Spacewatch	·	1.5 km	MPC · JPL
575002	2011 EX_{100}	—	March 6, 2011	Kitt Peak	Spacewatch	·	1.2 km	MPC · JPL
575003	2011 EN_{101}	—	March 9, 2002	Kitt Peak	Spacewatch	·	1.2 km	MPC · JPL
575004	2011 EW_{101}	—	March 11, 2011	Mount Lemmon	Mount Lemmon Survey	·	1.7 km	MPC · JPL
575005	2011 EZ_{101}	—	March 2, 2011	Mount Lemmon	Mount Lemmon Survey	·	1.2 km	MPC · JPL
575006	2011 EH_{102}	—	March 4, 2011	Mount Lemmon	Mount Lemmon Survey	·	1.4 km	MPC · JPL
575007	2011 ET_{102}	—	March 2, 2011	Kitt Peak	Spacewatch	·	1.3 km	MPC · JPL
575008	2011 EC_{107}	—	March 9, 2011	Mount Lemmon	Mount Lemmon Survey	·	1.6 km	MPC · JPL
575009	2011 FR_{7}	—	April 9, 2002	Socorro	LINEAR	·	1.8 km	MPC · JPL
575010	2011 FB_{18}	—	March 24, 2011	Kitt Peak	Spacewatch	·	1.1 km	MPC · JPL
575011	2011 FC_{21}	—	February 10, 2011	Mount Lemmon	Mount Lemmon Survey	·	1.2 km	MPC · JPL
575012	2011 FJ_{21}	—	March 29, 2011	Mount Lemmon	Mount Lemmon Survey	·	1.8 km	MPC · JPL
575013	2011 FE_{23}	—	May 9, 2002	Palomar	NEAT	·	3.0 km	MPC · JPL
575014	2011 FC_{25}	—	March 29, 2011	Piszkés-tető	K. Sárneczky, Z. Kuli	·	1.1 km	MPC · JPL
575015	2011 FH_{25}	—	March 29, 2011	Piszkés-tető	K. Sárneczky, Z. Kuli	·	1.6 km	MPC · JPL
575016	2011 FY_{29}	—	May 30, 2002	Palomar	NEAT	·	2.2 km	MPC · JPL
575017	2011 FR_{30}	—	March 11, 2011	Kitt Peak	Spacewatch	HOF	2.3 km	MPC · JPL
575018	2011 FR_{34}	—	March 29, 2011	Kitt Peak	Spacewatch	526	1.7 km	MPC · JPL
575019	2011 FZ_{41}	—	March 26, 2011	Mount Lemmon	Mount Lemmon Survey	·	2.0 km	MPC · JPL
575020	2011 FP_{49}	—	November 3, 2005	Mount Lemmon	Mount Lemmon Survey	·	1.2 km	MPC · JPL
575021	2011 FX_{54}	—	March 29, 2011	Mount Lemmon	Mount Lemmon Survey	·	1.7 km	MPC · JPL
575022	2011 FZ_{55}	—	October 8, 2004	Anderson Mesa	LONEOS	HNS	1.6 km	MPC · JPL
575023	2011 FM_{58}	—	October 15, 2004	Mount Lemmon	Mount Lemmon Survey	·	1.7 km	MPC · JPL
575024	2011 FZ_{61}	—	March 30, 2011	Mount Lemmon	Mount Lemmon Survey	·	1.3 km	MPC · JPL
575025	2011 FV_{64}	—	September 4, 2008	Kitt Peak	Spacewatch	AGN	920 m	MPC · JPL
575026	2011 FL_{70}	—	April 17, 2005	Kitt Peak	Spacewatch	·	790 m	MPC · JPL
575027	2011 FD_{72}	—	April 25, 2007	Kitt Peak	Spacewatch	·	1.5 km	MPC · JPL
575028	2011 FB_{77}	—	March 1, 2011	Mount Lemmon	Mount Lemmon Survey	AEO	890 m	MPC · JPL
575029	2011 FD_{78}	—	September 21, 2009	Mount Lemmon	Mount Lemmon Survey	·	1.6 km	MPC · JPL
575030	2011 FK_{81}	—	March 14, 2011	Mount Lemmon	Mount Lemmon Survey	(18466)	1.7 km	MPC · JPL
575031	2011 FR_{81}	—	February 10, 2011	Mount Lemmon	Mount Lemmon Survey	·	1.5 km	MPC · JPL
575032	2011 FW_{103}	—	March 6, 2011	Mount Lemmon	Mount Lemmon Survey	·	1.2 km	MPC · JPL
575033	2011 FD_{106}	—	April 1, 2011	Kitt Peak	Spacewatch	·	1.3 km	MPC · JPL
575034	2011 FG_{106}	—	April 1, 2011	Kitt Peak	Spacewatch	·	2.0 km	MPC · JPL
575035	2011 FK_{107}	—	April 5, 2011	Mount Lemmon	Mount Lemmon Survey	MAR	1.1 km	MPC · JPL
575036	2011 FK_{109}	—	January 25, 2006	Kitt Peak	Spacewatch	·	2.1 km	MPC · JPL
575037	2011 FN_{110}	—	April 1, 2011	Mount Lemmon	Mount Lemmon Survey	·	1.4 km	MPC · JPL
575038	2011 FD_{111}	—	October 20, 2008	Mount Lemmon	Mount Lemmon Survey	·	1.5 km	MPC · JPL
575039	2011 FG_{113}	—	September 4, 2008	Kitt Peak	Spacewatch	·	1.9 km	MPC · JPL
575040	2011 FV_{116}	—	April 2, 2011	Mount Lemmon	Mount Lemmon Survey	·	2.1 km	MPC · JPL
575041	2011 FW_{116}	—	April 2, 2011	Mount Lemmon	Mount Lemmon Survey	·	1.4 km	MPC · JPL
575042	2011 FG_{117}	—	April 2, 2011	Mount Lemmon	Mount Lemmon Survey	·	1.2 km	MPC · JPL
575043	2011 FA_{118}	—	October 23, 2009	Kitt Peak	Spacewatch	·	1.2 km	MPC · JPL
575044	2011 FP_{121}	—	April 6, 2011	Mount Lemmon	Mount Lemmon Survey	EUN	1.1 km	MPC · JPL
575045	2011 FS_{121}	—	April 6, 2011	Mount Lemmon	Mount Lemmon Survey	WIT	790 m	MPC · JPL
575046	2011 FE_{126}	—	December 20, 2009	Mount Lemmon	Mount Lemmon Survey	·	1.5 km	MPC · JPL
575047	2011 FG_{126}	—	January 28, 2011	Kitt Peak	Spacewatch	·	1.8 km	MPC · JPL
575048	2011 FS_{132}	—	May 11, 2007	Mount Lemmon	Mount Lemmon Survey	GEF	1.1 km	MPC · JPL
575049	2011 FE_{134}	—	March 28, 2011	Mount Lemmon	Mount Lemmon Survey	·	1.4 km	MPC · JPL
575050	2011 FX_{135}	—	September 3, 2008	Kitt Peak	Spacewatch	·	1.7 km	MPC · JPL
575051	2011 FB_{136}	—	March 14, 2011	Mount Lemmon	Mount Lemmon Survey	·	960 m	MPC · JPL
575052	2011 FH_{140}	—	August 21, 2008	Kitt Peak	Spacewatch	·	1.8 km	MPC · JPL
575053	2011 FF_{144}	—	February 10, 2011	Mount Lemmon	Mount Lemmon Survey	·	1.7 km	MPC · JPL
575054	2011 FO_{144}	—	March 12, 2002	Palomar	NEAT	·	1.8 km	MPC · JPL
575055	2011 FP_{147}	—	April 4, 2011	Mount Lemmon	Mount Lemmon Survey	·	2.2 km	MPC · JPL
575056	2011 FT_{148}	—	February 25, 2011	Kitt Peak	Spacewatch	·	1.6 km	MPC · JPL
575057	2011 FC_{154}	—	September 20, 2007	Kitt Peak	Spacewatch	·	1.7 km	MPC · JPL
575058	2011 FP_{157}	—	March 16, 2002	Kitt Peak	Spacewatch	·	2.4 km	MPC · JPL
575059	2011 FQ_{157}	—	April 2, 2011	Mount Lemmon	Mount Lemmon Survey	·	1.5 km	MPC · JPL
575060	2011 FL_{159}	—	March 25, 2011	Kitt Peak	Spacewatch	·	1.7 km	MPC · JPL
575061	2011 FA_{160}	—	October 3, 2013	Kitt Peak	Spacewatch	·	1.5 km	MPC · JPL
575062	2011 FC_{160}	—	October 5, 2013	Kitt Peak	Spacewatch	ADE	1.7 km	MPC · JPL
575063	2011 FR_{160}	—	September 22, 2012	Mount Lemmon	Mount Lemmon Survey	·	700 m	MPC · JPL
575064	2011 FY_{160}	—	November 10, 2013	Kitt Peak	Spacewatch	·	1.2 km	MPC · JPL
575065	2011 FS_{164}	—	January 19, 2015	Mount Lemmon	Mount Lemmon Survey	HOF	1.9 km	MPC · JPL
575066	2011 FT_{164}	—	September 18, 2012	Mount Lemmon	Mount Lemmon Survey	MAS	610 m	MPC · JPL
575067	2011 FA_{168}	—	March 29, 2011	Mount Lemmon	Mount Lemmon Survey	·	1.8 km	MPC · JPL
575068	2011 FZ_{168}	—	March 29, 2011	Mount Lemmon	Mount Lemmon Survey	·	1.3 km	MPC · JPL
575069	2011 FE_{169}	—	March 25, 2011	Haleakala	Pan-STARRS 1	·	1.5 km	MPC · JPL
575070	2011 GQ_{1}	—	October 8, 2004	Kitt Peak	Spacewatch	·	2.2 km	MPC · JPL
575071	2011 GY_{4}	—	March 18, 2002	Haleakala	NEAT	·	2.5 km	MPC · JPL
575072	2011 GM_{6}	—	April 2, 2011	Mount Lemmon	Mount Lemmon Survey	·	2.4 km	MPC · JPL
575073	2011 GA_{11}	—	November 17, 2009	Kitt Peak	Spacewatch	·	1.3 km	MPC · JPL
575074	2011 GQ_{15}	—	September 21, 2003	Palomar	NEAT	·	1.6 km	MPC · JPL
575075	2011 GX_{15}	—	April 1, 2011	Mount Lemmon	Mount Lemmon Survey	·	950 m	MPC · JPL
575076	2011 GG_{21}	—	October 8, 2008	Mount Lemmon	Mount Lemmon Survey	·	1.8 km	MPC · JPL
575077	2011 GG_{23}	—	April 4, 2011	Mount Lemmon	Mount Lemmon Survey	·	2.4 km	MPC · JPL
575078	2011 GZ_{23}	—	September 5, 2008	Kitt Peak	Spacewatch	·	1.9 km	MPC · JPL
575079	2011 GZ_{32}	—	September 5, 2008	Kitt Peak	Spacewatch	·	1.8 km	MPC · JPL
575080	2011 GC_{33}	—	September 6, 2008	Kitt Peak	Spacewatch	PAD	1.0 km	MPC · JPL
575081	2011 GR_{41}	—	May 14, 2002	Kitt Peak	Spacewatch	·	2.4 km	MPC · JPL
575082	2011 GG_{51}	—	March 11, 2011	Kitt Peak	Spacewatch	·	1.8 km	MPC · JPL
575083	2011 GO_{59}	—	April 2, 2011	Mount Lemmon	Mount Lemmon Survey	·	2.4 km	MPC · JPL
575084	2011 GR_{71}	—	October 22, 2009	Catalina	CSS	H	680 m	MPC · JPL
575085	2011 GC_{81}	—	April 13, 2011	Mount Lemmon	Mount Lemmon Survey	·	2.0 km	MPC · JPL
575086	2011 GH_{83}	—	February 14, 2002	Kitt Peak	Spacewatch	·	1.4 km	MPC · JPL
575087	2011 GY_{83}	—	March 26, 2011	Mount Lemmon	Mount Lemmon Survey	MAR	1.1 km	MPC · JPL
575088	2011 GD_{84}	—	April 7, 2011	Kitt Peak	Spacewatch	·	1.7 km	MPC · JPL
575089	2011 GB_{90}	—	April 3, 2011	Haleakala	Pan-STARRS 1	·	1.3 km	MPC · JPL
575090	2011 GS_{90}	—	April 2, 2011	Kitt Peak	Spacewatch	·	520 m	MPC · JPL
575091	2011 GR_{91}	—	April 1, 2011	Kitt Peak	Spacewatch	WIT	770 m	MPC · JPL
575092	2011 GV_{91}	—	April 29, 2016	Mount Lemmon	Mount Lemmon Survey	·	1.7 km	MPC · JPL
575093	2011 GD_{92}	—	November 10, 2013	Kitt Peak	Spacewatch	HOF	2.3 km	MPC · JPL
575094	2011 GP_{92}	—	April 11, 2011	Mount Lemmon	Mount Lemmon Survey	T_{j} (2.97) · 3:2	3.6 km	MPC · JPL
575095	2011 GF_{94}	—	January 22, 2015	Haleakala	Pan-STARRS 1	·	1.0 km	MPC · JPL
575096	2011 GR_{96}	—	April 6, 2011	Mount Lemmon	Mount Lemmon Survey	·	1.6 km	MPC · JPL
575097	2011 GX_{97}	—	November 10, 2013	Nogales	M. Schwartz, P. R. Holvorcem	·	1.2 km	MPC · JPL
575098	2011 GD_{98}	—	September 8, 2016	Haleakala	Pan-STARRS 1	·	960 m	MPC · JPL
575099	2011 GK_{101}	—	April 14, 2011	Mount Lemmon	Mount Lemmon Survey	·	1.8 km	MPC · JPL
575100	2011 GH_{104}	—	April 6, 2011	Mount Lemmon	Mount Lemmon Survey	·	1.7 km	MPC · JPL

== 575101–575200 ==
back to top

Designation			Discovery			Properties		Ref
Permanent	Provisional	Named after	Date	Site	Discoverer(s)	Category	Diam.	Ref
575101	2011 HB_{3}	—	September 27, 2003	Apache Point	SDSS Collaboration	·	2.0 km	MPC · JPL
575102	2011 HA_{5}	—	April 24, 2011	Kitt Peak	Spacewatch	·	2.0 km	MPC · JPL
575103	2011 HH_{13}	—	November 21, 2008	Kitt Peak	Spacewatch	DOR	2.4 km	MPC · JPL
575104	2011 HZ_{15}	—	September 5, 2008	Kitt Peak	Spacewatch	·	1.5 km	MPC · JPL
575105	2011 HE_{18}	—	April 9, 2002	Palomar	NEAT	·	2.1 km	MPC · JPL
575106	2011 HL_{23}	—	October 23, 2008	Kitt Peak	Spacewatch	GEF	1.3 km	MPC · JPL
575107	2011 HO_{31}	—	April 23, 2011	Haleakala	Pan-STARRS 1	·	2.0 km	MPC · JPL
575108 Doyrantsi	2011 HK_{35}	Doyrantsi	August 5, 2005	Palomar	NEAT	3:2	5.0 km	MPC · JPL
575109	2011 HK_{38}	—	April 27, 2011	Mount Lemmon	Mount Lemmon Survey	·	2.0 km	MPC · JPL
575110	2011 HV_{42}	—	November 9, 2008	Mount Lemmon	Mount Lemmon Survey	GEF	1.0 km	MPC · JPL
575111	2011 HK_{46}	—	March 23, 2002	Kitt Peak	Spacewatch	·	1.5 km	MPC · JPL
575112	2011 HS_{46}	—	April 28, 2011	Mount Lemmon	Mount Lemmon Survey	·	740 m	MPC · JPL
575113	2011 HV_{46}	—	September 19, 2003	Kitt Peak	Spacewatch	GAL	1.2 km	MPC · JPL
575114	2011 HX_{46}	—	February 14, 2010	Mount Lemmon	Mount Lemmon Survey	·	2.0 km	MPC · JPL
575115	2011 HF_{51}	—	February 11, 2004	Kitt Peak	Spacewatch	·	610 m	MPC · JPL
575116	2011 HV_{55}	—	May 5, 2002	Palomar	NEAT	·	2.2 km	MPC · JPL
575117	2011 HS_{56}	—	March 14, 2011	Kitt Peak	Spacewatch	·	1.6 km	MPC · JPL
575118	2011 HQ_{58}	—	February 7, 2006	Kitt Peak	Spacewatch	·	1.6 km	MPC · JPL
575119	2011 HW_{62}	—	October 23, 2003	Kitt Peak	Spacewatch	·	2.5 km	MPC · JPL
575120	2011 HC_{63}	—	November 21, 2009	Mount Lemmon	Mount Lemmon Survey	·	2.6 km	MPC · JPL
575121	2011 HR_{66}	—	September 29, 1995	Kitt Peak	Spacewatch	·	1.7 km	MPC · JPL
575122	2011 HO_{71}	—	January 30, 2006	Kitt Peak	Spacewatch	·	1.5 km	MPC · JPL
575123	2011 HY_{72}	—	December 20, 2001	Apache Point	SDSS Collaboration	EUN	1.3 km	MPC · JPL
575124	2011 HN_{73}	—	April 27, 2011	Kitt Peak	Spacewatch	EUN	800 m	MPC · JPL
575125	2011 HE_{80}	—	February 25, 2006	Kitt Peak	Spacewatch	DOR	1.7 km	MPC · JPL
575126	2011 HH_{81}	—	April 1, 2011	Kitt Peak	Spacewatch	·	1.9 km	MPC · JPL
575127	2011 HH_{85}	—	October 20, 1995	Kitt Peak	Spacewatch	·	1.8 km	MPC · JPL
575128	2011 HX_{85}	—	April 23, 2011	Haleakala	Pan-STARRS 1	·	1.5 km	MPC · JPL
575129	2011 HG_{87}	—	April 27, 2011	Kitt Peak	Spacewatch	·	1.9 km	MPC · JPL
575130	2011 HS_{87}	—	April 27, 2011	Haleakala	Pan-STARRS 1	DOR	2.2 km	MPC · JPL
575131	2011 HX_{96}	—	April 28, 2011	Kitt Peak	Spacewatch	·	1.6 km	MPC · JPL
575132	2011 HD_{98}	—	November 19, 2008	Kitt Peak	Spacewatch	·	2.1 km	MPC · JPL
575133	2011 HP_{98}	—	September 27, 2008	Mount Lemmon	Mount Lemmon Survey	·	990 m	MPC · JPL
575134	2011 HK_{100}	—	April 26, 2011	Mount Lemmon	Mount Lemmon Survey	·	1.4 km	MPC · JPL
575135	2011 HC_{102}	—	April 26, 2011	Mount Lemmon	Mount Lemmon Survey	·	2.3 km	MPC · JPL
575136	2011 HF_{104}	—	April 24, 2011	Mount Lemmon	Mount Lemmon Survey	VER	2.3 km	MPC · JPL
575137	2011 HG_{105}	—	December 29, 2014	Haleakala	Pan-STARRS 1	·	1.5 km	MPC · JPL
575138	2011 HK_{105}	—	November 29, 2013	Haleakala	Pan-STARRS 1	·	1.5 km	MPC · JPL
575139	2011 HJ_{107}	—	September 29, 2017	Catalina	CSS	·	1.6 km	MPC · JPL
575140	2011 HS_{111}	—	April 30, 2011	Kitt Peak	Spacewatch	·	1.6 km	MPC · JPL
575141	2011 JL_{12}	—	May 8, 2011	Catalina	CSS	·	1.9 km	MPC · JPL
575142	2011 JC_{17}	—	September 11, 2005	Kitt Peak	Spacewatch	·	580 m	MPC · JPL
575143	2011 JF_{19}	—	May 1, 2011	Haleakala	Pan-STARRS 1	·	1.7 km	MPC · JPL
575144	2011 JL_{19}	—	May 1, 2011	Haleakala	Pan-STARRS 1	GEF	790 m	MPC · JPL
575145	2011 JS_{28}	—	April 22, 2007	Mount Lemmon	Mount Lemmon Survey	NYS	1.2 km	MPC · JPL
575146	2011 JT_{28}	—	July 30, 1995	Kitt Peak	Spacewatch	·	570 m	MPC · JPL
575147	2011 JZ_{30}	—	December 25, 2005	Catalina	CSS	·	2.3 km	MPC · JPL
575148	2011 JS_{33}	—	May 8, 2011	Kitt Peak	Spacewatch	·	1.8 km	MPC · JPL
575149	2011 JU_{33}	—	May 9, 2011	Mount Lemmon	Mount Lemmon Survey	·	510 m	MPC · JPL
575150	2011 JA_{34}	—	August 26, 2012	Haleakala	Pan-STARRS 1	·	1.5 km	MPC · JPL
575151	2011 JY_{34}	—	January 28, 2015	Haleakala	Pan-STARRS 1	·	1.4 km	MPC · JPL
575152	2011 JZ_{36}	—	May 9, 2011	Kitt Peak	Spacewatch	·	2.3 km	MPC · JPL
575153	2011 KZ_{3}	—	May 23, 2011	Mount Lemmon	Mount Lemmon Survey	·	590 m	MPC · JPL
575154	2011 KO_{6}	—	September 26, 2003	Apache Point	SDSS Collaboration	·	1.8 km	MPC · JPL
575155	2011 KC_{7}	—	May 24, 2011	Mount Lemmon	Mount Lemmon Survey	·	830 m	MPC · JPL
575156	2011 KR_{9}	—	September 22, 2008	Kitt Peak	Spacewatch	·	2.0 km	MPC · JPL
575157	2011 KL_{13}	—	May 24, 2011	Haleakala	Pan-STARRS 1	H	380 m	MPC · JPL
575158	2011 KF_{14}	—	May 22, 2011	Mount Lemmon	Mount Lemmon Survey	·	1.9 km	MPC · JPL
575159	2011 KD_{17}	—	May 24, 2011	Haleakala	Pan-STARRS 1	·	1.3 km	MPC · JPL
575160	2011 KH_{18}	—	May 24, 2011	Haleakala	Pan-STARRS 1	·	650 m	MPC · JPL
575161	2011 KO_{18}	—	May 24, 2011	Haleakala	Pan-STARRS 1	·	530 m	MPC · JPL
575162	2011 KX_{22}	—	May 21, 2011	Kitt Peak	Spacewatch	H	400 m	MPC · JPL
575163	2011 KY_{26}	—	May 30, 2011	Haleakala	Pan-STARRS 1	·	960 m	MPC · JPL
575164	2011 KM_{29}	—	May 21, 2011	Nogales	M. Schwartz, P. R. Holvorcem	·	620 m	MPC · JPL
575165	2011 KF_{30}	—	October 30, 2008	Kitt Peak	Spacewatch	·	1.8 km	MPC · JPL
575166	2011 KD_{32}	—	May 31, 2011	Mount Lemmon	Mount Lemmon Survey	·	1.0 km	MPC · JPL
575167	2011 KA_{40}	—	May 24, 2011	Haleakala	Pan-STARRS 1	·	720 m	MPC · JPL
575168	2011 KV_{40}	—	March 26, 2006	Mount Lemmon	Mount Lemmon Survey	·	1.5 km	MPC · JPL
575169	2011 KX_{40}	—	September 13, 2007	Mount Lemmon	Mount Lemmon Survey	KOR	1.2 km	MPC · JPL
575170	2011 KE_{44}	—	May 26, 2011	Mount Lemmon	Mount Lemmon Survey	MRX	1.0 km	MPC · JPL
575171	2011 KK_{46}	—	May 24, 2011	Haleakala	Pan-STARRS 1	·	1.5 km	MPC · JPL
575172	2011 KY_{48}	—	May 5, 2011	Mount Lemmon	Mount Lemmon Survey	·	1.5 km	MPC · JPL
575173	2011 KW_{49}	—	May 26, 2011	Mount Lemmon	Mount Lemmon Survey	·	1.7 km	MPC · JPL
575174	2011 KG_{50}	—	May 24, 2011	Mount Lemmon	Mount Lemmon Survey	EUN	900 m	MPC · JPL
575175	2011 KL_{52}	—	January 21, 2015	Haleakala	Pan-STARRS 1	WIT	960 m	MPC · JPL
575176	2011 KZ_{52}	—	April 5, 2014	Haleakala	Pan-STARRS 1	·	500 m	MPC · JPL
575177	2011 KX_{55}	—	May 22, 2011	Mount Lemmon	Mount Lemmon Survey	·	1.5 km	MPC · JPL
575178	2011 KJ_{57}	—	May 26, 2011	Nogales	M. Schwartz, P. R. Holvorcem	·	550 m	MPC · JPL
575179	2011 LG	—	May 6, 2011	Kitt Peak	Spacewatch	H	410 m	MPC · JPL
575180	2011 LQ_{1}	—	June 3, 2011	Mount Lemmon	Mount Lemmon Survey	·	1.7 km	MPC · JPL
575181	2011 LP_{3}	—	May 27, 2011	Kitt Peak	Spacewatch	·	2.0 km	MPC · JPL
575182	2011 LT_{7}	—	June 5, 2011	Kitt Peak	Spacewatch	·	2.2 km	MPC · JPL
575183	2011 LG_{15}	—	June 7, 2011	Mount Lemmon	Mount Lemmon Survey	·	1.7 km	MPC · JPL
575184	2011 LR_{15}	—	May 22, 2011	Mount Lemmon	Mount Lemmon Survey	·	1.6 km	MPC · JPL
575185	2011 LP_{18}	—	June 5, 2011	Andrushivka	Y. Ivaščenko, Kyrylenko, P.	·	1.1 km	MPC · JPL
575186	2011 LV_{18}	—	May 25, 2011	Kitt Peak	Spacewatch	MAR	730 m	MPC · JPL
575187	2011 LW_{20}	—	June 6, 2011	Haleakala	Pan-STARRS 1	H	520 m	MPC · JPL
575188	2011 LL_{21}	—	June 1, 2011	ESA OGS	ESA OGS	·	2.0 km	MPC · JPL
575189	2011 LX_{25}	—	June 7, 2011	Haleakala	Pan-STARRS 1	·	490 m	MPC · JPL
575190	2011 LC_{29}	—	June 9, 2011	Mount Lemmon	Mount Lemmon Survey	·	1.5 km	MPC · JPL
575191	2011 LT_{29}	—	February 26, 2014	Haleakala	Pan-STARRS 1	·	550 m	MPC · JPL
575192	2011 LA_{30}	—	June 3, 2011	Mount Lemmon	Mount Lemmon Survey	·	1.1 km	MPC · JPL
575193	2011 LC_{32}	—	March 17, 2015	Haleakala	Pan-STARRS 1	·	1.1 km	MPC · JPL
575194	2011 LH_{32}	—	May 21, 2015	Haleakala	Pan-STARRS 1	·	960 m	MPC · JPL
575195 Carpineti	2011 LG_{33}	Carpineti	December 6, 2012	Tincana	M. Kusiak, M. Żołnowski	·	1.2 km	MPC · JPL
575196	2011 LJ_{34}	—	June 11, 2011	Mount Lemmon	Mount Lemmon Survey	BRA	1.4 km	MPC · JPL
575197	2011 LL_{34}	—	June 3, 2011	Mount Lemmon	Mount Lemmon Survey	·	2.1 km	MPC · JPL
575198	2011 LM_{34}	—	June 8, 2011	Mount Lemmon	Mount Lemmon Survey	·	1.2 km	MPC · JPL
575199	2011 LQ_{34}	—	June 11, 2011	Mount Lemmon	Mount Lemmon Survey	L5	8.2 km	MPC · JPL
575200	2011 LV_{34}	—	June 5, 2011	Mount Lemmon	Mount Lemmon Survey	(18466)	1.6 km	MPC · JPL

== 575201–575300 ==
back to top

Designation			Discovery			Properties		Ref
Permanent	Provisional	Named after	Date	Site	Discoverer(s)	Category	Diam.	Ref
575201	2011 MB_{1}	—	June 22, 2011	Mount Lemmon	Mount Lemmon Survey	·	1.3 km	MPC · JPL
575202	2011 MJ_{2}	—	October 9, 2008	Mount Lemmon	Mount Lemmon Survey	·	550 m	MPC · JPL
575203	2011 MM_{5}	—	May 30, 2011	Haleakala	Pan-STARRS 1	·	2.2 km	MPC · JPL
575204	2011 MD_{7}	—	June 22, 2011	Kitt Peak	Spacewatch	EUN	1.0 km	MPC · JPL
575205	2011 MW_{11}	—	November 11, 2012	Nogales	M. Schwartz, P. R. Holvorcem	·	3.3 km	MPC · JPL
575206	2011 MA_{12}	—	June 27, 2011	Kitt Peak	Spacewatch	·	1.8 km	MPC · JPL
575207	2011 ME_{13}	—	June 27, 2011	Mount Lemmon	Mount Lemmon Survey	·	1.1 km	MPC · JPL
575208	2011 MH_{13}	—	September 26, 2017	Haleakala	Pan-STARRS 1	·	2.2 km	MPC · JPL
575209	2011 ME_{14}	—	December 3, 2012	Mount Lemmon	Mount Lemmon Survey	·	1.1 km	MPC · JPL
575210	2011 MW_{14}	—	June 29, 2011	Kitt Peak	Spacewatch	·	2.1 km	MPC · JPL
575211	2011 NJ_{2}	—	July 1, 2011	Mount Lemmon	Mount Lemmon Survey	EOS	1.6 km	MPC · JPL
575212	2011 NM_{4}	—	September 17, 2006	Catalina	CSS	·	2.2 km	MPC · JPL
575213	2011 OY_{10}	—	July 25, 2011	Haleakala	Pan-STARRS 1	·	2.0 km	MPC · JPL
575214	2011 OB_{12}	—	July 25, 2011	Haleakala	Pan-STARRS 1	·	540 m	MPC · JPL
575215	2011 OM_{16}	—	July 26, 2011	Haleakala	Pan-STARRS 1	·	1.5 km	MPC · JPL
575216	2011 OZ_{24}	—	July 24, 2011	La Sagra	OAM	·	730 m	MPC · JPL
575217	2011 OJ_{30}	—	June 11, 2011	Mount Lemmon	Mount Lemmon Survey	EUN	830 m	MPC · JPL
575218	2011 OY_{34}	—	March 18, 2010	Kitt Peak	Spacewatch	·	2.4 km	MPC · JPL
575219	2011 OP_{37}	—	August 1, 2011	Haleakala	Pan-STARRS 1	·	530 m	MPC · JPL
575220	2011 OA_{42}	—	July 28, 2011	Haleakala	Pan-STARRS 1	·	2.2 km	MPC · JPL
575221	2011 OY_{44}	—	March 1, 2009	Kitt Peak	Spacewatch	EOS	2.0 km	MPC · JPL
575222	2011 OC_{46}	—	January 1, 2009	Kitt Peak	Spacewatch	·	1.2 km	MPC · JPL
575223	2011 OP_{52}	—	July 21, 2006	Mount Lemmon	Mount Lemmon Survey	·	2.1 km	MPC · JPL
575224	2011 OG_{53}	—	October 19, 2006	Catalina	CSS	TIR	2.2 km	MPC · JPL
575225	2011 OU_{56}	—	October 8, 2008	Mount Lemmon	Mount Lemmon Survey	·	770 m	MPC · JPL
575226	2011 OK_{59}	—	October 7, 2008	Mount Lemmon	Mount Lemmon Survey	·	510 m	MPC · JPL
575227	2011 OP_{59}	—	July 27, 2011	Palomar	Palomar Transient Factory	HNS	1.2 km	MPC · JPL
575228	2011 OV_{59}	—	October 9, 2007	Kitt Peak	Spacewatch	KOR	1.5 km	MPC · JPL
575229	2011 OR_{61}	—	September 8, 2016	Haleakala	Pan-STARRS 1	HNS	900 m	MPC · JPL
575230	2011 OW_{61}	—	July 28, 2011	Haleakala	Pan-STARRS 1	·	2.3 km	MPC · JPL
575231	2011 OM_{64}	—	January 20, 2015	Haleakala	Pan-STARRS 1	EOS	1.6 km	MPC · JPL
575232	2011 OR_{69}	—	February 16, 2015	Haleakala	Pan-STARRS 1	·	1.6 km	MPC · JPL
575233	2011 ON_{70}	—	July 28, 2011	Haleakala	Pan-STARRS 1	L5	6.6 km	MPC · JPL
575234	2011 OZ_{70}	—	July 25, 2011	Haleakala	Pan-STARRS 1	·	1.5 km	MPC · JPL
575235	2011 OC_{71}	—	June 26, 2011	Mount Lemmon	Mount Lemmon Survey	EOS	1.7 km	MPC · JPL
575236	2011 OV_{72}	—	July 28, 2011	Haleakala	Pan-STARRS 1	·	2.1 km	MPC · JPL
575237	2011 OH_{73}	—	July 28, 2011	Haleakala	Pan-STARRS 1	·	1.8 km	MPC · JPL
575238	2011 PJ	—	September 28, 2001	Palomar	NEAT	·	620 m	MPC · JPL
575239	2011 PT_{6}	—	August 4, 2011	Haleakala	Pan-STARRS 1	·	840 m	MPC · JPL
575240	2011 PL_{7}	—	August 6, 2011	Haleakala	Pan-STARRS 1	V	530 m	MPC · JPL
575241	2011 PM_{7}	—	March 1, 2009	Kitt Peak	Spacewatch	·	2.2 km	MPC · JPL
575242	2011 PH_{10}	—	October 29, 2008	Mount Lemmon	Mount Lemmon Survey	·	540 m	MPC · JPL
575243	2011 PU_{15}	—	August 2, 2011	Haleakala	Pan-STARRS 1	L5	6.9 km	MPC · JPL
575244	2011 PV_{16}	—	August 2, 2016	Haleakala	Pan-STARRS 1	BRA	1.3 km	MPC · JPL
575245	2011 PW_{16}	—	December 3, 2012	Mount Lemmon	Mount Lemmon Survey	·	2.1 km	MPC · JPL
575246	2011 PM_{17}	—	July 25, 2000	Kitt Peak	Spacewatch	·	3.1 km	MPC · JPL
575247	2011 PY_{17}	—	October 17, 2017	Mount Lemmon	Mount Lemmon Survey	·	1.5 km	MPC · JPL
575248	2011 PF_{20}	—	September 23, 2017	Haleakala	Pan-STARRS 1	·	1.8 km	MPC · JPL
575249	2011 PV_{21}	—	August 1, 2011	Haleakala	Pan-STARRS 1	·	2.3 km	MPC · JPL
575250	2011 QW	—	August 18, 2011	Haleakala	Pan-STARRS 1	H	450 m	MPC · JPL
575251	2011 QP_{1}	—	December 16, 2007	Catalina	CSS	·	2.4 km	MPC · JPL
575252	2011 QQ_{1}	—	October 17, 2006	Catalina	CSS	TIR	2.4 km	MPC · JPL
575253	2011 QV_{2}	—	August 20, 2011	Pla D'Arguines	R. Ferrando, Ferrando, M.	EUP	3.0 km	MPC · JPL
575254	2011 QL_{3}	—	July 2, 2011	Kitt Peak	Spacewatch	L5	10 km	MPC · JPL
575255	2011 QO_{4}	—	August 17, 2006	Palomar	NEAT	H	380 m	MPC · JPL
575256	2011 QO_{8}	—	September 16, 2006	Catalina	CSS	·	2.0 km	MPC · JPL
575257	2011 QE_{9}	—	August 22, 2011	Charleston	R. Holmes	BRA	1.6 km	MPC · JPL
575258	2011 QU_{9}	—	December 1, 2005	Kitt Peak	Wasserman, L. H., Millis, R. L.	L5	9.3 km	MPC · JPL
575259	2011 QG_{10}	—	August 20, 2011	Haleakala	Pan-STARRS 1	·	2.0 km	MPC · JPL
575260	2011 QC_{12}	—	October 16, 2006	Apache Point	SDSS Collaboration	·	2.5 km	MPC · JPL
575261	2011 QP_{19}	—	August 23, 2011	Haleakala	Pan-STARRS 1	·	640 m	MPC · JPL
575262	2011 QV_{22}	—	July 31, 2001	Palomar	NEAT	·	2.6 km	MPC · JPL
575263	2011 QY_{22}	—	April 29, 2008	Mount Lemmon	Mount Lemmon Survey	L5	6.6 km	MPC · JPL
575264	2011 QJ_{24}	—	August 20, 2011	Haleakala	Pan-STARRS 1	·	530 m	MPC · JPL
575265	2011 QY_{32}	—	August 26, 2011	Kitt Peak	Spacewatch	·	3.2 km	MPC · JPL
575266	2011 QN_{34}	—	September 13, 2002	Palomar	NEAT	·	3.2 km	MPC · JPL
575267	2011 QG_{35}	—	August 26, 2011	Haleakala	Pan-STARRS 1	PHO	810 m	MPC · JPL
575268	2011 QJ_{35}	—	October 15, 2007	Catalina	CSS	EUN	990 m	MPC · JPL
575269	2011 QK_{35}	—	August 26, 2011	Haleakala	Pan-STARRS 1	(2076)	680 m	MPC · JPL
575270	2011 QF_{36}	—	June 8, 2011	Haleakala	Pan-STARRS 1	·	1.7 km	MPC · JPL
575271	2011 QS_{37}	—	August 28, 2011	Eskridge	Dose, E.	KOR	1.5 km	MPC · JPL
575272	2011 QA_{40}	—	August 28, 2011	Dauban	C. Rinner, Kugel, F.	·	2.4 km	MPC · JPL
575273	2011 QZ_{43}	—	October 1, 2008	Mount Lemmon	Mount Lemmon Survey	·	520 m	MPC · JPL
575274	2011 QO_{45}	—	August 23, 2011	Andrushivka	Y. Ivaščenko, Kyrylenko, P.	·	620 m	MPC · JPL
575275	2011 QJ_{46}	—	August 29, 2011	Haleakala	Lister, T.	L5	8.2 km	MPC · JPL
575276	2011 QZ_{46}	—	September 10, 2007	Kitt Peak	Spacewatch	·	870 m	MPC · JPL
575277	2011 QC_{49}	—	August 26, 2011	Haleakala	Pan-STARRS 1	·	550 m	MPC · JPL
575278	2011 QU_{51}	—	September 24, 2008	Kitt Peak	Spacewatch	·	550 m	MPC · JPL
575279	2011 QG_{52}	—	August 27, 2011	Andrushivka	Y. Ivaščenko, Kyrylenko, P.	ADE	1.3 km	MPC · JPL
575280	2011 QV_{52}	—	September 28, 2006	Mount Lemmon	Mount Lemmon Survey	·	1.7 km	MPC · JPL
575281	2011 QC_{55}	—	October 12, 2007	Mount Lemmon	Mount Lemmon Survey	·	1.2 km	MPC · JPL
575282	2011 QE_{55}	—	August 26, 2011	Kitt Peak	Spacewatch	·	560 m	MPC · JPL
575283	2011 QD_{60}	—	September 26, 2006	Moletai	K. Černis, Zdanavicius, J.	·	2.8 km	MPC · JPL
575284	2011 QT_{62}	—	July 29, 2000	Cerro Tololo	Deep Ecliptic Survey	EOS	1.6 km	MPC · JPL
575285	2011 QL_{66}	—	August 26, 2011	Haleakala	Pan-STARRS 1	·	2.6 km	MPC · JPL
575286	2011 QY_{67}	—	August 26, 2000	Cerro Tololo	Deep Ecliptic Survey	EOS	2.4 km	MPC · JPL
575287	2011 QB_{68}	—	August 6, 2004	Palomar	NEAT	·	560 m	MPC · JPL
575288	2011 QW_{68}	—	August 23, 2011	Haleakala	Pan-STARRS 1	NYS	650 m	MPC · JPL
575289	2011 QY_{71}	—	October 7, 1994	Kitt Peak	Spacewatch	·	560 m	MPC · JPL
575290	2011 QN_{73}	—	August 29, 2006	Kitt Peak	Spacewatch	EOS	1.6 km	MPC · JPL
575291	2011 QT_{73}	—	September 28, 2006	Mount Lemmon	Mount Lemmon Survey	·	2.4 km	MPC · JPL
575292	2011 QZ_{73}	—	October 10, 2007	Kitt Peak	Spacewatch	·	1.4 km	MPC · JPL
575293	2011 QT_{74}	—	July 28, 2011	Haleakala	Pan-STARRS 1	·	1.6 km	MPC · JPL
575294	2011 QZ_{76}	—	August 23, 2011	Haleakala	Pan-STARRS 1	·	730 m	MPC · JPL
575295	2011 QB_{78}	—	August 23, 2011	Haleakala	Pan-STARRS 1	·	690 m	MPC · JPL
575296	2011 QZ_{78}	—	January 25, 2009	Kitt Peak	Spacewatch	·	2.8 km	MPC · JPL
575297	2011 QV_{83}	—	August 24, 2011	Haleakala	Pan-STARRS 1	EOS	1.6 km	MPC · JPL
575298	2011 QC_{86}	—	October 24, 2008	Kitt Peak	Spacewatch	·	440 m	MPC · JPL
575299	2011 QE_{86}	—	August 26, 2011	Haleakala	Pan-STARRS 1	TRE	1.8 km	MPC · JPL
575300	2011 QJ_{86}	—	August 26, 2011	Haleakala	Pan-STARRS 1	EUP	2.9 km	MPC · JPL

== 575301–575400 ==
back to top

Designation			Discovery			Properties		Ref
Permanent	Provisional	Named after	Date	Site	Discoverer(s)	Category	Diam.	Ref
575301	2011 QW_{86}	—	July 15, 2005	Mount Lemmon	Mount Lemmon Survey	·	3.3 km	MPC · JPL
575302	2011 QM_{93}	—	August 30, 2011	Haleakala	Pan-STARRS 1	·	2.5 km	MPC · JPL
575303	2011 QZ_{93}	—	August 31, 2011	Haleakala	Pan-STARRS 1	·	2.4 km	MPC · JPL
575304	2011 QV_{98}	—	August 21, 2004	Siding Spring	SSS	·	850 m	MPC · JPL
575305	2011 QD_{101}	—	November 13, 2012	Kitt Peak	Spacewatch	·	2.0 km	MPC · JPL
575306	2011 QF_{101}	—	January 9, 2014	Mount Lemmon	Mount Lemmon Survey	EOS	1.7 km	MPC · JPL
575307	2011 QJ_{101}	—	October 20, 2012	Haleakala	Pan-STARRS 1	EOS	1.7 km	MPC · JPL
575308	2011 QM_{101}	—	August 31, 2011	Haleakala	Pan-STARRS 1	URS	2.5 km	MPC · JPL
575309	2011 QY_{101}	—	June 29, 2016	Haleakala	Pan-STARRS 1	EOS	1.4 km	MPC · JPL
575310	2011 QR_{103}	—	January 30, 2014	Kitt Peak	Spacewatch	·	3.0 km	MPC · JPL
575311	2011 QL_{105}	—	August 1, 2017	Haleakala	Pan-STARRS 1	·	2.4 km	MPC · JPL
575312	2011 QG_{106}	—	August 24, 2011	Siding Spring	SSS	·	750 m	MPC · JPL
575313	2011 QZ_{106}	—	August 11, 2016	Haleakala	Pan-STARRS 1	·	1.5 km	MPC · JPL
575314	2011 QE_{109}	—	August 26, 2011	Kitt Peak	Spacewatch	V	620 m	MPC · JPL
575315	2011 QX_{110}	—	August 24, 2011	Haleakala	Pan-STARRS 1	·	1.4 km	MPC · JPL
575316	2011 QY_{112}	—	August 24, 2011	Haleakala	Pan-STARRS 1	·	2.5 km	MPC · JPL
575317	2011 QS_{113}	—	August 24, 2011	Haleakala	Pan-STARRS 1	·	2.9 km	MPC · JPL
575318	2011 RR_{1}	—	September 2, 2011	Haleakala	Pan-STARRS 1	·	2.3 km	MPC · JPL
575319	2011 RT_{2}	—	October 31, 2005	Mauna Kea	A. Boattini	·	950 m	MPC · JPL
575320	2011 RV_{2}	—	September 2, 2011	Haleakala	Pan-STARRS 1	·	1.7 km	MPC · JPL
575321	2011 RQ_{4}	—	April 9, 2010	Kitt Peak	Spacewatch	·	1.3 km	MPC · JPL
575322	2011 RX_{5}	—	September 5, 2011	Haleakala	Pan-STARRS 1	EOS	1.6 km	MPC · JPL
575323	2011 RE_{8}	—	September 6, 2011	Haleakala	Pan-STARRS 1	·	490 m	MPC · JPL
575324	2011 RR_{9}	—	November 8, 2008	Kitt Peak	Spacewatch	·	520 m	MPC · JPL
575325	2011 RB_{15}	—	September 4, 2011	Haleakala	Pan-STARRS 1	EOS	1.8 km	MPC · JPL
575326	2011 RK_{17}	—	July 5, 2005	Mount Lemmon	Mount Lemmon Survey	·	3.2 km	MPC · JPL
575327	2011 RY_{19}	—	September 19, 1998	Apache Point	SDSS	H	340 m	MPC · JPL
575328	2011 RZ_{21}	—	September 8, 2011	Haleakala	Pan-STARRS 1	·	1.8 km	MPC · JPL
575329	2011 RL_{22}	—	September 4, 2011	Haleakala	Pan-STARRS 1	·	1.9 km	MPC · JPL
575330	2011 RF_{25}	—	November 9, 2015	Mount Lemmon	Mount Lemmon Survey	V	430 m	MPC · JPL
575331	2011 RK_{26}	—	September 8, 2011	Haleakala	Pan-STARRS 1	·	1.4 km	MPC · JPL
575332	2011 RJ_{28}	—	September 4, 2011	Haleakala	Pan-STARRS 1	·	2.4 km	MPC · JPL
575333	2011 RS_{28}	—	September 4, 2011	Haleakala	Pan-STARRS 1	·	1.3 km	MPC · JPL
575334	2011 RV_{28}	—	September 8, 2011	Kitt Peak	Spacewatch	·	2.0 km	MPC · JPL
575335	2011 ST	—	March 12, 2010	Mount Lemmon	Mount Lemmon Survey	·	670 m	MPC · JPL
575336	2011 SU_{2}	—	August 20, 2011	Haleakala	Pan-STARRS 1	·	590 m	MPC · JPL
575337	2011 SJ_{4}	—	September 18, 2011	Mount Lemmon	Mount Lemmon Survey	EUN	950 m	MPC · JPL
575338	2011 SO_{4}	—	December 2, 2005	Mauna Kea	A. Boattini	·	750 m	MPC · JPL
575339	2011 SH_{13}	—	September 19, 2011	Mount Lemmon	Mount Lemmon Survey	·	650 m	MPC · JPL
575340	2011 SQ_{13}	—	September 18, 2011	Catalina	CSS	·	640 m	MPC · JPL
575341	2011 SQ_{15}	—	February 27, 2009	Kitt Peak	Spacewatch	·	2.7 km	MPC · JPL
575342	2011 SS_{17}	—	December 5, 2007	Kitt Peak	Spacewatch	EOS	1.7 km	MPC · JPL
575343	2011 ST_{17}	—	April 11, 2010	Kitt Peak	Spacewatch	·	1.5 km	MPC · JPL
575344	2011 SR_{31}	—	March 8, 2009	Mount Lemmon	Mount Lemmon Survey	·	2.6 km	MPC · JPL
575345	2011 SK_{36}	—	September 27, 2000	Kitt Peak	Spacewatch	·	2.6 km	MPC · JPL
575346	2011 SO_{36}	—	September 20, 2011	Kitt Peak	Spacewatch	(2076)	550 m	MPC · JPL
575347	2011 SR_{37}	—	April 21, 2009	Mount Lemmon	Mount Lemmon Survey	·	2.4 km	MPC · JPL
575348	2011 SC_{38}	—	January 15, 2007	Catalina	CSS	·	2.9 km	MPC · JPL
575349	2011 ST_{38}	—	September 20, 2011	Taunus	Karge, S., R. Kling	·	4.3 km	MPC · JPL
575350	2011 SM_{40}	—	September 21, 2011	Mount Lemmon	Mount Lemmon Survey	·	2.6 km	MPC · JPL
575351	2011 SZ_{41}	—	August 1, 2000	Cerro Tololo	Deep Ecliptic Survey	·	2.4 km	MPC · JPL
575352	2011 SV_{46}	—	May 11, 2010	Mount Lemmon	Mount Lemmon Survey	·	2.0 km	MPC · JPL
575353	2011 SE_{48}	—	October 4, 2004	Kitt Peak	Spacewatch	·	670 m	MPC · JPL
575354	2011 SL_{48}	—	October 4, 1997	Kitt Peak	Spacewatch	·	600 m	MPC · JPL
575355	2011 SS_{52}	—	September 23, 2011	Mount Lemmon	Mount Lemmon Survey	THM	1.8 km	MPC · JPL
575356	2011 SE_{53}	—	September 23, 2011	Mount Lemmon	Mount Lemmon Survey	·	2.3 km	MPC · JPL
575357	2011 SV_{54}	—	July 31, 2000	Cerro Tololo	Deep Ecliptic Survey	·	640 m	MPC · JPL
575358	2011 SO_{55}	—	September 23, 2011	Haleakala	Pan-STARRS 1	·	1.9 km	MPC · JPL
575359	2011 SG_{60}	—	September 19, 2011	Haleakala	Pan-STARRS 1	EOS	1.4 km	MPC · JPL
575360	2011 SQ_{60}	—	October 11, 2006	Palomar	NEAT	EOS	1.6 km	MPC · JPL
575361	2011 SB_{72}	—	September 4, 2011	Haleakala	Pan-STARRS 1	·	1.0 km	MPC · JPL
575362	2011 SX_{73}	—	October 21, 2006	Kitt Peak	Spacewatch	·	2.7 km	MPC · JPL
575363	2011 SV_{75}	—	September 20, 2011	Mount Lemmon	Mount Lemmon Survey	·	1.7 km	MPC · JPL
575364	2011 SA_{77}	—	March 19, 2010	Mount Lemmon	Mount Lemmon Survey	·	780 m	MPC · JPL
575365	2011 ST_{77}	—	September 20, 2011	Mount Lemmon	Mount Lemmon Survey	·	1.4 km	MPC · JPL
575366	2011 SC_{82}	—	September 4, 2011	Haleakala	Pan-STARRS 1	EOS	1.4 km	MPC · JPL
575367	2011 SF_{85}	—	July 31, 2005	Palomar	NEAT	EOS	2.0 km	MPC · JPL
575368	2011 SH_{88}	—	September 22, 2011	Kitt Peak	Spacewatch	·	2.0 km	MPC · JPL
575369	2011 SZ_{100}	—	November 2, 2007	Mount Lemmon	Mount Lemmon Survey	WIT	940 m	MPC · JPL
575370	2011 SF_{105}	—	November 2, 2006	Kitt Peak	Spacewatch	·	1.3 km	MPC · JPL
575371	2011 SF_{109}	—	September 2, 2011	Haleakala	Pan-STARRS 1	·	2.0 km	MPC · JPL
575372	2011 SX_{112}	—	September 19, 2011	Sandlot	G. Hug	·	680 m	MPC · JPL
575373	2011 SU_{117}	—	September 23, 2011	Charleston	R. Holmes	·	3.2 km	MPC · JPL
575374	2011 SK_{122}	—	January 15, 2009	Kitt Peak	Spacewatch	·	980 m	MPC · JPL
575375	2011 SW_{127}	—	September 20, 2011	Kitt Peak	Spacewatch	·	2.2 km	MPC · JPL
575376	2011 SA_{128}	—	September 13, 2005	Kitt Peak	Spacewatch	·	2.9 km	MPC · JPL
575377	2011 SK_{133}	—	September 20, 2011	Kitt Peak	Spacewatch	AGN	860 m	MPC · JPL
575378	2011 SM_{133}	—	September 24, 2011	Kitt Peak	Spacewatch	THM	2.1 km	MPC · JPL
575379	2011 SD_{134}	—	September 24, 2011	Haleakala	Pan-STARRS 1	·	2.3 km	MPC · JPL
575380	2011 SY_{134}	—	September 18, 2011	Mount Lemmon	Mount Lemmon Survey	·	2.6 km	MPC · JPL
575381	2011 SM_{135}	—	October 18, 2001	Palomar	NEAT	·	640 m	MPC · JPL
575382	2011 SZ_{136}	—	September 4, 2011	Haleakala	Pan-STARRS 1	·	1.8 km	MPC · JPL
575383	2011 SG_{142}	—	September 23, 2011	Haleakala	Pan-STARRS 1	·	1.8 km	MPC · JPL
575384	2011 SY_{145}	—	November 7, 2007	Kitt Peak	Spacewatch	·	1.5 km	MPC · JPL
575385	2011 SC_{146}	—	September 4, 2011	Haleakala	Pan-STARRS 1	EOS	1.7 km	MPC · JPL
575386	2011 ST_{148}	—	September 4, 2011	Haleakala	Pan-STARRS 1	·	2.2 km	MPC · JPL
575387	2011 SX_{149}	—	September 26, 2011	Haleakala	Pan-STARRS 1	·	1.6 km	MPC · JPL
575388	2011 SD_{150}	—	September 26, 2011	Haleakala	Pan-STARRS 1	THM	2.0 km	MPC · JPL
575389	2011 SF_{152}	—	September 26, 2011	Haleakala	Pan-STARRS 1	·	2.7 km	MPC · JPL
575390	2011 SQ_{154}	—	May 12, 2010	Mount Lemmon	Mount Lemmon Survey	·	1.6 km	MPC · JPL
575391	2011 SO_{157}	—	September 17, 2006	Kitt Peak	Spacewatch	EOS	1.8 km	MPC · JPL
575392	2011 SJ_{159}	—	March 11, 2002	Palomar	NEAT	·	3.0 km	MPC · JPL
575393	2011 SO_{159}	—	September 23, 2011	Kitt Peak	Spacewatch	·	670 m	MPC · JPL
575394	2011 SK_{161}	—	December 19, 2007	Mount Lemmon	Mount Lemmon Survey	EOS	1.8 km	MPC · JPL
575395	2011 SE_{164}	—	January 29, 2009	Kitt Peak	Spacewatch	NYS	740 m	MPC · JPL
575396	2011 SS_{170}	—	September 28, 2011	Mount Lemmon	Mount Lemmon Survey	·	600 m	MPC · JPL
575397	2011 SK_{174}	—	March 17, 2009	Bergisch Gladbach	W. Bickel	·	2.7 km	MPC · JPL
575398	2011 SH_{176}	—	September 29, 2011	Mount Lemmon	Mount Lemmon Survey	·	2.1 km	MPC · JPL
575399	2011 SW_{178}	—	February 9, 2008	Mount Lemmon	Mount Lemmon Survey	EOS	1.8 km	MPC · JPL
575400	2011 SL_{181}	—	September 26, 2011	Kitt Peak	Spacewatch	EOS	1.7 km	MPC · JPL

== 575401–575500 ==
back to top

Designation			Discovery			Properties		Ref
Permanent	Provisional	Named after	Date	Site	Discoverer(s)	Category	Diam.	Ref
575401	2011 SP_{182}	—	November 1, 2000	Socorro	LINEAR	·	1.2 km	MPC · JPL
575402	2011 SD_{188}	—	September 30, 2006	Kitt Peak	Spacewatch	·	1.8 km	MPC · JPL
575403	2011 SD_{193}	—	September 26, 2011	Mount Lemmon	Mount Lemmon Survey	·	2.5 km	MPC · JPL
575404	2011 SR_{194}	—	December 20, 2007	Mount Lemmon	Mount Lemmon Survey	·	2.0 km	MPC · JPL
575405	2011 SZ_{194}	—	September 20, 2011	Haleakala	Pan-STARRS 1	·	1.9 km	MPC · JPL
575406	2011 SR_{197}	—	September 18, 2011	Mount Lemmon	Mount Lemmon Survey	·	570 m	MPC · JPL
575407	2011 SB_{198}	—	September 18, 2011	Mount Lemmon	Mount Lemmon Survey	·	2.7 km	MPC · JPL
575408	2011 SH_{199}	—	October 3, 2006	Mount Lemmon	Mount Lemmon Survey	·	2.3 km	MPC · JPL
575409	2011 SU_{203}	—	September 20, 2011	Kitt Peak	Spacewatch	·	2.7 km	MPC · JPL
575410	2011 SE_{206}	—	September 15, 2007	Mount Lemmon	Mount Lemmon Survey	·	1.1 km	MPC · JPL
575411	2011 SC_{211}	—	October 2, 2006	Mount Lemmon	Mount Lemmon Survey	·	2.1 km	MPC · JPL
575412	2011 SN_{213}	—	September 21, 2011	Kitt Peak	Spacewatch	·	500 m	MPC · JPL
575413	2011 SJ_{214}	—	September 21, 2011	Haleakala	Pan-STARRS 1	·	1.8 km	MPC · JPL
575414	2011 SZ_{215}	—	August 23, 2011	Haleakala	Pan-STARRS 1	·	2.3 km	MPC · JPL
575415	2011 SH_{225}	—	September 29, 2011	Mount Lemmon	Mount Lemmon Survey	BRA	1.4 km	MPC · JPL
575416	2011 SJ_{226}	—	September 23, 2011	Kitt Peak	Spacewatch	·	820 m	MPC · JPL
575417	2011 SF_{227}	—	September 29, 2011	Mount Lemmon	Mount Lemmon Survey	V	610 m	MPC · JPL
575418	2011 SN_{227}	—	September 29, 2011	Mount Lemmon	Mount Lemmon Survey	·	2.1 km	MPC · JPL
575419	2011 SZ_{228}	—	September 29, 2011	Les Engarouines	L. Bernasconi	·	2.2 km	MPC · JPL
575420	2011 SQ_{233}	—	July 30, 2000	Cerro Tololo	Deep Ecliptic Survey	·	1.9 km	MPC · JPL
575421	2011 SA_{238}	—	September 26, 2006	Mount Lemmon	Mount Lemmon Survey	·	1.9 km	MPC · JPL
575422	2011 SK_{240}	—	September 26, 2011	Mount Lemmon	Mount Lemmon Survey	EOS	1.3 km	MPC · JPL
575423	2011 SU_{243}	—	September 26, 2011	Haleakala	Pan-STARRS 1	·	1.4 km	MPC · JPL
575424	2011 SP_{244}	—	December 29, 2008	Kitt Peak	Spacewatch	·	700 m	MPC · JPL
575425	2011 SG_{246}	—	September 29, 2011	Mount Lemmon	Mount Lemmon Survey	·	1.9 km	MPC · JPL
575426	2011 SQ_{246}	—	August 29, 2005	Kitt Peak	Spacewatch	(8737)	2.5 km	MPC · JPL
575427	2011 ST_{246}	—	October 30, 2017	Haleakala	Pan-STARRS 1	EOS	1.3 km	MPC · JPL
575428	2011 SO_{248}	—	July 31, 2005	Palomar	NEAT	·	3.1 km	MPC · JPL
575429	2011 SD_{251}	—	September 25, 2011	Haleakala	Pan-STARRS 1	·	1.6 km	MPC · JPL
575430	2011 SY_{251}	—	September 26, 2011	Mount Lemmon	Mount Lemmon Survey	EOS	1.5 km	MPC · JPL
575431	2011 SJ_{253}	—	July 29, 2005	Palomar	NEAT	·	2.9 km	MPC · JPL
575432	2011 SU_{254}	—	September 21, 2011	Kitt Peak	Spacewatch	·	1.1 km	MPC · JPL
575433	2011 SV_{255}	—	September 20, 2011	Mount Lemmon	Mount Lemmon Survey	·	750 m	MPC · JPL
575434	2011 SX_{262}	—	March 15, 2004	Kitt Peak	Spacewatch	·	2.6 km	MPC · JPL
575435	2011 SN_{265}	—	September 20, 2011	Kitt Peak	Spacewatch	NYS	680 m	MPC · JPL
575436	2011 SM_{266}	—	September 20, 2011	Haleakala	Pan-STARRS 1	L5	7.4 km	MPC · JPL
575437	2011 SD_{268}	—	September 4, 2011	Haleakala	Pan-STARRS 1	·	2.2 km	MPC · JPL
575438	2011 SA_{273}	—	October 1, 2000	Socorro	LINEAR	TIR	3.2 km	MPC · JPL
575439	2011 SO_{273}	—	September 22, 2011	Kitt Peak	Spacewatch	·	980 m	MPC · JPL
575440	2011 SX_{275}	—	August 13, 2006	Palomar	NEAT	·	2.2 km	MPC · JPL
575441	2011 SF_{278}	—	September 20, 2011	Mount Lemmon	Mount Lemmon Survey	·	2.9 km	MPC · JPL
575442	2011 SO_{278}	—	September 19, 2011	Haleakala	Pan-STARRS 1	EOS	1.3 km	MPC · JPL
575443	2011 SL_{280}	—	September 28, 2011	Kitt Peak	Spacewatch	·	2.4 km	MPC · JPL
575444	2011 SS_{280}	—	September 30, 2006	Mount Lemmon	Mount Lemmon Survey	·	2.2 km	MPC · JPL
575445	2011 SP_{281}	—	September 23, 2011	Haleakala	Pan-STARRS 1	·	1.3 km	MPC · JPL
575446	2011 SY_{282}	—	April 28, 2009	Kitt Peak	Spacewatch	EOS	1.6 km	MPC · JPL
575447	2011 SH_{283}	—	September 29, 2011	Mount Lemmon	Mount Lemmon Survey	·	740 m	MPC · JPL
575448	2011 SL_{284}	—	April 6, 2014	Mount Lemmon	Mount Lemmon Survey	BRA	1.5 km	MPC · JPL
575449	2011 SG_{285}	—	September 19, 2011	Mount Lemmon	Mount Lemmon Survey	L4	10 km	MPC · JPL
575450	2011 SM_{285}	—	January 30, 2014	Kitt Peak	Spacewatch	·	1.7 km	MPC · JPL
575451	2011 SC_{288}	—	September 20, 2011	Haleakala	Pan-STARRS 1	EOS	1.3 km	MPC · JPL
575452	2011 SQ_{295}	—	August 26, 2016	Haleakala	Pan-STARRS 1	EOS	1.5 km	MPC · JPL
575453	2011 ST_{295}	—	September 27, 2011	Mount Lemmon	Mount Lemmon Survey	V	680 m	MPC · JPL
575454	2011 SE_{296}	—	September 20, 2011	Kitt Peak	Spacewatch	·	500 m	MPC · JPL
575455	2011 SQ_{296}	—	September 24, 2017	Haleakala	Pan-STARRS 1	·	2.1 km	MPC · JPL
575456	2011 SR_{297}	—	September 30, 2017	Haleakala	Pan-STARRS 1	·	2.0 km	MPC · JPL
575457	2011 SJ_{299}	—	September 24, 2011	Haleakala	Pan-STARRS 1	·	1.2 km	MPC · JPL
575458	2011 SR_{302}	—	September 29, 2011	Mount Lemmon	Mount Lemmon Survey	EOS	1.5 km	MPC · JPL
575459	2011 SV_{303}	—	September 26, 2011	Haleakala	Pan-STARRS 1	·	1.7 km	MPC · JPL
575460	2011 SM_{304}	—	September 26, 2011	Mount Lemmon	Mount Lemmon Survey	·	1.7 km	MPC · JPL
575461	2011 SV_{306}	—	September 18, 2011	Mount Lemmon	Mount Lemmon Survey	·	1.6 km	MPC · JPL
575462	2011 SY_{306}	—	September 27, 2011	Mount Lemmon	Mount Lemmon Survey	·	2.6 km	MPC · JPL
575463	2011 SY_{307}	—	September 28, 2011	Mount Lemmon	Mount Lemmon Survey	EOS	1.6 km	MPC · JPL
575464	2011 SD_{308}	—	September 24, 2011	Mount Lemmon	Mount Lemmon Survey	·	2.0 km	MPC · JPL
575465	2011 SO_{308}	—	September 23, 2011	Haleakala	Pan-STARRS 1	·	2.2 km	MPC · JPL
575466	2011 SZ_{308}	—	September 29, 2011	Mount Lemmon	Mount Lemmon Survey	·	2.2 km	MPC · JPL
575467	2011 SL_{309}	—	September 23, 2011	Mount Lemmon	Mount Lemmon Survey	·	1.7 km	MPC · JPL
575468	2011 SP_{309}	—	September 25, 2011	Haleakala	Pan-STARRS 1	·	1.4 km	MPC · JPL
575469	2011 SW_{309}	—	September 23, 2011	Mount Lemmon	Mount Lemmon Survey	·	2.1 km	MPC · JPL
575470	2011 SY_{309}	—	September 29, 2011	Mount Lemmon	Mount Lemmon Survey	·	1.8 km	MPC · JPL
575471	2011 SV_{310}	—	September 29, 2011	Kitt Peak	Spacewatch	·	2.9 km	MPC · JPL
575472	2011 SW_{310}	—	September 29, 2011	Kitt Peak	Spacewatch	SYL	3.0 km	MPC · JPL
575473	2011 SZ_{310}	—	September 27, 2011	Mount Lemmon	Mount Lemmon Survey	·	2.5 km	MPC · JPL
575474	2011 SA_{311}	—	September 23, 2011	Haleakala	Pan-STARRS 1	·	940 m	MPC · JPL
575475	2011 SR_{311}	—	September 24, 2011	Haleakala	Pan-STARRS 1	·	2.8 km	MPC · JPL
575476	2011 SV_{311}	—	September 24, 2011	Haleakala	Pan-STARRS 1	·	2.3 km	MPC · JPL
575477	2011 SX_{311}	—	September 24, 2011	Mount Lemmon	Mount Lemmon Survey	·	1.9 km	MPC · JPL
575478	2011 SY_{311}	—	September 30, 2011	Kitt Peak	Spacewatch	·	1.6 km	MPC · JPL
575479	2011 SA_{312}	—	September 19, 2011	Haleakala	Pan-STARRS 1	EOS	1.6 km	MPC · JPL
575480	2011 SK_{312}	—	September 27, 2011	Mount Lemmon	Mount Lemmon Survey	·	2.4 km	MPC · JPL
575481	2011 SN_{312}	—	September 26, 2011	Haleakala	Pan-STARRS 1	·	1.7 km	MPC · JPL
575482	2011 SE_{317}	—	September 29, 2011	Mount Lemmon	Mount Lemmon Survey	·	2.1 km	MPC · JPL
575483	2011 SK_{318}	—	September 27, 2011	Mount Lemmon	Mount Lemmon Survey	·	1.6 km	MPC · JPL
575484	2011 SN_{320}	—	September 19, 2011	Haleakala	Pan-STARRS 1	EOS	1.7 km	MPC · JPL
575485	2011 SR_{320}	—	September 24, 2011	Haleakala	Pan-STARRS 1	·	2.3 km	MPC · JPL
575486	2011 SE_{323}	—	September 21, 2011	Mount Lemmon	Mount Lemmon Survey	·	1.9 km	MPC · JPL
575487	2011 SN_{323}	—	September 23, 2011	Haleakala	Pan-STARRS 1	·	2.3 km	MPC · JPL
575488	2011 SZ_{326}	—	September 24, 2011	Haleakala	Pan-STARRS 1	·	2.3 km	MPC · JPL
575489	2011 SH_{328}	—	April 9, 2010	WISE	WISE	·	1.3 km	MPC · JPL
575490	2011 TF_{1}	—	January 19, 2002	Anderson Mesa	LONEOS	PHO	1.0 km	MPC · JPL
575491	2011 TC_{9}	—	June 11, 2011	Haleakala	Pan-STARRS 1	·	750 m	MPC · JPL
575492	2011 TT_{9}	—	October 4, 2011	Črni Vrh	Zakrajsek, J.	·	2.8 km	MPC · JPL
575493	2011 TW_{9}	—	October 2, 2011	Cerro Burek	Burek, Cerro	V	670 m	MPC · JPL
575494	2011 TD_{10}	—	January 18, 2002	Anderson Mesa	LONEOS	H	620 m	MPC · JPL
575495	2011 TF_{10}	—	November 20, 2006	Kitt Peak	Spacewatch	TIR	2.9 km	MPC · JPL
575496	2011 TW_{10}	—	September 26, 2011	Haleakala	Pan-STARRS 1	(2076)	500 m	MPC · JPL
575497	2011 TR_{11}	—	October 3, 2011	XuYi	PMO NEO Survey Program	·	600 m	MPC · JPL
575498 Lampérthgyula	2011 TW_{12}	Lampérthgyula	October 5, 2011	Piszkéstető	K. Sárneczky, T. Szalai	·	2.9 km	MPC · JPL
575499	2011 TZ_{17}	—	August 31, 2005	Anderson Mesa	LONEOS	·	3.1 km	MPC · JPL
575500	2011 TJ_{19}	—	September 8, 2011	Kitt Peak	Spacewatch	·	1.7 km	MPC · JPL

== 575501–575600 ==
back to top

Designation			Discovery			Properties		Ref
Permanent	Provisional	Named after	Date	Site	Discoverer(s)	Category	Diam.	Ref
575501	2011 TQ_{19}	—	September 26, 2011	Mount Lemmon	Mount Lemmon Survey	·	1.5 km	MPC · JPL
575502	2011 TT_{20}	—	October 5, 2011	Piszkéstető	K. Sárneczky	AGN	1.1 km	MPC · JPL
575503	2011 UQ_{2}	—	October 18, 2011	Haleakala	Pan-STARRS 1	H	500 m	MPC · JPL
575504	2011 UW_{2}	—	September 23, 2011	Kitt Peak	Spacewatch	V	670 m	MPC · JPL
575505	2011 UJ_{3}	—	October 1, 2011	Kitt Peak	Spacewatch	·	730 m	MPC · JPL
575506	2011 UD_{12}	—	August 6, 2005	Palomar	NEAT	·	2.8 km	MPC · JPL
575507	2011 UT_{13}	—	October 17, 2011	Kitt Peak	Spacewatch	·	1.5 km	MPC · JPL
575508	2011 UH_{18}	—	September 22, 2011	Kitt Peak	Spacewatch	·	1.7 km	MPC · JPL
575509	2011 UX_{24}	—	August 8, 2002	Palomar	NEAT	MIS	1.8 km	MPC · JPL
575510	2011 UK_{28}	—	October 17, 2011	Kitt Peak	Spacewatch	·	2.3 km	MPC · JPL
575511 Bükk	2011 US_{31}	Bükk	October 18, 2011	Piszkéstető	K. Sárneczky, A. Szing	·	2.5 km	MPC · JPL
575512	2011 UV_{32}	—	December 21, 2008	Kitt Peak	Spacewatch	·	810 m	MPC · JPL
575513	2011 UJ_{34}	—	September 22, 2004	Kitt Peak	Spacewatch	·	780 m	MPC · JPL
575514	2011 UP_{39}	—	September 24, 2011	Haleakala	Pan-STARRS 1	LIX	3.2 km	MPC · JPL
575515	2011 UA_{42}	—	October 4, 2006	Mount Lemmon	Mount Lemmon Survey	·	2.7 km	MPC · JPL
575516	2011 UA_{43}	—	November 16, 2006	Bergisch Gladbach	W. Bickel	EOS	1.8 km	MPC · JPL
575517	2011 UJ_{44}	—	October 8, 2004	Kitt Peak	Spacewatch	·	730 m	MPC · JPL
575518	2011 UQ_{48}	—	September 21, 2011	Mount Lemmon	Mount Lemmon Survey	EOS	1.7 km	MPC · JPL
575519	2011 UL_{55}	—	December 20, 2006	Palomar	NEAT	·	2.2 km	MPC · JPL
575520	2011 UN_{64}	—	November 12, 2006	Mount Lemmon	Mount Lemmon Survey	·	2.1 km	MPC · JPL
575521	2011 UB_{66}	—	October 20, 2011	Mount Lemmon	Mount Lemmon Survey	·	1.2 km	MPC · JPL
575522	2011 UE_{66}	—	October 3, 2006	Mount Lemmon	Mount Lemmon Survey	EOS	1.6 km	MPC · JPL
575523	2011 UL_{67}	—	October 20, 2011	Mount Lemmon	Mount Lemmon Survey	·	2.4 km	MPC · JPL
575524	2011 UP_{67}	—	February 13, 2009	Calar Alto	F. Hormuth, Datson, J. C.	·	680 m	MPC · JPL
575525	2011 UW_{69}	—	June 15, 2005	Mount Lemmon	Mount Lemmon Survey	·	2.0 km	MPC · JPL
575526	2011 UH_{70}	—	October 21, 2011	Piszkéstető	K. Sárneczky	V	550 m	MPC · JPL
575527	2011 UT_{70}	—	October 22, 2011	Mount Lemmon	Mount Lemmon Survey	·	1.4 km	MPC · JPL
575528	2011 UF_{71}	—	October 22, 2011	Mount Lemmon	Mount Lemmon Survey	·	1.5 km	MPC · JPL
575529	2011 UM_{74}	—	October 7, 2004	Anderson Mesa	LONEOS	·	720 m	MPC · JPL
575530	2011 UQ_{74}	—	July 26, 2005	Palomar	NEAT	·	2.6 km	MPC · JPL
575531	2011 UQ_{75}	—	August 30, 2005	Kitt Peak	Spacewatch	·	2.8 km	MPC · JPL
575532	2011 UH_{77}	—	October 19, 2011	Kitt Peak	Spacewatch	V	490 m	MPC · JPL
575533	2011 UG_{78}	—	March 20, 2010	Kitt Peak	Spacewatch	(2076)	800 m	MPC · JPL
575534	2011 UX_{78}	—	October 19, 2011	Kitt Peak	Spacewatch	·	2.5 km	MPC · JPL
575535	2011 UC_{79}	—	October 23, 2004	Kitt Peak	Spacewatch	·	700 m	MPC · JPL
575536	2011 UR_{81}	—	September 23, 2011	Mount Lemmon	Mount Lemmon Survey	·	1.6 km	MPC · JPL
575537	2011 UW_{82}	—	October 6, 2011	Črni Vrh	Skvarč, J.	·	1.9 km	MPC · JPL
575538	2011 UF_{85}	—	October 19, 2011	Kitt Peak	Spacewatch	·	3.2 km	MPC · JPL
575539	2011 UO_{88}	—	January 14, 2002	Palomar	NEAT	·	2.6 km	MPC · JPL
575540	2011 UH_{92}	—	October 18, 2011	Kitt Peak	Spacewatch	·	2.5 km	MPC · JPL
575541	2011 UE_{93}	—	October 18, 2011	Mount Lemmon	Mount Lemmon Survey	·	890 m	MPC · JPL
575542	2011 UN_{95}	—	October 19, 2011	Mount Lemmon	Mount Lemmon Survey	critical	480 m	MPC · JPL
575543	2011 UR_{95}	—	October 19, 2011	Mount Lemmon	Mount Lemmon Survey	EOS	1.5 km	MPC · JPL
575544	2011 UP_{97}	—	October 21, 2006	Kitt Peak	Spacewatch	·	2.0 km	MPC · JPL
575545	2011 UT_{99}	—	October 20, 2011	Kitt Peak	Spacewatch	EOS	1.9 km	MPC · JPL
575546	2011 UC_{100}	—	March 5, 2002	Apache Point	SDSS Collaboration	·	2.7 km	MPC · JPL
575547	2011 UE_{101}	—	October 20, 2011	Mount Lemmon	Mount Lemmon Survey	·	860 m	MPC · JPL
575548	2011 UZ_{105}	—	October 22, 2011	Mount Lemmon	Mount Lemmon Survey	MAS	490 m	MPC · JPL
575549	2011 UE_{106}	—	April 14, 2010	Mount Lemmon	Mount Lemmon Survey	PHO	800 m	MPC · JPL
575550	2011 UQ_{106}	—	October 5, 2011	Piszkéstető	K. Sárneczky	·	1.7 km	MPC · JPL
575551	2011 US_{108}	—	November 16, 2006	Catalina	CSS	H	530 m	MPC · JPL
575552	2011 UO_{109}	—	October 23, 2011	Haleakala	Pan-STARRS 1	H	490 m	MPC · JPL
575553	2011 UE_{111}	—	February 12, 2008	Mount Lemmon	Mount Lemmon Survey	EOS	1.8 km	MPC · JPL
575554	2011 UY_{111}	—	October 4, 2006	Mount Lemmon	Mount Lemmon Survey	EOS	1.4 km	MPC · JPL
575555	2011 UQ_{112}	—	August 23, 2007	Kitt Peak	Spacewatch	NYS	820 m	MPC · JPL
575556	2011 UC_{116}	—	October 11, 2001	Palomar	NEAT	·	2.2 km	MPC · JPL
575557	2011 UG_{116}	—	October 20, 2006	Palomar	NEAT	·	1.7 km	MPC · JPL
575558	2011 UL_{118}	—	September 22, 2011	Kitt Peak	Spacewatch	EUN	850 m	MPC · JPL
575559	2011 UO_{119}	—	October 18, 2011	Mount Lemmon	Mount Lemmon Survey	·	790 m	MPC · JPL
575560	2011 UH_{120}	—	November 3, 2000	Kitt Peak	Spacewatch	·	2.9 km	MPC · JPL
575561	2011 UW_{120}	—	September 26, 2011	Kitt Peak	Spacewatch	·	1.0 km	MPC · JPL
575562	2011 UN_{121}	—	November 23, 2006	Mount Lemmon	Mount Lemmon Survey	·	2.1 km	MPC · JPL
575563	2011 UA_{122}	—	October 19, 2006	Kitt Peak	Deep Ecliptic Survey	THM	1.9 km	MPC · JPL
575564	2011 UG_{122}	—	September 26, 2011	Haleakala	Pan-STARRS 1	V	600 m	MPC · JPL
575565	2011 UH_{124}	—	October 20, 2011	Mount Lemmon	Mount Lemmon Survey	·	640 m	MPC · JPL
575566	2011 UQ_{128}	—	October 20, 2011	Kitt Peak	Spacewatch	·	2.2 km	MPC · JPL
575567	2011 UP_{129}	—	October 21, 2011	Mount Lemmon	Mount Lemmon Survey	GEF	900 m	MPC · JPL
575568	2011 UK_{130}	—	September 20, 2011	Kitt Peak	Spacewatch	EOS	1.4 km	MPC · JPL
575569	2011 UH_{132}	—	August 29, 2005	Kitt Peak	Spacewatch	·	2.1 km	MPC · JPL
575570	2011 UW_{132}	—	October 23, 2004	Kitt Peak	Spacewatch	(2076)	920 m	MPC · JPL
575571	2011 UG_{135}	—	October 19, 2011	Kitt Peak	Spacewatch	V	600 m	MPC · JPL
575572	2011 US_{137}	—	October 21, 2011	Kitt Peak	Spacewatch	EOS	2.0 km	MPC · JPL
575573	2011 UT_{137}	—	October 21, 2011	Kitt Peak	Spacewatch	·	2.6 km	MPC · JPL
575574	2011 UQ_{138}	—	October 21, 2011	Piszkéstető	K. Sárneczky	V	600 m	MPC · JPL
575575	2011 UJ_{141}	—	July 3, 2005	Palomar	NEAT	EOS	2.7 km	MPC · JPL
575576	2011 UU_{144}	—	October 24, 2011	Kitt Peak	Spacewatch	·	1.1 km	MPC · JPL
575577	2011 UA_{147}	—	October 24, 2011	Haleakala	Pan-STARRS 1	·	1.1 km	MPC · JPL
575578	2011 UU_{148}	—	October 22, 2011	Kitt Peak	Spacewatch	·	2.5 km	MPC · JPL
575579	2011 UY_{149}	—	September 4, 2011	Haleakala	Pan-STARRS 1	·	2.1 km	MPC · JPL
575580	2011 UE_{150}	—	November 19, 2008	Kitt Peak	Spacewatch	·	710 m	MPC · JPL
575581	2011 UH_{153}	—	March 20, 1999	Apache Point	SDSS Collaboration	·	820 m	MPC · JPL
575582	2011 UO_{153}	—	August 18, 2004	La Palma-NEON	Palma-NEON, La	·	910 m	MPC · JPL
575583	2011 UL_{156}	—	October 24, 2011	Mount Lemmon	Mount Lemmon Survey	·	2.0 km	MPC · JPL
575584	2011 UV_{156}	—	August 26, 2005	Palomar	NEAT	EOS	1.9 km	MPC · JPL
575585	2011 UX_{159}	—	January 31, 2009	Mount Lemmon	Mount Lemmon Survey	·	580 m	MPC · JPL
575586	2011 UE_{161}	—	February 13, 2002	Apache Point	SDSS Collaboration	·	880 m	MPC · JPL
575587	2011 US_{162}	—	October 24, 2011	Mount Lemmon	Mount Lemmon Survey	VER	2.5 km	MPC · JPL
575588	2011 UK_{163}	—	October 19, 2011	Kitt Peak	Spacewatch	V	650 m	MPC · JPL
575589	2011 UL_{167}	—	March 26, 2006	Kitt Peak	Spacewatch	·	1.1 km	MPC · JPL
575590	2011 UM_{168}	—	September 2, 2011	Haleakala	Pan-STARRS 1	·	2.5 km	MPC · JPL
575591	2011 UW_{171}	—	October 21, 2011	Haleakala	Pan-STARRS 1	V	610 m	MPC · JPL
575592	2011 UY_{171}	—	October 21, 2011	Haleakala	Pan-STARRS 1	·	2.6 km	MPC · JPL
575593	2011 UM_{174}	—	October 25, 2005	Mount Lemmon	Mount Lemmon Survey	·	2.6 km	MPC · JPL
575594	2011 UD_{177}	—	August 30, 2005	Palomar	NEAT	·	3.2 km	MPC · JPL
575595	2011 UP_{178}	—	October 24, 2011	Kitt Peak	Spacewatch	VER	2.2 km	MPC · JPL
575596	2011 UX_{179}	—	October 5, 2005	Catalina	CSS	EOS	2.3 km	MPC · JPL
575597	2011 UH_{181}	—	August 26, 2005	Palomar	NEAT	EOS	2.5 km	MPC · JPL
575598	2011 UV_{181}	—	October 20, 2011	Mount Lemmon	Mount Lemmon Survey	(2076)	820 m	MPC · JPL
575599	2011 UA_{182}	—	January 9, 2002	Whipple	T. B. Spahr, Schroedter, M.	·	810 m	MPC · JPL
575600	2011 UN_{195}	—	October 21, 2011	Kitt Peak	Spacewatch	·	2.3 km	MPC · JPL

== 575601–575700 ==
back to top

Designation			Discovery			Properties		Ref
Permanent	Provisional	Named after	Date	Site	Discoverer(s)	Category	Diam.	Ref
575601	2011 UW_{195}	—	October 21, 2011	Kitt Peak	Spacewatch	·	2.0 km	MPC · JPL
575602	2011 UX_{195}	—	April 8, 2003	Kitt Peak	Spacewatch	·	2.4 km	MPC · JPL
575603	2011 UH_{196}	—	October 21, 2011	Kitt Peak	Spacewatch	V	510 m	MPC · JPL
575604	2011 UG_{198}	—	November 11, 2004	Kitt Peak	Spacewatch	·	730 m	MPC · JPL
575605	2011 UM_{199}	—	September 1, 2005	Palomar	NEAT	EOS	2.0 km	MPC · JPL
575606	2011 UN_{199}	—	October 1, 2011	Mount Lemmon	Mount Lemmon Survey	·	2.5 km	MPC · JPL
575607	2011 UX_{202}	—	February 13, 2002	Apache Point	SDSS Collaboration	·	3.2 km	MPC · JPL
575608	2011 UB_{204}	—	October 18, 2011	Kitt Peak	Spacewatch	·	1.8 km	MPC · JPL
575609	2011 UF_{204}	—	October 21, 2011	Mount Lemmon	Mount Lemmon Survey	·	2.7 km	MPC · JPL
575610	2011 UP_{207}	—	August 8, 2005	Cerro Tololo	Deep Ecliptic Survey	·	2.1 km	MPC · JPL
575611	2011 UN_{211}	—	October 24, 2011	Mount Lemmon	Mount Lemmon Survey	·	2.5 km	MPC · JPL
575612	2011 UT_{211}	—	March 16, 2010	Mount Lemmon	Mount Lemmon Survey	·	660 m	MPC · JPL
575613	2011 UM_{215}	—	September 23, 2011	Kitt Peak	Spacewatch	·	2.3 km	MPC · JPL
575614	2011 UR_{215}	—	September 24, 2011	Bergisch Gladbach	W. Bickel	·	1.8 km	MPC · JPL
575615	2011 UG_{217}	—	October 24, 2011	Mount Lemmon	Mount Lemmon Survey	·	2.4 km	MPC · JPL
575616	2011 UR_{217}	—	October 22, 2011	Mount Lemmon	Mount Lemmon Survey	·	1.9 km	MPC · JPL
575617	2011 UH_{218}	—	July 16, 2005	Kitt Peak	Spacewatch	·	2.1 km	MPC · JPL
575618	2011 UA_{221}	—	October 24, 2011	Mount Lemmon	Mount Lemmon Survey	·	1.7 km	MPC · JPL
575619	2011 UC_{223}	—	October 24, 2011	Mount Lemmon	Mount Lemmon Survey	·	880 m	MPC · JPL
575620	2011 UW_{223}	—	May 28, 2004	Kitt Peak	Spacewatch	·	2.2 km	MPC · JPL
575621	2011 UO_{224}	—	October 24, 2011	Mount Lemmon	Mount Lemmon Survey	EOS	1.6 km	MPC · JPL
575622	2011 UB_{225}	—	September 12, 2007	Mount Lemmon	Mount Lemmon Survey	·	970 m	MPC · JPL
575623	2011 UC_{227}	—	September 12, 2007	Mount Lemmon	Mount Lemmon Survey	MAS	700 m	MPC · JPL
575624	2011 UG_{231}	—	September 11, 2004	Kitt Peak	Spacewatch	·	540 m	MPC · JPL
575625	2011 UO_{232}	—	October 18, 2011	Mount Lemmon	Mount Lemmon Survey	EOS	1.4 km	MPC · JPL
575626	2011 UU_{244}	—	October 26, 2011	Kitt Peak	Spacewatch	·	2.0 km	MPC · JPL
575627	2011 UM_{245}	—	May 30, 2003	Cerro Tololo	Deep Ecliptic Survey	NYS	1.0 km	MPC · JPL
575628	2011 UN_{249}	—	March 11, 2008	Mount Lemmon	Mount Lemmon Survey	·	2.9 km	MPC · JPL
575629	2011 UK_{253}	—	October 26, 2011	Haleakala	Pan-STARRS 1	·	2.6 km	MPC · JPL
575630	2011 UA_{254}	—	October 20, 2011	Mount Lemmon	Mount Lemmon Survey	V	410 m	MPC · JPL
575631	2011 UG_{259}	—	October 23, 2011	Kitt Peak	Spacewatch	·	2.2 km	MPC · JPL
575632	2011 UL_{259}	—	October 24, 2011	Haleakala	Pan-STARRS 1	·	2.5 km	MPC · JPL
575633	2011 UT_{260}	—	September 27, 2011	Mount Lemmon	Mount Lemmon Survey	·	2.2 km	MPC · JPL
575634	2011 UB_{271}	—	March 31, 2009	Mount Lemmon	Mount Lemmon Survey	·	3.5 km	MPC · JPL
575635	2011 UM_{272}	—	September 27, 2011	Mount Lemmon	Mount Lemmon Survey	·	1.8 km	MPC · JPL
575636	2011 UC_{273}	—	September 27, 2006	Catalina	CSS	NAE	2.7 km	MPC · JPL
575637	2011 UF_{273}	—	August 26, 2011	Piszkéstető	K. Sárneczky	·	3.0 km	MPC · JPL
575638	2011 UG_{276}	—	September 3, 2010	Mount Lemmon	Mount Lemmon Survey	·	3.2 km	MPC · JPL
575639	2011 UO_{277}	—	January 19, 2005	Kitt Peak	Spacewatch	·	990 m	MPC · JPL
575640	2011 US_{277}	—	November 11, 2004	Kitt Peak	Spacewatch	·	490 m	MPC · JPL
575641	2011 UZ_{282}	—	March 29, 2008	Catalina	CSS	·	3.2 km	MPC · JPL
575642	2011 UX_{283}	—	May 14, 2010	Mount Lemmon	Mount Lemmon Survey	·	1.2 km	MPC · JPL
575643	2011 UK_{285}	—	October 20, 2011	Mount Lemmon	Mount Lemmon Survey	·	2.9 km	MPC · JPL
575644	2011 UK_{286}	—	December 31, 2007	Kitt Peak	Spacewatch	EOS	1.7 km	MPC · JPL
575645	2011 UN_{289}	—	September 24, 2011	Haleakala	Pan-STARRS 1	·	1.3 km	MPC · JPL
575646	2011 UB_{290}	—	January 2, 2009	Mount Lemmon	Mount Lemmon Survey	·	590 m	MPC · JPL
575647	2011 UE_{292}	—	October 23, 2011	Mount Lemmon	Mount Lemmon Survey	·	1.6 km	MPC · JPL
575648	2011 UM_{293}	—	July 12, 2005	Mount Lemmon	Mount Lemmon Survey	·	1.9 km	MPC · JPL
575649	2011 UD_{295}	—	October 14, 2007	Mount Lemmon	Mount Lemmon Survey	·	1.1 km	MPC · JPL
575650	2011 UH_{296}	—	October 23, 2004	Kitt Peak	Spacewatch	·	730 m	MPC · JPL
575651	2011 UY_{298}	—	August 30, 2005	Campo Imperatore	CINEOS	TIR	2.4 km	MPC · JPL
575652	2011 UL_{301}	—	October 2, 2006	Mount Lemmon	Mount Lemmon Survey	·	2.0 km	MPC · JPL
575653	2011 UL_{302}	—	October 4, 2011	Piszkéstető	K. Sárneczky	·	2.6 km	MPC · JPL
575654	2011 UW_{303}	—	October 31, 2011	Mayhill-ISON	L. Elenin	·	1.5 km	MPC · JPL
575655	2011 US_{304}	—	October 23, 2011	Mount Lemmon	Mount Lemmon Survey	·	970 m	MPC · JPL
575656	2011 UN_{305}	—	October 1, 2011	Sternwarte Hagen	Klein, M.	·	2.5 km	MPC · JPL
575657	2011 UC_{306}	—	October 23, 2011	Mount Lemmon	Mount Lemmon Survey	NYS	920 m	MPC · JPL
575658	2011 UM_{310}	—	December 20, 2004	Mount Lemmon	Mount Lemmon Survey	MAS	600 m	MPC · JPL
575659	2011 UN_{313}	—	October 22, 2011	Kitt Peak	Spacewatch	·	2.1 km	MPC · JPL
575660	2011 UP_{313}	—	October 18, 2011	Kitt Peak	Spacewatch	·	820 m	MPC · JPL
575661	2011 UN_{314}	—	October 30, 2011	Kitt Peak	Spacewatch	·	2.5 km	MPC · JPL
575662	2011 UU_{315}	—	July 30, 2005	Palomar	NEAT	·	3.8 km	MPC · JPL
575663	2011 UM_{316}	—	October 30, 2011	Kitt Peak	Spacewatch	EOS	1.7 km	MPC · JPL
575664	2011 US_{317}	—	October 24, 2011	Haleakala	Pan-STARRS 1	·	640 m	MPC · JPL
575665	2011 UT_{317}	—	October 22, 2011	Kitt Peak	Spacewatch	·	2.3 km	MPC · JPL
575666	2011 UY_{323}	—	October 18, 2011	Haleakala	Pan-STARRS 1	URS	3.2 km	MPC · JPL
575667	2011 UJ_{325}	—	January 20, 2009	Kitt Peak	Spacewatch	·	670 m	MPC · JPL
575668	2011 UN_{327}	—	October 22, 2011	Mount Lemmon	Mount Lemmon Survey	·	1.5 km	MPC · JPL
575669	2011 UD_{330}	—	November 16, 2006	Kitt Peak	Spacewatch	EOS	1.5 km	MPC · JPL
575670	2011 US_{331}	—	October 24, 2011	Haleakala	Pan-STARRS 1	·	1.7 km	MPC · JPL
575671	2011 UG_{334}	—	October 31, 2011	Mount Lemmon	Mount Lemmon Survey	VER	2.2 km	MPC · JPL
575672	2011 UT_{337}	—	September 14, 1998	Kitt Peak	Spacewatch	·	1.1 km	MPC · JPL
575673	2011 UU_{338}	—	September 26, 2011	Kitt Peak	Spacewatch	·	1.9 km	MPC · JPL
575674	2011 UG_{339}	—	November 19, 2006	Kitt Peak	Spacewatch	·	1.7 km	MPC · JPL
575675	2011 UH_{339}	—	September 21, 2011	Kitt Peak	Spacewatch	·	1.5 km	MPC · JPL
575676	2011 US_{345}	—	October 22, 2006	Palomar	NEAT	·	2.4 km	MPC · JPL
575677	2011 UX_{347}	—	September 28, 2006	Mount Lemmon	Mount Lemmon Survey	·	1.7 km	MPC · JPL
575678	2011 UN_{350}	—	September 26, 2011	Kitt Peak	Spacewatch	·	1.7 km	MPC · JPL
575679	2011 UE_{351}	—	October 19, 2011	Mount Lemmon	Mount Lemmon Survey	EOS	1.5 km	MPC · JPL
575680	2011 UF_{351}	—	October 19, 2011	Kitt Peak	Spacewatch	·	2.8 km	MPC · JPL
575681	2011 UX_{354}	—	September 25, 2011	Eskridge	Dose, E.	·	3.3 km	MPC · JPL
575682	2011 UX_{357}	—	October 20, 2011	Mount Lemmon	Mount Lemmon Survey	EOS	2.0 km	MPC · JPL
575683	2011 UD_{358}	—	September 25, 2011	Haleakala	Pan-STARRS 1	LIX	3.2 km	MPC · JPL
575684	2011 UB_{359}	—	October 20, 2011	Mount Lemmon	Mount Lemmon Survey	·	600 m	MPC · JPL
575685	2011 UV_{359}	—	September 28, 2011	Mount Lemmon	Mount Lemmon Survey	·	2.4 km	MPC · JPL
575686	2011 UL_{360}	—	December 31, 2008	Kitt Peak	Spacewatch	·	1.0 km	MPC · JPL
575687	2011 UB_{364}	—	October 22, 2011	Mount Lemmon	Mount Lemmon Survey	LIX	3.1 km	MPC · JPL
575688	2011 UP_{367}	—	October 22, 2011	Mount Lemmon	Mount Lemmon Survey	·	3.1 km	MPC · JPL
575689	2011 UV_{371}	—	March 26, 2003	Kitt Peak	Spacewatch	·	2.6 km	MPC · JPL
575690	2011 UQ_{374}	—	February 16, 2002	Palomar	NEAT	·	2.9 km	MPC · JPL
575691	2011 UA_{378}	—	March 28, 2009	Kitt Peak	Spacewatch	·	3.2 km	MPC · JPL
575692	2011 UG_{379}	—	December 17, 2007	Mount Lemmon	Mount Lemmon Survey	·	1.2 km	MPC · JPL
575693	2011 UA_{381}	—	March 15, 2010	Mount Lemmon	Mount Lemmon Survey	(2076)	760 m	MPC · JPL
575694	2011 UC_{381}	—	February 22, 2009	Kitt Peak	Spacewatch	·	920 m	MPC · JPL
575695	2011 UG_{381}	—	August 25, 2005	Palomar	NEAT	HYG	2.4 km	MPC · JPL
575696	2011 UB_{382}	—	April 8, 2008	Mount Lemmon	Mount Lemmon Survey	·	2.3 km	MPC · JPL
575697	2011 UT_{382}	—	August 30, 2005	Kitt Peak	Spacewatch	·	3.1 km	MPC · JPL
575698	2011 UA_{383}	—	February 13, 2002	Apache Point	SDSS Collaboration	·	920 m	MPC · JPL
575699	2011 UW_{386}	—	November 24, 2006	Kitt Peak	Spacewatch	·	2.7 km	MPC · JPL
575700	2011 UY_{386}	—	October 25, 2011	Haleakala	Pan-STARRS 1	·	1.2 km	MPC · JPL

== 575701–575800 ==
back to top

Designation			Discovery			Properties		Ref
Permanent	Provisional	Named after	Date	Site	Discoverer(s)	Category	Diam.	Ref
575701	2011 UJ_{387}	—	October 25, 2011	Haleakala	Pan-STARRS 1	·	2.0 km	MPC · JPL
575702	2011 UN_{387}	—	October 25, 2011	Haleakala	Pan-STARRS 1	·	2.3 km	MPC · JPL
575703	2011 UO_{388}	—	October 25, 2011	Haleakala	Pan-STARRS 1	·	2.2 km	MPC · JPL
575704	2011 UF_{389}	—	July 8, 2005	Kitt Peak	Spacewatch	·	3.1 km	MPC · JPL
575705	2011 UF_{395}	—	August 26, 2005	Palomar	NEAT	·	2.8 km	MPC · JPL
575706	2011 UQ_{396}	—	August 27, 2005	Palomar	NEAT	·	4.4 km	MPC · JPL
575707	2011 UU_{397}	—	February 13, 2008	Mount Lemmon	Mount Lemmon Survey	·	2.2 km	MPC · JPL
575708	2011 UA_{399}	—	September 24, 2011	Haleakala	Pan-STARRS 1	·	2.2 km	MPC · JPL
575709	2011 UJ_{399}	—	October 31, 2011	Mount Lemmon	Mount Lemmon Survey	·	1.6 km	MPC · JPL
575710	2011 UP_{400}	—	October 29, 2000	Kitt Peak	Spacewatch	EOS	1.7 km	MPC · JPL
575711	2011 UH_{401}	—	October 12, 2007	Kitt Peak	Spacewatch	·	790 m	MPC · JPL
575712	2011 UK_{401}	—	October 19, 2011	Kitt Peak	Spacewatch	·	1.0 km	MPC · JPL
575713	2011 UT_{410}	—	October 24, 2011	Mauna Kea	M. Alexandersen, B. J. Gladman, J. J. Kavelaars	plutino	351 km	MPC · JPL
575714	2011 UJ_{415}	—	October 24, 2011	Mount Lemmon	Mount Lemmon Survey	·	900 m	MPC · JPL
575715	2011 UH_{419}	—	October 24, 2011	Haleakala	Pan-STARRS 1	·	2.9 km	MPC · JPL
575716	2011 UM_{419}	—	February 24, 2014	Haleakala	Pan-STARRS 1	VER	2.5 km	MPC · JPL
575717	2011 UX_{419}	—	October 26, 2011	Haleakala	Pan-STARRS 1	·	2.5 km	MPC · JPL
575718	2011 UB_{420}	—	April 8, 2014	Haleakala	Pan-STARRS 1	·	2.7 km	MPC · JPL
575719	2011 UF_{420}	—	October 20, 2011	Mount Lemmon	Mount Lemmon Survey	·	2.5 km	MPC · JPL
575720	2011 UX_{420}	—	June 26, 2014	Haleakala	Pan-STARRS 1	·	690 m	MPC · JPL
575721	2011 UH_{422}	—	February 13, 2013	Haleakala	Pan-STARRS 1	·	2.2 km	MPC · JPL
575722	2011 UW_{422}	—	October 16, 2015	Mount Lemmon	Mount Lemmon Survey	·	1.1 km	MPC · JPL
575723	2011 UK_{423}	—	October 20, 2011	Mount Lemmon	Mount Lemmon Survey	·	560 m	MPC · JPL
575724	2011 UF_{424}	—	October 19, 2011	Haleakala	Pan-STARRS 1	·	2.3 km	MPC · JPL
575725	2011 UM_{424}	—	October 23, 2011	Haleakala	Pan-STARRS 1	H	400 m	MPC · JPL
575726	2011 UT_{424}	—	October 27, 2011	Mount Lemmon	Mount Lemmon Survey	·	910 m	MPC · JPL
575727	2011 UF_{425}	—	May 15, 2015	Haleakala	Pan-STARRS 1	·	1.9 km	MPC · JPL
575728	2011 UY_{425}	—	October 23, 2011	Haleakala	Pan-STARRS 1	·	2.4 km	MPC · JPL
575729	2011 UQ_{427}	—	October 24, 2011	Haleakala	Pan-STARRS 1	EOS	1.6 km	MPC · JPL
575730	2011 UG_{429}	—	January 12, 2008	Mount Lemmon	Mount Lemmon Survey	·	870 m	MPC · JPL
575731	2011 UM_{433}	—	June 4, 2014	Haleakala	Pan-STARRS 1	·	2.5 km	MPC · JPL
575732	2011 UG_{434}	—	October 31, 2011	Kitt Peak	Spacewatch	·	2.7 km	MPC · JPL
575733	2011 UE_{435}	—	October 26, 2011	Haleakala	Pan-STARRS 1	NYS	620 m	MPC · JPL
575734	2011 UE_{436}	—	October 24, 2011	Haleakala	Pan-STARRS 1	·	2.7 km	MPC · JPL
575735	2011 UR_{436}	—	August 20, 2014	Haleakala	Pan-STARRS 1	·	910 m	MPC · JPL
575736	2011 UE_{439}	—	August 13, 2016	Haleakala	Pan-STARRS 1	EOS	1.5 km	MPC · JPL
575737	2011 UX_{440}	—	May 28, 2014	Mount Lemmon	Mount Lemmon Survey	·	3.1 km	MPC · JPL
575738	2011 UB_{442}	—	July 7, 2016	Mount Lemmon	Mount Lemmon Survey	·	2.7 km	MPC · JPL
575739	2011 UE_{442}	—	October 19, 2011	Haleakala	Pan-STARRS 1	EOS	1.7 km	MPC · JPL
575740	2011 UQ_{442}	—	August 2, 2016	Haleakala	Pan-STARRS 1	·	2.4 km	MPC · JPL
575741	2011 UW_{443}	—	October 25, 2011	Haleakala	Pan-STARRS 1	·	3.8 km	MPC · JPL
575742	2011 UA_{444}	—	October 24, 2011	Mount Lemmon	Mount Lemmon Survey	·	2.3 km	MPC · JPL
575743	2011 UD_{444}	—	October 21, 2011	Kitt Peak	Spacewatch	·	1.8 km	MPC · JPL
575744	2011 UE_{447}	—	October 18, 2011	Kitt Peak	Spacewatch	·	2.2 km	MPC · JPL
575745	2011 UG_{447}	—	October 22, 2011	Mount Lemmon	Mount Lemmon Survey	·	2.2 km	MPC · JPL
575746	2011 UM_{448}	—	October 26, 2011	Haleakala	Pan-STARRS 1	EOS	1.8 km	MPC · JPL
575747	2011 UX_{448}	—	October 26, 2011	Haleakala	Pan-STARRS 1	·	2.6 km	MPC · JPL
575748	2011 UL_{449}	—	October 18, 2011	Mount Lemmon	Mount Lemmon Survey	EOS	1.5 km	MPC · JPL
575749	2011 UT_{449}	—	October 23, 2011	Mount Lemmon	Mount Lemmon Survey	·	2.4 km	MPC · JPL
575750	2011 UA_{450}	—	October 19, 2011	Mount Lemmon	Mount Lemmon Survey	·	580 m	MPC · JPL
575751	2011 UT_{451}	—	October 27, 2011	Mount Lemmon	Mount Lemmon Survey	·	3.2 km	MPC · JPL
575752	2011 UJ_{452}	—	October 23, 2011	Mount Lemmon	Mount Lemmon Survey	URS	2.9 km	MPC · JPL
575753	2011 UL_{452}	—	October 30, 2011	Mount Lemmon	Mount Lemmon Survey	·	1.5 km	MPC · JPL
575754	2011 UW_{452}	—	October 26, 2011	Haleakala	Pan-STARRS 1	·	2.5 km	MPC · JPL
575755	2011 UX_{452}	—	October 22, 2011	Mount Lemmon	Mount Lemmon Survey	·	2.7 km	MPC · JPL
575756	2011 UD_{453}	—	October 24, 2011	Haleakala	Pan-STARRS 1	·	2.2 km	MPC · JPL
575757	2011 UM_{453}	—	October 23, 2011	Haleakala	Pan-STARRS 1	·	2.4 km	MPC · JPL
575758	2011 UX_{453}	—	October 26, 2011	Haleakala	Pan-STARRS 1	·	940 m	MPC · JPL
575759	2011 UJ_{454}	—	October 23, 2011	Haleakala	Pan-STARRS 1	·	2.5 km	MPC · JPL
575760	2011 UL_{454}	—	October 23, 2011	Haleakala	Pan-STARRS 1	·	3.0 km	MPC · JPL
575761	2011 UV_{454}	—	October 25, 2011	Haleakala	Pan-STARRS 1	·	1.5 km	MPC · JPL
575762	2011 UK_{455}	—	October 24, 2011	Haleakala	Pan-STARRS 1	EOS	1.5 km	MPC · JPL
575763	2011 UP_{455}	—	October 24, 2011	Haleakala	Pan-STARRS 1	EOS	1.4 km	MPC · JPL
575764	2011 UR_{455}	—	September 19, 2007	Kitt Peak	Spacewatch	·	890 m	MPC · JPL
575765	2011 UG_{458}	—	October 24, 2011	Haleakala	Pan-STARRS 1	·	2.4 km	MPC · JPL
575766	2011 US_{458}	—	October 23, 2011	Haleakala	Pan-STARRS 1	·	1.6 km	MPC · JPL
575767	2011 UR_{459}	—	October 20, 2011	Mount Lemmon	Mount Lemmon Survey	HOF	1.7 km	MPC · JPL
575768	2011 UU_{459}	—	October 26, 2011	Haleakala	Pan-STARRS 1	KOR	1.0 km	MPC · JPL
575769	2011 UL_{460}	—	September 10, 2007	Mount Lemmon	Mount Lemmon Survey	MAS	410 m	MPC · JPL
575770	2011 UD_{463}	—	October 23, 2011	Mount Lemmon	Mount Lemmon Survey	VER	2.1 km	MPC · JPL
575771	2011 UE_{463}	—	October 20, 2011	Mount Lemmon	Mount Lemmon Survey	·	2.7 km	MPC · JPL
575772	2011 UR_{463}	—	October 24, 2011	Haleakala	Pan-STARRS 1	·	2.7 km	MPC · JPL
575773	2011 UD_{471}	—	October 19, 2011	Kitt Peak	Spacewatch	·	1.1 km	MPC · JPL
575774	2011 UE_{471}	—	October 23, 2011	Mount Lemmon	Mount Lemmon Survey	·	760 m	MPC · JPL
575775	2011 VG	—	November 3, 2004	Kitt Peak	Spacewatch	·	480 m	MPC · JPL
575776	2011 VT	—	December 17, 2007	Mount Lemmon	Mount Lemmon Survey	·	1.9 km	MPC · JPL
575777	2011 VC_{5}	—	October 21, 2011	Piszkéstető	K. Sárneczky	·	3.9 km	MPC · JPL
575778	2011 VF_{6}	—	September 30, 2011	Kitt Peak	Spacewatch	·	2.6 km	MPC · JPL
575779	2011 VP_{6}	—	November 3, 2011	Mount Lemmon	Mount Lemmon Survey	·	910 m	MPC · JPL
575780	2011 VD_{14}	—	October 19, 2011	Kitt Peak	Spacewatch	·	1.8 km	MPC · JPL
575781	2011 VB_{17}	—	August 30, 2005	Kitt Peak	Spacewatch	·	2.2 km	MPC · JPL
575782	2011 VS_{18}	—	November 27, 2006	Mount Lemmon	Mount Lemmon Survey	·	1.7 km	MPC · JPL
575783	2011 VD_{20}	—	October 24, 2011	Haleakala	Pan-STARRS 1	·	1.1 km	MPC · JPL
575784	2011 VU_{21}	—	October 22, 2011	Kitt Peak	Spacewatch	·	2.1 km	MPC · JPL
575785	2011 VR_{23}	—	November 3, 2011	Mount Lemmon	Mount Lemmon Survey	EOS	1.8 km	MPC · JPL
575786	2011 VM_{25}	—	July 4, 2005	Kitt Peak	Spacewatch	·	2.6 km	MPC · JPL
575787	2011 VN_{25}	—	November 3, 2011	Mount Lemmon	Mount Lemmon Survey	·	2.7 km	MPC · JPL
575788	2011 VR_{25}	—	November 1, 2011	Catalina	CSS	H	530 m	MPC · JPL
575789	2011 VV_{25}	—	December 23, 2012	Haleakala	Pan-STARRS 1	·	2.0 km	MPC · JPL
575790	2011 VW_{25}	—	January 17, 2013	Kitt Peak	Spacewatch	·	2.1 km	MPC · JPL
575791	2011 VK_{26}	—	November 2, 2011	Mount Lemmon	Mount Lemmon Survey	·	2.4 km	MPC · JPL
575792	2011 VM_{26}	—	January 17, 2013	Haleakala	Pan-STARRS 1	·	1.6 km	MPC · JPL
575793	2011 VO_{26}	—	January 17, 2013	Haleakala	Pan-STARRS 1	VER	2.1 km	MPC · JPL
575794	2011 VD_{30}	—	November 3, 2011	Mount Lemmon	Mount Lemmon Survey	VER	2.4 km	MPC · JPL
575795	2011 VH_{30}	—	November 3, 2011	Mount Lemmon	Mount Lemmon Survey	·	2.8 km	MPC · JPL
575796	2011 VZ_{30}	—	November 2, 2011	Mount Lemmon	Mount Lemmon Survey	·	1.7 km	MPC · JPL
575797	2011 VA_{33}	—	November 2, 2011	Mount Lemmon	Mount Lemmon Survey	·	3.0 km	MPC · JPL
575798	2011 WF_{3}	—	November 16, 2011	Mount Lemmon	Mount Lemmon Survey	·	2.4 km	MPC · JPL
575799	2011 WO_{3}	—	October 24, 2011	Haleakala	Pan-STARRS 1	·	2.3 km	MPC · JPL
575800	2011 WS_{3}	—	November 3, 2011	Mount Lemmon	Mount Lemmon Survey	H	440 m	MPC · JPL

== 575801–575900 ==
back to top

Designation			Discovery			Properties		Ref
Permanent	Provisional	Named after	Date	Site	Discoverer(s)	Category	Diam.	Ref
575801	2011 WC_{5}	—	October 6, 2004	Palomar	NEAT	·	660 m	MPC · JPL
575802	2011 WQ_{6}	—	November 3, 2007	Kitt Peak	Spacewatch	·	580 m	MPC · JPL
575803	2011 WU_{14}	—	August 6, 2005	Palomar	NEAT	·	2.7 km	MPC · JPL
575804	2011 WG_{17}	—	September 21, 2000	Haleakala	NEAT	·	1.1 km	MPC · JPL
575805	2011 WS_{17}	—	October 24, 2011	Kitt Peak	Spacewatch	·	2.3 km	MPC · JPL
575806	2011 WV_{18}	—	October 18, 2011	Mount Lemmon	Mount Lemmon Survey	EOS	1.6 km	MPC · JPL
575807	2011 WP_{20}	—	November 1, 2011	Kitt Peak	Spacewatch	·	2.0 km	MPC · JPL
575808	2011 WB_{21}	—	November 17, 2011	Mount Lemmon	Mount Lemmon Survey	EOS	1.8 km	MPC · JPL
575809	2011 WC_{29}	—	October 23, 2011	Haleakala	Pan-STARRS 1	H	550 m	MPC · JPL
575810	2011 WL_{29}	—	September 8, 2000	Kitt Peak	Spacewatch	·	940 m	MPC · JPL
575811	2011 WX_{29}	—	October 25, 2011	Kitt Peak	Spacewatch	·	2.8 km	MPC · JPL
575812	2011 WN_{30}	—	October 24, 2011	Haleakala	Pan-STARRS 1	·	1.9 km	MPC · JPL
575813	2011 WO_{31}	—	November 22, 2011	Piszkés-tető	K. Sárneczky, A. Pál	·	2.5 km	MPC · JPL
575814	2011 WZ_{31}	—	November 23, 2011	Piszkés-tető	K. Sárneczky, A. Pál	·	2.4 km	MPC · JPL
575815	2011 WJ_{32}	—	August 10, 2007	Eskridge	G. Hug	·	800 m	MPC · JPL
575816	2011 WG_{33}	—	October 28, 2011	Mount Lemmon	Mount Lemmon Survey	·	2.9 km	MPC · JPL
575817	2011 WV_{35}	—	October 23, 2005	Catalina	CSS	·	3.7 km	MPC · JPL
575818	2011 WP_{37}	—	August 28, 2005	Anderson Mesa	LONEOS	·	2.6 km	MPC · JPL
575819	2011 WG_{39}	—	November 24, 2011	Haleakala	Pan-STARRS 1	H	370 m	MPC · JPL
575820	2011 WL_{39}	—	October 4, 2007	Mount Lemmon	Mount Lemmon Survey	·	1.0 km	MPC · JPL
575821	2011 WB_{43}	—	December 15, 2001	Apache Point	SDSS Collaboration	·	600 m	MPC · JPL
575822	2011 WH_{43}	—	November 16, 2011	Mount Lemmon	Mount Lemmon Survey	·	700 m	MPC · JPL
575823	2011 WX_{45}	—	November 25, 2011	Haleakala	Pan-STARRS 1	H	390 m	MPC · JPL
575824	2011 WF_{46}	—	May 16, 2005	Kitt Peak	Spacewatch	H	420 m	MPC · JPL
575825	2011 WA_{48}	—	April 15, 2010	Mount Lemmon	Mount Lemmon Survey	·	570 m	MPC · JPL
575826	2011 WM_{49}	—	November 3, 2011	Mount Lemmon	Mount Lemmon Survey	H	390 m	MPC · JPL
575827	2011 WP_{50}	—	November 23, 2011	Catalina	CSS	·	880 m	MPC · JPL
575828	2011 WH_{54}	—	November 12, 2006	Mount Lemmon	Mount Lemmon Survey	EOS	1.6 km	MPC · JPL
575829	2011 WX_{55}	—	August 8, 2004	Palomar	NEAT	·	690 m	MPC · JPL
575830	2011 WF_{56}	—	August 27, 2005	Palomar	NEAT	·	2.0 km	MPC · JPL
575831	2011 WN_{57}	—	October 23, 2011	Kitt Peak	Spacewatch	·	2.5 km	MPC · JPL
575832	2011 WF_{58}	—	October 26, 2011	Haleakala	Pan-STARRS 1	·	1.7 km	MPC · JPL
575833	2011 WO_{58}	—	October 26, 2011	Haleakala	Pan-STARRS 1	·	1.7 km	MPC · JPL
575834	2011 WP_{58}	—	October 26, 2011	Haleakala	Pan-STARRS 1	·	2.4 km	MPC · JPL
575835	2011 WV_{58}	—	October 26, 2011	Haleakala	Pan-STARRS 1	·	2.1 km	MPC · JPL
575836	2011 WL_{59}	—	February 6, 2002	Kitt Peak	Deep Ecliptic Survey	·	810 m	MPC · JPL
575837	2011 WD_{60}	—	October 26, 2011	Haleakala	Pan-STARRS 1	·	550 m	MPC · JPL
575838	2011 WG_{60}	—	October 26, 2011	Haleakala	Pan-STARRS 1	·	2.2 km	MPC · JPL
575839	2011 WB_{62}	—	October 26, 2011	Haleakala	Pan-STARRS 1	·	2.7 km	MPC · JPL
575840	2011 WZ_{69}	—	October 20, 2011	Mount Lemmon	Mount Lemmon Survey	·	1.9 km	MPC · JPL
575841	2011 WX_{73}	—	September 1, 2005	Palomar	NEAT	·	2.2 km	MPC · JPL
575842	2011 WP_{75}	—	October 23, 2011	Kitt Peak	Spacewatch	·	2.7 km	MPC · JPL
575843	2011 WU_{76}	—	October 25, 2011	Haleakala	Pan-STARRS 1	·	2.3 km	MPC · JPL
575844	2011 WR_{85}	—	January 17, 2007	Kitt Peak	Spacewatch	·	2.8 km	MPC · JPL
575845	2011 WW_{85}	—	September 12, 2007	Mount Lemmon	Mount Lemmon Survey	·	860 m	MPC · JPL
575846	2011 WW_{86}	—	October 29, 2011	Kitt Peak	Spacewatch	·	2.1 km	MPC · JPL
575847	2011 WY_{87}	—	September 30, 2005	Mount Lemmon	Mount Lemmon Survey	THM	1.6 km	MPC · JPL
575848	2011 WS_{89}	—	November 25, 2011	Haleakala	Pan-STARRS 1	·	3.0 km	MPC · JPL
575849	2011 WR_{90}	—	November 17, 2011	Kitt Peak	Spacewatch	·	3.0 km	MPC · JPL
575850	2011 WE_{91}	—	January 14, 2002	Kitt Peak	Spacewatch	·	640 m	MPC · JPL
575851	2011 WH_{92}	—	October 19, 2011	Kitt Peak	Spacewatch	EOS	1.8 km	MPC · JPL
575852	2011 WJ_{93}	—	October 26, 2011	Haleakala	Pan-STARRS 1	·	1.8 km	MPC · JPL
575853	2011 WC_{94}	—	November 27, 2011	Mount Lemmon	Mount Lemmon Survey	·	2.6 km	MPC · JPL
575854	2011 WC_{97}	—	October 30, 2011	Mount Lemmon	Mount Lemmon Survey	V	470 m	MPC · JPL
575855	2011 WP_{97}	—	October 25, 2011	Haleakala	Pan-STARRS 1	·	2.5 km	MPC · JPL
575856	2011 WO_{99}	—	October 23, 2011	Haleakala	Pan-STARRS 1	·	1.3 km	MPC · JPL
575857	2011 WP_{101}	—	November 27, 2011	Kitt Peak	Spacewatch	·	2.2 km	MPC · JPL
575858	2011 WO_{102}	—	October 26, 2011	Haleakala	Pan-STARRS 1	·	2.2 km	MPC · JPL
575859	2011 WA_{103}	—	October 23, 2011	Haleakala	Pan-STARRS 1	·	770 m	MPC · JPL
575860	2011 WO_{103}	—	February 13, 2002	Apache Point	SDSS Collaboration	·	2.4 km	MPC · JPL
575861	2011 WP_{103}	—	October 24, 2011	Haleakala	Pan-STARRS 1	·	1.9 km	MPC · JPL
575862	2011 WJ_{104}	—	October 28, 2006	Mount Lemmon	Mount Lemmon Survey	TIR	3.8 km	MPC · JPL
575863	2011 WJ_{107}	—	November 30, 2011	Kitt Peak	Spacewatch	·	2.5 km	MPC · JPL
575864	2011 WM_{108}	—	September 24, 2011	Mount Lemmon	Mount Lemmon Survey	·	2.5 km	MPC · JPL
575865	2011 WC_{110}	—	July 27, 2005	Palomar	NEAT	·	2.0 km	MPC · JPL
575866	2011 WA_{117}	—	November 17, 2011	Mount Lemmon	Mount Lemmon Survey	·	730 m	MPC · JPL
575867	2011 WE_{117}	—	July 23, 2003	Palomar	NEAT	·	1.7 km	MPC · JPL
575868	2011 WT_{118}	—	November 18, 2011	Mount Lemmon	Mount Lemmon Survey	·	3.0 km	MPC · JPL
575869	2011 WP_{124}	—	October 13, 1999	Apache Point	SDSS Collaboration	·	2.7 km	MPC · JPL
575870	2011 WH_{125}	—	November 18, 2011	Mount Lemmon	Mount Lemmon Survey	·	2.4 km	MPC · JPL
575871	2011 WY_{125}	—	October 29, 2011	Kitt Peak	Spacewatch	·	2.5 km	MPC · JPL
575872	2011 WQ_{126}	—	October 10, 1999	Kitt Peak	Spacewatch	·	3.0 km	MPC · JPL
575873	2011 WS_{130}	—	October 26, 2011	Haleakala	Pan-STARRS 1	·	2.0 km	MPC · JPL
575874	2011 WA_{131}	—	October 26, 2011	Haleakala	Pan-STARRS 1	EOS	1.7 km	MPC · JPL
575875	2011 WG_{131}	—	July 7, 2000	Kitt Peak	Spacewatch	V	530 m	MPC · JPL
575876	2011 WT_{135}	—	September 1, 2005	Palomar	NEAT	LIX	2.8 km	MPC · JPL
575877	2011 WV_{139}	—	August 29, 2005	Kitt Peak	Spacewatch	LIX	2.9 km	MPC · JPL
575878	2011 WN_{140}	—	October 27, 2011	Mount Lemmon	Mount Lemmon Survey	EOS	1.8 km	MPC · JPL
575879	2011 WX_{140}	—	October 23, 2011	Haleakala	Pan-STARRS 1	·	2.5 km	MPC · JPL
575880	2011 WE_{141}	—	November 19, 2011	Mount Lemmon	Mount Lemmon Survey	·	2.6 km	MPC · JPL
575881	2011 WX_{143}	—	July 12, 2005	Mount Lemmon	Mount Lemmon Survey	·	1.9 km	MPC · JPL
575882	2011 WE_{144}	—	May 21, 2010	Mount Lemmon	Mount Lemmon Survey	·	1.2 km	MPC · JPL
575883	2011 WS_{144}	—	October 25, 2011	Haleakala	Pan-STARRS 1	·	880 m	MPC · JPL
575884	2011 WS_{148}	—	November 18, 2011	Mount Lemmon	Mount Lemmon Survey	TIR	2.3 km	MPC · JPL
575885	2011 WU_{148}	—	November 25, 2011	Haleakala	Pan-STARRS 1	L4 · 006	9.3 km	MPC · JPL
575886	2011 WP_{159}	—	February 7, 2013	Catalina	CSS	·	3.4 km	MPC · JPL
575887	2011 WW_{159}	—	June 4, 2014	Haleakala	Pan-STARRS 1	·	630 m	MPC · JPL
575888	2011 WY_{159}	—	May 6, 2014	Mount Lemmon	Mount Lemmon Survey	·	3.0 km	MPC · JPL
575889	2011 WC_{161}	—	November 27, 2011	Mount Lemmon	Mount Lemmon Survey	·	2.7 km	MPC · JPL
575890	2011 WY_{163}	—	November 30, 2011	Catalina	CSS	TIR	2.5 km	MPC · JPL
575891	2011 WN_{164}	—	March 3, 2013	Nogales	M. Schwartz, P. R. Holvorcem	·	840 m	MPC · JPL
575892	2011 WR_{164}	—	December 30, 2000	Socorro	LINEAR	·	2.6 km	MPC · JPL
575893	2011 WO_{166}	—	June 26, 2014	Haleakala	Pan-STARRS 1	·	670 m	MPC · JPL
575894	2011 WV_{171}	—	January 17, 2013	Kitt Peak	Spacewatch	·	2.7 km	MPC · JPL
575895	2011 WO_{174}	—	November 27, 2011	Mount Lemmon	Mount Lemmon Survey	·	2.4 km	MPC · JPL
575896	2011 WR_{174}	—	November 18, 2011	Mount Lemmon	Mount Lemmon Survey	EOS	1.8 km	MPC · JPL
575897	2011 WD_{175}	—	November 25, 2011	Haleakala	Pan-STARRS 1	·	2.6 km	MPC · JPL
575898	2011 WK_{175}	—	November 24, 2011	Haleakala	Pan-STARRS 1	VER	2.4 km	MPC · JPL
575899	2011 WM_{176}	—	November 24, 2011	Mount Lemmon	Mount Lemmon Survey	·	3.2 km	MPC · JPL
575900	2011 WS_{176}	—	November 24, 2011	Haleakala	Pan-STARRS 1	·	3.3 km	MPC · JPL

== 575901–576000 ==
back to top

Designation			Discovery			Properties		Ref
Permanent	Provisional	Named after	Date	Site	Discoverer(s)	Category	Diam.	Ref
575901	2011 WM_{177}	—	November 28, 2011	Mount Lemmon	Mount Lemmon Survey	V	540 m	MPC · JPL
575902	2011 XR_{6}	—	December 6, 2011	Haleakala	Pan-STARRS 1	·	2.7 km	MPC · JPL
575903	2011 YJ	—	September 18, 2009	Kitt Peak	Spacewatch	L4	9.8 km	MPC · JPL
575904	2011 YT_{3}	—	May 1, 2009	Mount Lemmon	Mount Lemmon Survey	·	3.2 km	MPC · JPL
575905	2011 YU_{5}	—	December 24, 2011	Catalina	CSS	H	550 m	MPC · JPL
575906	2011 YG_{7}	—	November 18, 2011	Mount Lemmon	Mount Lemmon Survey	·	3.6 km	MPC · JPL
575907	2011 YS_{7}	—	December 3, 2005	Kitt Peak	Spacewatch	·	2.6 km	MPC · JPL
575908	2011 YH_{13}	—	February 3, 2001	Kitt Peak	Spacewatch	·	1.3 km	MPC · JPL
575909	2011 YC_{15}	—	December 26, 2011	Mount Lemmon	Mount Lemmon Survey	V	570 m	MPC · JPL
575910	2011 YQ_{18}	—	December 28, 2011	Mount Lemmon	Mount Lemmon Survey	·	2.7 km	MPC · JPL
575911	2011 YX_{21}	—	February 19, 2001	Haleakala	NEAT	·	3.4 km	MPC · JPL
575912	2011 YD_{22}	—	December 25, 2011	Kitt Peak	Spacewatch	·	2.9 km	MPC · JPL
575913	2011 YN_{22}	—	November 24, 2011	Haleakala	Pan-STARRS 1	L4 · 006	10 km	MPC · JPL
575914	2011 YO_{28}	—	November 16, 2011	Kitt Peak	Spacewatch	·	1.2 km	MPC · JPL
575915	2011 YT_{28}	—	December 13, 2003	Palomar	NEAT	H	550 m	MPC · JPL
575916	2011 YM_{30}	—	December 23, 2000	Apache Point	SDSS Collaboration	·	3.1 km	MPC · JPL
575917	2011 YA_{31}	—	November 1, 2005	Catalina	CSS	·	2.9 km	MPC · JPL
575918	2011 YH_{31}	—	November 2, 2007	Mount Lemmon	Mount Lemmon Survey	·	1.1 km	MPC · JPL
575919	2011 YA_{32}	—	December 26, 2011	Kitt Peak	Spacewatch	·	1.1 km	MPC · JPL
575920	2011 YN_{33}	—	December 26, 2011	Kitt Peak	Spacewatch	·	970 m	MPC · JPL
575921	2011 YV_{33}	—	December 26, 2011	Kitt Peak	Spacewatch	·	560 m	MPC · JPL
575922	2011 YF_{36}	—	October 17, 2010	Mount Lemmon	Mount Lemmon Survey	VER	2.2 km	MPC · JPL
575923	2011 YA_{38}	—	December 26, 2011	Kitt Peak	Spacewatch	H	430 m	MPC · JPL
575924	2011 YX_{38}	—	November 27, 2011	Mount Lemmon	Mount Lemmon Survey	·	1.0 km	MPC · JPL
575925	2011 YZ_{38}	—	November 20, 2008	Mount Lemmon	Mount Lemmon Survey	·	580 m	MPC · JPL
575926	2011 YM_{41}	—	December 25, 2011	Mount Lemmon	Mount Lemmon Survey	URS	3.2 km	MPC · JPL
575927	2011 YX_{42}	—	December 27, 2011	Kitt Peak	Spacewatch	V	610 m	MPC · JPL
575928	2011 YW_{44}	—	December 27, 2011	Kitt Peak	Spacewatch	·	1.0 km	MPC · JPL
575929	2011 YU_{46}	—	October 14, 2010	Mount Lemmon	Mount Lemmon Survey	·	3.3 km	MPC · JPL
575930	2011 YO_{48}	—	December 29, 2011	Ka-Dar	Gerke, V.	·	3.1 km	MPC · JPL
575931	2011 YP_{49}	—	December 27, 2011	Kitt Peak	Spacewatch	·	550 m	MPC · JPL
575932	2011 YP_{56}	—	December 14, 2007	Dauban	C. Rinner, Kugel, F.	·	1.0 km	MPC · JPL
575933	2011 YF_{57}	—	October 12, 2007	Catalina	CSS	·	860 m	MPC · JPL
575934	2011 YJ_{58}	—	April 30, 2008	Kitt Peak	Spacewatch	EOS	1.7 km	MPC · JPL
575935	2011 YX_{61}	—	December 15, 2006	Kitt Peak	Spacewatch	·	3.1 km	MPC · JPL
575936	2011 YD_{63}	—	February 25, 2007	Catalina	CSS	H	540 m	MPC · JPL
575937	2011 YW_{67}	—	July 14, 2009	Kitt Peak	Spacewatch	·	3.0 km	MPC · JPL
575938	2011 YK_{68}	—	March 24, 2001	Kitt Peak	Spacewatch	·	1.2 km	MPC · JPL
575939	2011 YZ_{69}	—	December 30, 2011	Cala d'Hort	B. Linero, I. de la Cueva	·	1.6 km	MPC · JPL
575940	2011 YD_{70}	—	September 19, 2003	Palomar	NEAT	·	1.5 km	MPC · JPL
575941	2011 YO_{71}	—	November 29, 2011	Kitt Peak	Spacewatch	·	2.7 km	MPC · JPL
575942	2011 YV_{76}	—	December 29, 2011	Mount Lemmon	Mount Lemmon Survey	·	1.1 km	MPC · JPL
575943	2011 YB_{80}	—	November 5, 2007	Kitt Peak	Spacewatch	·	820 m	MPC · JPL
575944	2011 YZ_{81}	—	November 30, 2011	Catalina	CSS	LIX	3.4 km	MPC · JPL
575945	2011 YA_{82}	—	July 24, 2015	Haleakala	Pan-STARRS 1	·	2.1 km	MPC · JPL
575946	2011 YB_{82}	—	December 30, 2011	Kitt Peak	Spacewatch	·	2.8 km	MPC · JPL
575947	2011 YS_{82}	—	April 5, 2014	Haleakala	Pan-STARRS 1	·	3.0 km	MPC · JPL
575948	2011 YX_{82}	—	May 25, 2010	WISE	WISE	·	2.7 km	MPC · JPL
575949	2011 YJ_{85}	—	December 29, 2011	Mount Lemmon	Mount Lemmon Survey	T_{j} (2.97)	2.2 km	MPC · JPL
575950	2011 YD_{87}	—	February 17, 2018	Mount Lemmon	Mount Lemmon Survey	·	2.1 km	MPC · JPL
575951	2011 YL_{87}	—	December 27, 2011	Kitt Peak	Spacewatch	PHO	660 m	MPC · JPL
575952	2011 YZ_{87}	—	October 26, 2016	Mount Lemmon	Mount Lemmon Survey	·	2.6 km	MPC · JPL
575953	2011 YQ_{89}	—	July 24, 2015	Haleakala	Pan-STARRS 1	·	2.6 km	MPC · JPL
575954	2011 YR_{91}	—	December 31, 2011	Kitt Peak	Spacewatch	·	850 m	MPC · JPL
575955	2011 YY_{91}	—	December 25, 2011	Kitt Peak	Spacewatch	·	2.4 km	MPC · JPL
575956	2012 AX_{3}	—	January 1, 2012	Mount Lemmon	Mount Lemmon Survey	·	2.1 km	MPC · JPL
575957	2012 AJ_{8}	—	September 26, 2003	Apache Point	SDSS Collaboration	CLA	1.7 km	MPC · JPL
575958	2012 AE_{10}	—	January 5, 2012	Haleakala	Pan-STARRS 1	·	1.2 km	MPC · JPL
575959	2012 AJ_{11}	—	December 30, 2011	Mount Lemmon	Mount Lemmon Survey	TIR	2.1 km	MPC · JPL
575960	2012 AB_{12}	—	February 17, 2007	Catalina	CSS	TIR	3.5 km	MPC · JPL
575961	2012 AH_{13}	—	November 11, 1999	Kitt Peak	Spacewatch	MAS	780 m	MPC · JPL
575962	2012 AB_{15}	—	August 20, 2010	Siding Spring	SSS	T_{j} (2.99) · (895)	4.0 km	MPC · JPL
575963	2012 AC_{15}	—	December 26, 2011	Les Engarouines	L. Bernasconi	·	3.3 km	MPC · JPL
575964	2012 AV_{15}	—	December 7, 2005	Kitt Peak	Spacewatch	·	2.7 km	MPC · JPL
575965	2012 AK_{19}	—	August 20, 2010	Siding Spring	SSS	·	4.1 km	MPC · JPL
575966	2012 AC_{20}	—	January 3, 2012	Kitt Peak	Spacewatch	LIX	2.7 km	MPC · JPL
575967	2012 AJ_{22}	—	December 31, 2011	Kitt Peak	Spacewatch	PHO	880 m	MPC · JPL
575968	2012 AG_{26}	—	December 11, 2012	Kitt Peak	Spacewatch	L4	9.4 km	MPC · JPL
575969	2012 AH_{26}	—	July 30, 2014	Haleakala	Pan-STARRS 1	·	880 m	MPC · JPL
575970	2012 AO_{26}	—	June 19, 2010	WISE	WISE	·	2.7 km	MPC · JPL
575971	2012 AY_{26}	—	July 25, 2014	Haleakala	Pan-STARRS 1	·	3.2 km	MPC · JPL
575972	2012 AE_{29}	—	September 14, 2014	Mount Lemmon	Mount Lemmon Survey	·	1.1 km	MPC · JPL
575973	2012 AX_{30}	—	July 25, 2014	Haleakala	Pan-STARRS 1	·	850 m	MPC · JPL
575974	2012 AE_{31}	—	January 1, 2012	Mount Lemmon	Mount Lemmon Survey	·	460 m	MPC · JPL
575975	2012 AU_{31}	—	January 3, 2012	Mount Lemmon	Mount Lemmon Survey	·	2.7 km	MPC · JPL
575976	2012 AT_{32}	—	January 1, 2012	Mount Lemmon	Mount Lemmon Survey	·	2.1 km	MPC · JPL
575977	2012 AB_{34}	—	January 2, 2012	Mount Lemmon	Mount Lemmon Survey	·	1.0 km	MPC · JPL
575978	2012 AC_{34}	—	January 2, 2012	Kitt Peak	Spacewatch	·	950 m	MPC · JPL
575979	2012 BO_{3}	—	January 1, 2012	Mount Lemmon	Mount Lemmon Survey	·	1.3 km	MPC · JPL
575980	2012 BT_{3}	—	November 2, 2007	Mount Lemmon	Mount Lemmon Survey	·	1.1 km	MPC · JPL
575981	2012 BT_{4}	—	August 28, 2000	Cerro Tololo	Deep Ecliptic Survey	·	650 m	MPC · JPL
575982	2012 BB_{6}	—	April 30, 2005	Kitt Peak	Spacewatch	·	1.1 km	MPC · JPL
575983	2012 BC_{6}	—	October 2, 1999	Kitt Peak	Spacewatch	·	2.1 km	MPC · JPL
575984	2012 BH_{6}	—	December 29, 2011	Kitt Peak	Spacewatch	EOS	1.7 km	MPC · JPL
575985	2012 BL_{13}	—	January 19, 2012	Socorro	LINEAR	PHO	880 m	MPC · JPL
575986	2012 BR_{16}	—	February 4, 2005	Catalina	CSS	PHO	1.0 km	MPC · JPL
575987	2012 BQ_{18}	—	January 19, 2012	Haleakala	Pan-STARRS 1	·	1.3 km	MPC · JPL
575988	2012 BZ_{19}	—	January 21, 2012	Catalina	CSS	H	630 m	MPC · JPL
575989	2012 BQ_{23}	—	January 2, 2012	Mount Lemmon	Mount Lemmon Survey	H	460 m	MPC · JPL
575990	2012 BO_{26}	—	September 7, 2008	Mount Lemmon	Mount Lemmon Survey	L4	7.4 km	MPC · JPL
575991	2012 BC_{32}	—	January 3, 2012	Kitt Peak	Spacewatch	EOS	1.7 km	MPC · JPL
575992	2012 BH_{32}	—	December 21, 2006	Kitt Peak	L. H. Wasserman, M. W. Buie	EOS	2.0 km	MPC · JPL
575993	2012 BW_{33}	—	September 12, 2004	Kitt Peak	Spacewatch	·	3.6 km	MPC · JPL
575994	2012 BL_{35}	—	December 26, 2011	Mount Lemmon	Mount Lemmon Survey	TIR	2.4 km	MPC · JPL
575995	2012 BO_{36}	—	September 12, 2007	Kitt Peak	Spacewatch	·	590 m	MPC · JPL
575996	2012 BS_{45}	—	January 2, 2012	Kitt Peak	Spacewatch	·	720 m	MPC · JPL
575997	2012 BO_{49}	—	December 27, 2011	Mount Lemmon	Mount Lemmon Survey	·	2.5 km	MPC · JPL
575998	2012 BX_{50}	—	January 20, 2012	Mount Lemmon	Mount Lemmon Survey	·	1.1 km	MPC · JPL
575999	2012 BB_{58}	—	December 4, 2007	Mount Lemmon	Mount Lemmon Survey	·	930 m	MPC · JPL
576000	2012 BG_{59}	—	August 13, 2007	XuYi	PMO NEO Survey Program	·	750 m	MPC · JPL

back to top

== Meaning of names ==
As minor planet discoveries are confirmed, they are given a permanent number by the IAU's Minor Planet Center (MPC), and the discoverers can then submit names for them, following the IAU's naming conventions. The list below concerns those minor planets in the specified number-range that have received names, and explains the meanings of those names.

Official naming citations of newly named small Solar System bodies are approved and published in a bulletin by IAU's Working Group for Small Bodies Nomenclature (WGSBN). Before May 2021, citations were published in MPC's Minor Planet Circulars for many decades. Recent citations can also be found on the JPL Small-Body Database (SBDB). Until his death in 2016, German astronomer Lutz D. Schmadel compiled these citations into the Dictionary of Minor Planet Names (DMP) and regularly updated the collection.

Based on Paul Herget's The Names of the Minor Planets, Schmadel also researched the unclear origin of numerous asteroids, most of which had been named prior to World War II. This article incorporates text from this source, which is in the public domain: SBDB New namings may only be added to this list below after official publication as the preannouncement of names is condemned. The WGSBN publishes a comprehensive guideline for the naming rules of non-cometary small Solar System bodies.

Named minor planet	Provisional	This minor planet was named for...	Ref · Catalog
575108 Doyrantsi	2011 HK_{35}	Doyrantsi, a settlement in Shumen Province, Bulgaria, and the childhood home of the discoverer Sunay Ibryamov.	IAU · 575108
575195 Carpineti	2011 LG_{33}	Carpineti, a small town in the Province of Reggio Emilia, Italy.	IAU · 575195
575498 Lampérthgyula	2011 TW_{12}	Gyula Lampérth (1950–2001), a Hungarian teacher of physics and mathematics.	IAU · 575498
575511 Bükk	2011 US_{31}	The Bükk Mountains, a part of the North Hungarian Mountains of the Inner Western Carpathians.	IAU · 575511
