= Kaolinovo =

Kaolinovo Каолиново
- Location of Kaolinovo
- Coordinates: 43°37′N 27°07′E
- Country: Bulgaria
- Provinces (Oblast): Shumen

Government
  - Mayor: Nida Ahmedov
- Elevation: 284 m (932 ft)

Population (December 2009)
  - Total: 1,538
- Time zone: UTC+2 (EET)
  - Summer (DST): UTC+3 (EEST)
- Postal Code: 9960
- Area code: 05361

Kaolinovo (Bulgarian: Каолиново, pronounced [kɐoˈlinovo]) is a town in northeastern Bulgaria, part of Shumen Province. It is the administrative centre of the homonymous Kaolinovo Municipality, which lies in the northern part of Shumen Province. As of December 2009, the town had a population of 1,538.

Kaolinovo was named after its main product: the municipality is rich in high-quality kaolin (china clay), with a mine and an ore dressing plant present. The reserves amount to 65 million tonnes.

== Municipality ==
Kaolinovo municipality includes the following 16 places:

- Branichevo
- Doyrantsi
- Dolina
- Gusla
- Kaolinovo
- Kliment
- Lisi Vrah
- Lyatno
- Naum
- Omarchevo
- Pristoe
- Sini Vir
- Sredkovets
- Takach
- Todor Ikonomovo
- Zagoriche
