= Thronium family =

The Thronium family (006) is a small collisional asteroid family of at least 15 known asteroids, named for its largest member, the 68-kilometre (42 mi)-across asteroid 9799 Thronium. It lies within the larger dynamical group of Jupiter trojans, a group of asteroids in an orbital resonance with Jupiter such that they stay about 60 degrees ahead of/behind the planet in its orbit at all times in the Lagrange points L4 and L5, with the Thronium family being part of the leading cloud around L4, also known as the Greek camp. All members of the family are dark (assumed to be C-type asteroids) with albedos of around 0.06.

An asteroid family is a group of physically related asteroids usually created by a collision with an original larger asteroid, with the fragments continuing on similar orbits to the original. This is distinct from a dynamical group in that the members of a dynamical group only share similar orbits because of gravitational interactions with planets, which concentrate asteroids in a particular orbital range. Members of the Thronium family are both part of the wider Trojan dynamical group, and fragments of 9799 Thronium. The family is considered a non-catastrophic asteroid family because 9799 Thronium, its largest member, makes up nearly all of the family's total mass, rather than simply being the largest of a number of fragments each making up a small fraction of the original destroyed asteroid.

== Large members ==

- 9799 Thronium: 3.27 (92.3%)
- (89938) 2002 FR4: 0.0665 (1.9%)
- (226027) 2002 EK127: 0.0458 (1.3%)
- (254691) 2005 MG24: 0.0282 (0.8%)
- (243316) 2008 RL32: 0.0278 (0.8%)
- (589224) 2009 RK63: 0.0229 (0.6%)
- (388876) 2008 RE29: 0.0223 (0.6%)
- (728930) 2010 VX23: 0.0214 (0.6%)
- (432637) 2010 VK170: 0.0194 (0.5%)
- (392189) 2009 SR30: 0.0174 (0.5%)
Mass distribution of the Thronium family (assuming similar densities)

The 10 brightest Thronium family members
Name	Abs. Mag	Size (km)	proper a (AU)	proper e	proper i
9799 Thronium	9.67	68	5.2252	0.040	31.743
(89938) 2002 FR4	12.49	19	5.2324	0.039	31.941
(226027) 2002 EK127	12.76	13	5.2316	0.040	31.868
(254691) 2005 MG24	13.11	14	5.2275	0.039	31.572
(243316) 2008 RL32	13.12	11	5.2340	0.040	31.893
(589244) 2009 RK63	13.26	13	?	0.048	31.729
(388876) 2008 RE29	13.28	13	5.2268	0.040	31.771
(728930) 2010 VX23	13.31	12	?	0.048	31.635
(432637) 2010 VK170	13.38	12	?	0.048	31.769
(392189) 2009 SR30	13.46	12	5.2361	0.041	31.818
