= Kaolinovo Municipality =

Kaolinovo Municipality Община Каолиново
- Municipality
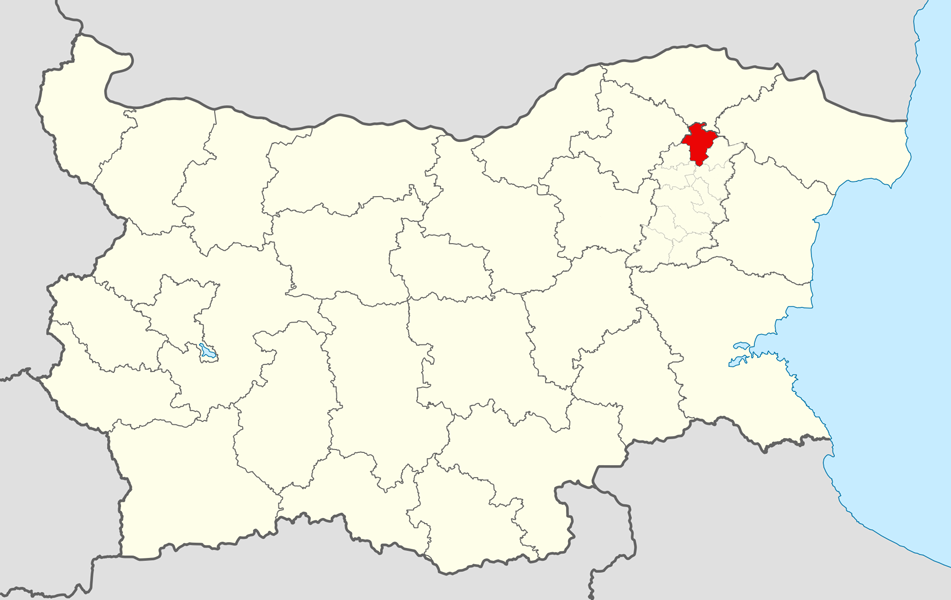
- Kaolinovo Municipality within Bulgaria and Shumen Province.
- Coordinates: 43°35′N 27°5′E
- Country: Bulgaria
- Province (Oblast): Shumen
- Admin. centre (Obshtinski tsentar): Kaolinovo

Area
  - Total: 293.53 km^{2} (113.33 sq mi)

Population (December 2017)▲
  - Total: 12,646
  - Density: 43.082/km^{2} (111.58/sq mi)
- Time zone: UTC+2 (EET)
  - Summer (DST): UTC+3 (EEST)

Kaolinovo Municipality (Bulgarian: Община Каолиново) is a municipality (obshtina) in Shumen Province, Northeastern Bulgaria, located in the Ludogorie geographical region, part of the Danubian Plain. It is named after its administrative centre – the town of Kaolinovo.

The municipality embraces a territory of 293 km^{2} (113 sq mi) with a population of 12,646 inhabitants, as of December 2017.

== Settlements ==
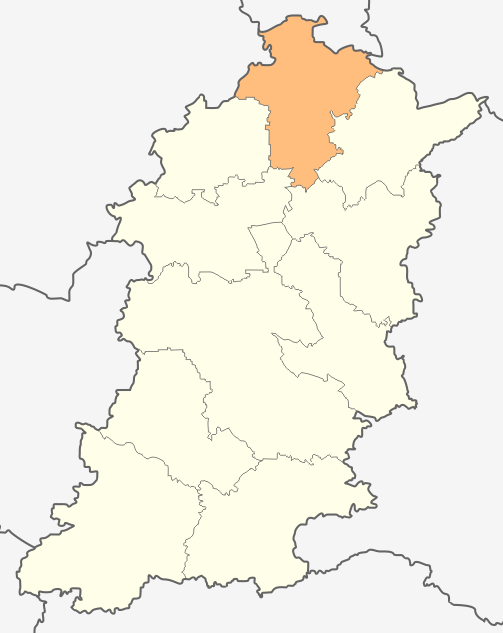
Kaolinovo Municipality within Shumen Province

Kaolinovo Municipality includes the following 16 places (towns are shown in bold):

Town/Village	Cyrillic	Population (December 2009)
**Kaolinovo**	**Каолиново**	1,538
Branichevo	Браничево	1,220
Doyrantsi	Дойранци	535
Dolina	Долина	503
Gusla	Гусла	664
Kliment	Климент	1019
Lisi Vrah	Лиси връх	69
Lyatno	Лятно	584
Naum	Наум	433
Omarchevo	Омарчево	38
Pristoe	Пристое	983
Sini Vir	Сини вир	604
Sredkovets	Средковец	642
Todor Ikonomovo	Тодор Икономово	2,027
Takach	Тъкач	718
Zagoriche	Загориче	674
Total		12,251

== Demography ==
The following table shows the change of the population during the last four decades.

Kaolinovo Municipality
**Year**	1975	1985	1992	**2001**	2005	2007	2009	**2011**
**Population**	20,916	19,382	13,556	12,544	12,518	12,456	12,251	12,093
Sources: Census 2001, Census 2011, „pop-stat.mashke.org“,

=== Ethnic composition ===
According to the 2011 census, among those who answered the optional question on ethnic identification, the ethnic composition of the municipality was the following:

Ethnic group	Population	Percentage
Bulgarians	722	6.3%
Turks	8964	77.6%
Roma (Gypsy)	1675	14.5%
Other	12	0.1%
Undeclared	175	1.5%

More than three-quarters of the population of Kaolinovo Municipality consists of ethnic Turks. The second largest ethnic group are the Turkish-speaking Roma people with one in seven people. Bulgarians make up a very small minority.

Ethnic groups in Kaolinovo Municipality (2011 census)
Ethnic group	Percentage
Bulgarians	6.3%
Turks	77.6%
Roma	14.5%
others and indefinable	1.6%

=== Religion ===
According to the latest Bulgarian census of 2011, the religious composition, among those who answered the optional question on religious identification, was the following:

Religious composition of Municipality
Orthodox Christianity	5.1%
Catholicism	0.0%
Protestantism	0.1%
Islam	90.1%
No religion	0.6%
Prefer not to answer, others and indefinable	4.1%

The municipality of Kaolinovo has one of the highest concentrations of Muslims in Bulgaria.

=== Demographic situation ===
The municipality of Kaolinovo had relatively favourable demographic indicators compared to other areas in Bulgaria, although it has become worse.

	Population	Live births	Deaths	Natural growth	Birth rate (‰)	Death rate (‰)	Natural growth rate (‰)
2000	13,593	157	152	+5	11.6	11.2	+0.4
2001	12,481	166	175	−9	13.3	14.0	−0.7
2002	12,511	160	190	−30	12.8	15.2	−2.4
2003	12,555	168	147	+21	13.4	11.7	+1.7
2004	12,551	158	152	+6	12.6	12.1	+0.5
2005	12,518	147	165	−18	11.7	13.2	−1.4
2006	12,482	148	166	−18	11.9	13.3	−1.4
2007	12,456	172	185	−13	13.8	14.9	−1.0
2008	12,323	121	160	−39	9.8	12.9	−3.2
2009	12,251	169	167	+2	13.8	13.6	+0.2
2010	12,248	156	173	−17	12.7	14.1	−1.4
2011	12,107	141	146	−5	11.6	12.1	−0.4
2012	12,200	175	153	+22	14.3	12.5	+1.8
2013	12,298	144	144	+0	11.7	11.7	+0.0
2014	12,490	153	146	+7	12.2	11.7	+0.6
2015	12,522	142	161	−19	11.3	12.9	−1.5
2016	12,551	134	150	−16	10.7	12.0	−1.3
2017	12,646	117	155	−38	9.3	12.3	−3.0
2018	12,771	124	187	-63	9.7	14.6	-4.9

== See also ==
- Provinces of Bulgaria
- Municipalities of Bulgaria
- List of cities and towns in Bulgaria
