= List of minor planets: 722001–723000 =

The following is a partial list of minor planets, running from minor-planet number 722001 through 723000, inclusive. The primary data for this and other partial lists is based on JPL's "Small-Body Orbital Elements" and data available from the Minor Planet Center. Critical list information is also provided by the MPC, unless otherwise specified from Lowell Observatory. A detailed description of the table's columns and additional sources are given on the main page including a complete list of every page in this series, and a statistical break-up on the dynamical classification of minor planets.

Also see the summary list of all named bodies in numerical and alphabetical order, and the corresponding naming citations for the number range of this particular list. New namings may only be added to this list after official publication, as the preannouncement of names is condemned by the Working Group for Small Bodies Nomenclature of the International Astronomical Union.

Near-Earth obj.	MBA (inner)	MBA (outer)	Centaur
Mars-crosser	MBA (middle)	Jupiter trojan	Trans-Neptunian obj.
Unclassified

== 722001–722100 ==
Designation			Discovery			Properties		Ref
Permanent	Provisional	Named after	Date	Site	Discoverer(s)	Category	Diam.	Ref
722001	2004 XZ_{195}	—	December 12, 2004	Kitt Peak	Spacewatch	·	2.5 km	MPC · JPL
722002	2004 XP_{196}	—	November 10, 2009	Catalina	CSS	·	2.9 km	MPC · JPL
722003	2004 XF_{198}	—	January 8, 2010	Mount Lemmon	Mount Lemmon Survey	·	1.6 km	MPC · JPL
722004	2004 XC_{199}	—	November 21, 2008	Mount Lemmon	Mount Lemmon Survey	·	1.2 km	MPC · JPL
722005	2004 YC_{17}	—	December 19, 2004	Mount Lemmon	Mount Lemmon Survey	·	1.6 km	MPC · JPL
722006	2004 YD_{17}	—	December 19, 2004	Mount Lemmon	Mount Lemmon Survey	·	1.3 km	MPC · JPL
722007	2004 YX_{17}	—	December 19, 2004	Mount Lemmon	Mount Lemmon Survey	·	1.2 km	MPC · JPL
722008	2004 YD_{26}	—	December 19, 2004	Mount Lemmon	Mount Lemmon Survey	·	1.3 km	MPC · JPL
722009	2004 YX_{26}	—	December 19, 2004	Mount Lemmon	Mount Lemmon Survey	·	2.6 km	MPC · JPL
722010	2004 YB_{29}	—	December 16, 2004	Kitt Peak	Spacewatch	·	2.0 km	MPC · JPL
722011	2004 YS_{34}	—	December 18, 2004	Mount Lemmon	Mount Lemmon Survey	·	3.5 km	MPC · JPL
722012	2004 YY_{37}	—	September 13, 2007	Catalina	CSS	·	650 m	MPC · JPL
722013	2004 YQ_{38}	—	December 1, 2008	Kitt Peak	Spacewatch	(5)	1.0 km	MPC · JPL
722014	2004 YA_{39}	—	September 26, 2014	Mount Lemmon	Mount Lemmon Survey	·	2.2 km	MPC · JPL
722015	2004 YD_{39}	—	January 31, 2010	WISE	WISE	·	2.2 km	MPC · JPL
722016	2004 YE_{39}	—	December 20, 2004	Mount Lemmon	Mount Lemmon Survey	(5651)	3.0 km	MPC · JPL
722017	2004 YQ_{39}	—	November 26, 2009	Kitt Peak	Spacewatch	EOS	1.5 km	MPC · JPL
722018	2004 YW_{39}	—	October 19, 2012	Mount Lemmon	Mount Lemmon Survey	·	1.1 km	MPC · JPL
722019	2004 YL_{40}	—	October 26, 2009	Mount Lemmon	Mount Lemmon Survey	·	2.9 km	MPC · JPL
722020	2004 YD_{41}	—	November 26, 2009	Kitt Peak	Spacewatch	·	2.0 km	MPC · JPL
722021	2004 YW_{41}	—	December 18, 2004	Mount Lemmon	Mount Lemmon Survey	·	1.0 km	MPC · JPL
722022	2005 AW_{28}	—	January 15, 2005	Socorro	LINEAR	·	1.5 km	MPC · JPL
722023	2005 AT_{40}	—	January 15, 2005	Socorro	LINEAR	·	3.3 km	MPC · JPL
722024	2005 AY_{48}	—	January 13, 2005	Kitt Peak	Spacewatch	·	1.9 km	MPC · JPL
722025	2005 AT_{59}	—	October 5, 2003	Kitt Peak	Spacewatch	·	2.1 km	MPC · JPL
722026	2005 AP_{63}	—	January 13, 2005	Kitt Peak	Spacewatch	·	730 m	MPC · JPL
722027	2005 AN_{64}	—	January 13, 2005	Kitt Peak	Spacewatch	·	1.6 km	MPC · JPL
722028	2005 AX_{65}	—	December 20, 2004	Mount Lemmon	Mount Lemmon Survey	·	2.4 km	MPC · JPL
722029	2005 AD_{74}	—	January 15, 2005	Kitt Peak	Spacewatch	·	3.1 km	MPC · JPL
722030	2005 AF_{77}	—	January 15, 2005	Kitt Peak	Spacewatch	(1118)	4.0 km	MPC · JPL
722031	2005 AZ_{78}	—	January 15, 2005	Kitt Peak	Spacewatch	·	1.2 km	MPC · JPL
722032	2005 AG_{83}	—	January 7, 2005	Campo Imperatore	CINEOS	·	3.3 km	MPC · JPL
722033	2005 AL_{83}	—	March 29, 2008	Kitt Peak	Spacewatch	L5	8.7 km	MPC · JPL
722034	2005 AE_{84}	—	September 10, 2016	Mount Lemmon	Mount Lemmon Survey	·	1.2 km	MPC · JPL
722035	2005 AO_{84}	—	November 20, 2014	Haleakala	Pan-STARRS 1	·	2.5 km	MPC · JPL
722036	2005 AR_{84}	—	November 29, 2014	Mount Lemmon	Mount Lemmon Survey	L5	9.0 km	MPC · JPL
722037	2005 BV_{3}	—	January 16, 2005	Kitt Peak	Spacewatch	·	2.2 km	MPC · JPL
722038	2005 BV_{31}	—	January 19, 2005	Kitt Peak	Spacewatch	KOR	1.3 km	MPC · JPL
722039	2005 BY_{31}	—	January 16, 2005	Mauna Kea	Veillet, C.	·	2.4 km	MPC · JPL
722040	2005 BC_{33}	—	January 16, 2005	Mauna Kea	Veillet, C.	ADE	2.1 km	MPC · JPL
722041	2005 BM_{34}	—	January 18, 2005	Kitt Peak	Spacewatch	·	2.9 km	MPC · JPL
722042	2005 BN_{38}	—	January 16, 2005	Mauna Kea	Veillet, C.	·	1.2 km	MPC · JPL
722043	2005 BL_{41}	—	January 16, 2005	Mauna Kea	Veillet, C.	(8737)	2.1 km	MPC · JPL
722044	2005 BR_{50}	—	November 4, 2007	Kitt Peak	Spacewatch	·	510 m	MPC · JPL
722045	2005 BY_{50}	—	January 17, 2005	Kitt Peak	Spacewatch	·	2.4 km	MPC · JPL
722046	2005 BX_{51}	—	March 25, 2010	WISE	WISE	·	2.7 km	MPC · JPL
722047	2005 BY_{51}	—	December 12, 2012	Mount Lemmon	Mount Lemmon Survey	EUN	950 m	MPC · JPL
722048	2005 BA_{52}	—	February 27, 2010	WISE	WISE	·	3.0 km	MPC · JPL
722049	2005 BO_{52}	—	November 1, 2013	Mount Lemmon	Mount Lemmon Survey	·	810 m	MPC · JPL
722050	2005 BS_{52}	—	January 16, 2005	Kitt Peak	Spacewatch	ADE	1.8 km	MPC · JPL
722051	2005 BC_{53}	—	January 12, 2016	Haleakala	Pan-STARRS 1	·	2.1 km	MPC · JPL
722052	2005 BD_{53}	—	February 27, 2010	WISE	WISE	T_{j} (2.99)	2.7 km	MPC · JPL
722053	2005 BL_{56}	—	June 8, 2012	Mount Lemmon	Mount Lemmon Survey	·	2.0 km	MPC · JPL
722054	2005 BN_{56}	—	April 14, 2010	WISE	WISE	L5	10 km	MPC · JPL
722055	2005 CD_{10}	—	February 1, 2005	Kitt Peak	Spacewatch	·	2.4 km	MPC · JPL
722056	2005 CM_{17}	—	February 2, 2005	Socorro	LINEAR	·	1.5 km	MPC · JPL
722057	2005 CR_{44}	—	February 2, 2005	Kitt Peak	Spacewatch	·	3.7 km	MPC · JPL
722058	2005 CF_{63}	—	September 19, 2003	Palomar	NEAT	·	3.9 km	MPC · JPL
722059	2005 CO_{69}	—	February 14, 2005	Kitt Peak	Spacewatch	·	2.4 km	MPC · JPL
722060	2005 CC_{72}	—	February 1, 2005	Kitt Peak	Spacewatch	·	2.6 km	MPC · JPL
722061	2005 CW_{74}	—	October 19, 2003	Kitt Peak	Spacewatch	·	2.7 km	MPC · JPL
722062	2005 CW_{82}	—	September 20, 2007	Kitt Peak	Spacewatch	·	2.4 km	MPC · JPL
722063 Andrasz	2005 CO_{83}	Andrasz	May 3, 2013	Mount Graham	K. Černis, R. P. Boyle	·	910 m	MPC · JPL
722064	2005 CD_{86}	—	April 3, 2016	Haleakala	Pan-STARRS 1	·	1.8 km	MPC · JPL
722065	2005 CZ_{86}	—	April 13, 2011	Mount Lemmon	Mount Lemmon Survey	·	2.0 km	MPC · JPL
722066	2005 CB_{88}	—	February 25, 2011	Kitt Peak	Spacewatch	·	1.9 km	MPC · JPL
722067	2005 CC_{88}	—	December 29, 2014	Haleakala	Pan-STARRS 1	·	1.7 km	MPC · JPL
722068	2005 CL_{88}	—	January 18, 2013	Kitt Peak	Spacewatch	MAR	790 m	MPC · JPL
722069	2005 CB_{89}	—	February 4, 2005	Kitt Peak	Spacewatch	L5	10 km	MPC · JPL
722070	2005 CC_{89}	—	October 30, 2008	Mount Lemmon	Mount Lemmon Survey	JUN	850 m	MPC · JPL
722071	2005 CE_{89}	—	May 6, 2014	Mount Lemmon	Mount Lemmon Survey	·	1.0 km	MPC · JPL
722072	2005 CJ_{89}	—	February 4, 2005	Mount Lemmon	Mount Lemmon Survey	·	2.2 km	MPC · JPL
722073	2005 CP_{89}	—	February 9, 2005	Kitt Peak	Spacewatch	·	1.3 km	MPC · JPL
722074	2005 DU_{3}	—	February 16, 2005	La Silla	A. Boattini	·	2.5 km	MPC · JPL
722075	2005 DG_{4}	—	February 18, 2005	La Silla	A. Boattini	·	2.5 km	MPC · JPL
722076	2005 DN_{4}	—	October 1, 2009	Mount Lemmon	Mount Lemmon Survey	·	2.2 km	MPC · JPL
722077	2005 DP_{4}	—	April 2, 2010	WISE	WISE	·	2.7 km	MPC · JPL
722078	2005 ER_{10}	—	March 2, 2005	Kitt Peak	Spacewatch	·	2.3 km	MPC · JPL
722079	2005 EY_{17}	—	March 3, 2005	Kitt Peak	Spacewatch	·	2.4 km	MPC · JPL
722080	2005 EJ_{42}	—	January 16, 2005	Kitt Peak	Spacewatch	·	1.7 km	MPC · JPL
722081	2005 ET_{51}	—	March 3, 2005	Catalina	CSS	·	1.5 km	MPC · JPL
722082	2005 EE_{54}	—	March 4, 2005	Kitt Peak	Spacewatch	(5)	1.1 km	MPC · JPL
722083	2005 EE_{56}	—	March 4, 2005	Kitt Peak	Spacewatch	·	2.3 km	MPC · JPL
722084	2005 EA_{61}	—	March 4, 2005	Catalina	CSS	·	5.4 km	MPC · JPL
722085	2005 EF_{63}	—	March 4, 2005	Mount Lemmon	Mount Lemmon Survey	·	2.5 km	MPC · JPL
722086	2005 EQ_{64}	—	March 4, 2005	Mount Lemmon	Mount Lemmon Survey	·	1.4 km	MPC · JPL
722087	2005 EW_{74}	—	March 3, 2005	Kitt Peak	Spacewatch	·	2.2 km	MPC · JPL
722088	2005 EL_{75}	—	March 3, 2005	Kitt Peak	Spacewatch	·	2.2 km	MPC · JPL
722089	2005 EL_{77}	—	March 3, 2005	Catalina	CSS	·	1.3 km	MPC · JPL
722090	2005 EQ_{92}	—	March 8, 2005	Mount Lemmon	Mount Lemmon Survey	·	2.3 km	MPC · JPL
722091	2005 EZ_{96}	—	March 3, 2005	Nogales	M. Ory	·	2.7 km	MPC · JPL
722092	2005 EA_{104}	—	March 4, 2005	Kitt Peak	Spacewatch	TIR	2.7 km	MPC · JPL
722093	2005 EY_{109}	—	March 4, 2005	Mount Lemmon	Mount Lemmon Survey	·	2.0 km	MPC · JPL
722094	2005 EA_{115}	—	March 4, 2005	Kitt Peak	Spacewatch	·	1.2 km	MPC · JPL
722095	2005 EY_{120}	—	March 8, 2005	Kitt Peak	Spacewatch	·	2.9 km	MPC · JPL
722096	2005 EE_{155}	—	March 8, 2005	Mount Lemmon	Mount Lemmon Survey	H	410 m	MPC · JPL
722097	2005 EV_{158}	—	March 9, 2005	Mount Lemmon	Mount Lemmon Survey	·	3.0 km	MPC · JPL
722098	2005 ED_{159}	—	March 9, 2005	Mount Lemmon	Mount Lemmon Survey	·	2.5 km	MPC · JPL
722099	2005 ER_{162}	—	March 10, 2005	Mount Lemmon	Mount Lemmon Survey	·	2.0 km	MPC · JPL
722100	2005 EJ_{164}	—	March 11, 2005	Kitt Peak	Spacewatch	EUN	950 m	MPC · JPL

== 722101–722200 ==
back to top

Designation			Discovery			Properties		Ref
Permanent	Provisional	Named after	Date	Site	Discoverer(s)	Category	Diam.	Ref
722101	2005 ED_{170}	—	March 10, 2005	Catalina	CSS	·	3.2 km	MPC · JPL
722102	2005 EM_{191}	—	March 11, 2005	Mount Lemmon	Mount Lemmon Survey	·	1.1 km	MPC · JPL
722103	2005 EB_{195}	—	March 11, 2005	Mount Lemmon	Mount Lemmon Survey	·	2.3 km	MPC · JPL
722104	2005 EO_{201}	—	March 8, 2005	Catalina	CSS	BRA	2.1 km	MPC · JPL
722105	2005 EM_{202}	—	March 8, 2005	Catalina	CSS	·	3.4 km	MPC · JPL
722106	2005 EC_{221}	—	March 11, 2005	Mount Lemmon	Mount Lemmon Survey	·	1.2 km	MPC · JPL
722107	2005 EU_{221}	—	March 12, 2005	Mount Lemmon	Mount Lemmon Survey	·	3.1 km	MPC · JPL
722108	2005 EO_{225}	—	March 9, 2005	Mount Lemmon	Mount Lemmon Survey	·	2.7 km	MPC · JPL
722109	2005 ET_{228}	—	January 19, 2005	Kitt Peak	Spacewatch	·	3.0 km	MPC · JPL
722110	2005 EM_{233}	—	March 10, 2005	Anderson Mesa	LONEOS	·	2.7 km	MPC · JPL
722111	2005 EZ_{236}	—	March 11, 2005	Kitt Peak	Spacewatch	·	1.0 km	MPC · JPL
722112	2005 EC_{239}	—	March 11, 2005	Kitt Peak	Spacewatch	·	1.8 km	MPC · JPL
722113	2005 ET_{239}	—	March 11, 2005	Kitt Peak	Spacewatch	·	1.2 km	MPC · JPL
722114	2005 EH_{244}	—	March 11, 2005	Mount Lemmon	Mount Lemmon Survey	EOS	1.4 km	MPC · JPL
722115	2005 EX_{251}	—	March 10, 2005	Mount Lemmon	Mount Lemmon Survey	·	3.3 km	MPC · JPL
722116	2005 ED_{255}	—	March 11, 2005	Mount Lemmon	Mount Lemmon Survey	·	1.3 km	MPC · JPL
722117	2005 ES_{259}	—	March 11, 2005	Mount Lemmon	Mount Lemmon Survey	·	660 m	MPC · JPL
722118	2005 EF_{277}	—	March 9, 2005	Anderson Mesa	LONEOS	·	3.3 km	MPC · JPL
722119	2005 EC_{288}	—	January 19, 2012	Kitt Peak	Spacewatch	·	860 m	MPC · JPL
722120	2005 EJ_{293}	—	March 10, 2005	Moletai	K. Černis, Zdanavicius, J.	VER	2.5 km	MPC · JPL
722121	2005 EA_{294}	—	February 17, 2010	Mount Lemmon	Mount Lemmon Survey	·	3.1 km	MPC · JPL
722122	2005 EM_{306}	—	March 8, 2005	Mount Lemmon	Mount Lemmon Survey	·	2.0 km	MPC · JPL
722123	2005 EW_{306}	—	March 8, 2005	Mount Lemmon	Mount Lemmon Survey	·	2.0 km	MPC · JPL
722124	2005 EG_{308}	—	September 10, 2007	Mount Lemmon	Mount Lemmon Survey	·	2.3 km	MPC · JPL
722125	2005 ET_{308}	—	March 9, 2005	Mount Lemmon	Mount Lemmon Survey	NEM	1.7 km	MPC · JPL
722126	2005 EK_{313}	—	March 10, 2005	Mount Lemmon	Mount Lemmon Survey	·	1.6 km	MPC · JPL
722127	2005 EG_{315}	—	March 11, 2005	Mount Lemmon	Mount Lemmon Survey	·	1.3 km	MPC · JPL
722128	2005 EB_{325}	—	August 9, 2007	Kitt Peak	Spacewatch	·	1.2 km	MPC · JPL
722129	2005 ET_{329}	—	March 4, 2005	Mount Lemmon	Mount Lemmon Survey	·	1.7 km	MPC · JPL
722130	2005 EP_{332}	—	March 9, 2005	Mount Lemmon	Mount Lemmon Survey	·	2.5 km	MPC · JPL
722131	2005 EY_{335}	—	September 28, 2013	Mount Lemmon	Mount Lemmon Survey	·	1.9 km	MPC · JPL
722132	2005 EK_{337}	—	February 25, 2011	Kitt Peak	Spacewatch	·	2.4 km	MPC · JPL
722133	2005 EO_{337}	—	May 17, 2010	WISE	WISE	·	1.4 km	MPC · JPL
722134	2005 EW_{337}	—	April 21, 2010	WISE	WISE	·	3.9 km	MPC · JPL
722135	2005 EY_{337}	—	March 12, 2005	Kitt Peak	Spacewatch	·	2.2 km	MPC · JPL
722136	2005 EK_{338}	—	July 4, 2010	WISE	WISE	BRU	2.7 km	MPC · JPL
722137	2005 EN_{340}	—	February 16, 2012	Haleakala	Pan-STARRS 1	·	590 m	MPC · JPL
722138	2005 EZ_{341}	—	March 11, 2005	Mount Lemmon	Mount Lemmon Survey	·	1.2 km	MPC · JPL
722139	2005 EC_{342}	—	September 18, 2011	Mount Lemmon	Mount Lemmon Survey	·	1.4 km	MPC · JPL
722140	2005 EO_{344}	—	August 19, 2006	Kitt Peak	Spacewatch	·	590 m	MPC · JPL
722141	2005 EM_{346}	—	August 12, 2013	Haleakala	Pan-STARRS 1	·	680 m	MPC · JPL
722142	2005 EX_{346}	—	February 1, 2010	WISE	WISE	WAT	1.6 km	MPC · JPL
722143	2005 EZ_{346}	—	February 5, 2016	Haleakala	Pan-STARRS 1	VER	2.0 km	MPC · JPL
722144	2005 EA_{348}	—	March 12, 2005	Kitt Peak	Spacewatch	·	2.1 km	MPC · JPL
722145	2005 EH_{348}	—	March 12, 2005	Kitt Peak	Spacewatch	·	1.4 km	MPC · JPL
722146	2005 ES_{348}	—	March 11, 2005	Mount Lemmon	Mount Lemmon Survey	·	870 m	MPC · JPL
722147	2005 EA_{351}	—	March 10, 2005	Mount Lemmon	Mount Lemmon Survey	·	1.8 km	MPC · JPL
722148	2005 EC_{352}	—	March 10, 2005	Kitt Peak	Deep Ecliptic Survey	·	1.3 km	MPC · JPL
722149	2005 FK_{16}	—	March 16, 2005	Mount Lemmon	Mount Lemmon Survey	THM	3.1 km	MPC · JPL
722150	2005 FD_{17}	—	April 5, 2011	Kitt Peak	Spacewatch	·	2.5 km	MPC · JPL
722151	2005 FK_{17}	—	April 1, 2011	Kitt Peak	Spacewatch	·	2.5 km	MPC · JPL
722152	2005 FZ_{17}	—	March 18, 2005	Catalina	CSS	·	2.8 km	MPC · JPL
722153	2005 FC_{18}	—	December 31, 2008	Kitt Peak	Spacewatch	EUN	1.0 km	MPC · JPL
722154	2005 FL_{18}	—	October 8, 2007	Mount Lemmon	Mount Lemmon Survey	·	1.2 km	MPC · JPL
722155	2005 FW_{19}	—	March 17, 2005	Mount Lemmon	Mount Lemmon Survey	·	1.0 km	MPC · JPL
722156	2005 GZ_{14}	—	April 2, 2005	Mount Lemmon	Mount Lemmon Survey	·	3.4 km	MPC · JPL
722157	2005 GC_{16}	—	March 11, 2005	Mount Lemmon	Mount Lemmon Survey	·	1.3 km	MPC · JPL
722158	2005 GN_{28}	—	April 4, 2005	Mount Lemmon	Mount Lemmon Survey	·	2.5 km	MPC · JPL
722159	2005 GR_{29}	—	March 11, 2005	Kitt Peak	Deep Ecliptic Survey	THM	2.3 km	MPC · JPL
722160	2005 GP_{32}	—	April 4, 2005	Mount Lemmon	Mount Lemmon Survey	ADE	1.6 km	MPC · JPL
722161	2005 GW_{40}	—	April 4, 2005	Mount Lemmon	Mount Lemmon Survey	·	3.7 km	MPC · JPL
722162	2005 GQ_{43}	—	April 5, 2005	Palomar	NEAT	·	2.2 km	MPC · JPL
722163	2005 GP_{49}	—	April 5, 2005	Mount Lemmon	Mount Lemmon Survey	·	2.0 km	MPC · JPL
722164	2005 GS_{62}	—	April 2, 2005	Mount Lemmon	Mount Lemmon Survey	·	1.7 km	MPC · JPL
722165	2005 GB_{71}	—	April 4, 2005	Kitt Peak	Spacewatch	·	3.2 km	MPC · JPL
722166	2005 GX_{78}	—	March 10, 2005	Mount Lemmon	Mount Lemmon Survey	·	590 m	MPC · JPL
722167	2005 GO_{82}	—	April 4, 2005	Mount Lemmon	Mount Lemmon Survey	·	740 m	MPC · JPL
722168	2005 GK_{92}	—	April 6, 2005	Kitt Peak	Spacewatch	·	4.1 km	MPC · JPL
722169	2005 GM_{101}	—	April 9, 2005	Kitt Peak	Spacewatch	·	1.5 km	MPC · JPL
722170	2005 GV_{103}	—	April 9, 2005	Mount Lemmon	Mount Lemmon Survey	MAS	550 m	MPC · JPL
722171	2005 GB_{108}	—	April 10, 2005	Mount Lemmon	Mount Lemmon Survey	VER	2.5 km	MPC · JPL
722172	2005 GR_{108}	—	April 10, 2005	Mount Lemmon	Mount Lemmon Survey	·	880 m	MPC · JPL
722173	2005 GC_{109}	—	April 10, 2005	Mount Lemmon	Mount Lemmon Survey	HYG	2.6 km	MPC · JPL
722174	2005 GE_{110}	—	April 10, 2005	Mount Lemmon	Mount Lemmon Survey	NYS	950 m	MPC · JPL
722175	2005 GB_{118}	—	April 11, 2005	Mount Lemmon	Mount Lemmon Survey	·	2.4 km	MPC · JPL
722176	2005 GH_{119}	—	March 10, 2005	Catalina	CSS	T_{j} (2.9)	3.1 km	MPC · JPL
722177	2005 GD_{140}	—	April 11, 2005	Mount Lemmon	Mount Lemmon Survey	·	950 m	MPC · JPL
722178	2005 GQ_{144}	—	April 2, 2005	Kitt Peak	Spacewatch	·	2.8 km	MPC · JPL
722179	2005 GD_{157}	—	April 10, 2005	Mount Lemmon	Mount Lemmon Survey	·	2.8 km	MPC · JPL
722180	2005 GH_{166}	—	April 11, 2005	Mount Lemmon	Mount Lemmon Survey	·	1.3 km	MPC · JPL
722181	2005 GS_{166}	—	April 4, 2014	Mount Lemmon	Mount Lemmon Survey	·	1.4 km	MPC · JPL
722182	2005 GH_{172}	—	April 2, 2005	Kitt Peak	Spacewatch	·	1.3 km	MPC · JPL
722183	2005 GS_{172}	—	April 14, 2005	Kitt Peak	Spacewatch	·	2.7 km	MPC · JPL
722184	2005 GR_{191}	—	April 12, 2005	Kitt Peak	Deep Ecliptic Survey	·	2.1 km	MPC · JPL
722185	2005 GV_{199}	—	April 10, 2005	Kitt Peak	Deep Ecliptic Survey	·	2.5 km	MPC · JPL
722186	2005 GD_{203}	—	March 11, 2005	Kitt Peak	Spacewatch	·	3.1 km	MPC · JPL
722187	2005 GQ_{203}	—	April 9, 2005	Mount Lemmon	Mount Lemmon Survey	AST	1.6 km	MPC · JPL
722188	2005 GK_{204}	—	April 10, 2005	Mount Lemmon	Mount Lemmon Survey	·	560 m	MPC · JPL
722189	2005 GP_{216}	—	April 1, 2005	Kitt Peak	Spacewatch	·	1.9 km	MPC · JPL
722190	2005 GZ_{216}	—	April 2, 2005	Palomar	NEAT	·	1.7 km	MPC · JPL
722191	2005 GQ_{218}	—	April 2, 2005	Mount Lemmon	Mount Lemmon Survey	·	660 m	MPC · JPL
722192	2005 GE_{221}	—	March 11, 2005	Mount Lemmon	Mount Lemmon Survey	·	740 m	MPC · JPL
722193	2005 GL_{221}	—	April 6, 2005	Kitt Peak	Spacewatch	·	2.2 km	MPC · JPL
722194	2005 GQ_{224}	—	October 23, 2013	Mount Lemmon	Mount Lemmon Survey	·	2.5 km	MPC · JPL
722195	2005 GA_{228}	—	April 6, 2005	Mount Lemmon	Mount Lemmon Survey	·	2.5 km	MPC · JPL
722196	2005 GZ_{230}	—	September 14, 2013	Haleakala	Pan-STARRS 1	·	1.1 km	MPC · JPL
722197	2005 GQ_{231}	—	December 15, 2009	Mount Lemmon	Mount Lemmon Survey	·	2.2 km	MPC · JPL
722198	2005 GC_{232}	—	April 1, 2005	Kitt Peak	Spacewatch	·	2.7 km	MPC · JPL
722199	2005 GZ_{232}	—	November 20, 2014	Mount Lemmon	Mount Lemmon Survey	·	2.4 km	MPC · JPL
722200	2005 GO_{233}	—	November 1, 2008	Kitt Peak	Spacewatch	·	2.4 km	MPC · JPL

== 722201–722300 ==
back to top

Designation			Discovery			Properties		Ref
Permanent	Provisional	Named after	Date	Site	Discoverer(s)	Category	Diam.	Ref
722201	2005 GQ_{234}	—	October 3, 2014	Haleakala	Pan-STARRS 1	·	2.7 km	MPC · JPL
722202	2005 GS_{234}	—	September 30, 2011	Kitt Peak	Spacewatch	·	1.3 km	MPC · JPL
722203	2005 GU_{234}	—	April 1, 2005	Anderson Mesa	LONEOS	·	1.4 km	MPC · JPL
722204	2005 GY_{234}	—	March 18, 2018	Haleakala	Pan-STARRS 1	·	1.1 km	MPC · JPL
722205	2005 GU_{236}	—	March 10, 2005	Mount Lemmon	Mount Lemmon Survey	·	2.4 km	MPC · JPL
722206	2005 GR_{238}	—	April 11, 2005	Mount Lemmon	Mount Lemmon Survey	3:2	5.0 km	MPC · JPL
722207	2005 GN_{241}	—	April 7, 2005	Kitt Peak	Spacewatch	MAS	580 m	MPC · JPL
722208	2005 HH_{11}	—	July 2, 2010	WISE	WISE	TEL	1.3 km	MPC · JPL
722209	2005 HR_{11}	—	May 30, 2010	WISE	WISE	VER	2.8 km	MPC · JPL
722210	2005 HR_{12}	—	April 16, 2005	Kitt Peak	Spacewatch	·	1.9 km	MPC · JPL
722211	2005 JK_{6}	—	May 4, 2005	Mauna Kea	Veillet, C.	AST	1.4 km	MPC · JPL
722212	2005 JW_{8}	—	May 4, 2005	Mauna Kea	Veillet, C.	·	520 m	MPC · JPL
722213	2005 JP_{13}	—	April 4, 2005	Mount Lemmon	Mount Lemmon Survey	·	1.8 km	MPC · JPL
722214	2005 JO_{18}	—	April 17, 2005	Kitt Peak	Spacewatch	·	990 m	MPC · JPL
722215	2005 JM_{19}	—	May 4, 2005	Mount Lemmon	Mount Lemmon Survey	·	2.4 km	MPC · JPL
722216	2005 JR_{28}	—	May 3, 2005	Kitt Peak	Spacewatch	·	1.2 km	MPC · JPL
722217	2005 JD_{33}	—	April 11, 2005	Mount Lemmon	Mount Lemmon Survey	·	4.0 km	MPC · JPL
722218	2005 JH_{41}	—	May 7, 2005	Mount Lemmon	Mount Lemmon Survey	·	2.9 km	MPC · JPL
722219	2005 JR_{41}	—	May 7, 2005	Mount Lemmon	Mount Lemmon Survey	·	3.3 km	MPC · JPL
722220	2005 JE_{43}	—	May 8, 2005	Mount Lemmon	Mount Lemmon Survey	MAS	570 m	MPC · JPL
722221	2005 JS_{45}	—	May 3, 2005	Kitt Peak	D. E. Trilling, A. S. Rivkin	·	3.4 km	MPC · JPL
722222	2005 JW_{45}	—	May 3, 2005	Kitt Peak	D. E. Trilling, A. S. Rivkin	H	420 m	MPC · JPL
722223	2005 JJ_{53}	—	May 4, 2005	Mount Lemmon	Mount Lemmon Survey	·	1.5 km	MPC · JPL
722224	2005 JU_{62}	—	May 9, 2005	Mount Lemmon	Mount Lemmon Survey	MAS	560 m	MPC · JPL
722225	2005 JU_{63}	—	May 3, 2005	Kitt Peak	D. E. Trilling, A. S. Rivkin	T_{j} (2.97) · EUP	3.1 km	MPC · JPL
722226	2005 JW_{66}	—	May 4, 2005	Catalina	CSS	·	2.2 km	MPC · JPL
722227	2005 JD_{80}	—	May 10, 2005	Mount Lemmon	Mount Lemmon Survey	VER	2.5 km	MPC · JPL
722228	2005 JK_{80}	—	May 10, 2005	Kitt Peak	Spacewatch	TIR	2.5 km	MPC · JPL
722229	2005 JA_{81}	—	February 16, 2002	Palomar	NEAT	H	520 m	MPC · JPL
722230	2005 JB_{81}	—	May 4, 2005	Kitt Peak	D. E. Trilling, A. S. Rivkin	PHO	1.0 km	MPC · JPL
722231	2005 JF_{83}	—	May 8, 2005	Kitt Peak	Spacewatch	·	1.8 km	MPC · JPL
722232	2005 JT_{85}	—	May 8, 2005	Mount Lemmon	Mount Lemmon Survey	·	3.2 km	MPC · JPL
722233	2005 JV_{86}	—	March 14, 2005	Mount Lemmon	Mount Lemmon Survey	·	2.8 km	MPC · JPL
722234	2005 JZ_{91}	—	April 9, 2005	Siding Spring	SSS	·	4.1 km	MPC · JPL
722235	2005 JC_{92}	—	January 12, 1994	Kitt Peak	Spacewatch	·	2.5 km	MPC · JPL
722236	2005 JQ_{94}	—	May 7, 2005	Mount Lemmon	Mount Lemmon Survey	·	3.3 km	MPC · JPL
722237	2005 JX_{98}	—	May 4, 2005	Anderson Mesa	LONEOS	·	2.4 km	MPC · JPL
722238	2005 JQ_{99}	—	January 28, 2000	Kitt Peak	Spacewatch	·	1.3 km	MPC · JPL
722239	2005 JZ_{107}	—	May 12, 2005	Mount Lemmon	Mount Lemmon Survey	·	4.1 km	MPC · JPL
722240	2005 JX_{110}	—	May 8, 2005	Kitt Peak	Spacewatch	·	1.5 km	MPC · JPL
722241	2005 JD_{114}	—	April 16, 2005	Kitt Peak	Spacewatch	THM	2.2 km	MPC · JPL
722242	2005 JZ_{118}	—	May 10, 2005	Mount Lemmon	Mount Lemmon Survey	·	1.9 km	MPC · JPL
722243	2005 JE_{129}	—	May 13, 2005	Kitt Peak	Spacewatch	·	2.6 km	MPC · JPL
722244	2005 JM_{135}	—	September 19, 2000	Kitt Peak	Spacewatch	H	430 m	MPC · JPL
722245	2005 JY_{137}	—	May 13, 2005	Kitt Peak	Spacewatch	·	2.9 km	MPC · JPL
722246	2005 JF_{147}	—	May 15, 2005	Mount Lemmon	Mount Lemmon Survey	·	2.7 km	MPC · JPL
722247	2005 JR_{153}	—	May 4, 2005	Kitt Peak	Spacewatch	·	3.4 km	MPC · JPL
722248	2005 JB_{156}	—	May 4, 2005	Palomar	NEAT	·	2.7 km	MPC · JPL
722249	2005 JT_{158}	—	May 6, 2005	Kitt Peak	Spacewatch	·	2.2 km	MPC · JPL
722250	2005 JS_{164}	—	April 4, 2005	Mount Lemmon	Mount Lemmon Survey	·	3.7 km	MPC · JPL
722251	2005 JO_{166}	—	May 11, 2005	Palomar	NEAT	·	2.6 km	MPC · JPL
722252	2005 JC_{180}	—	May 11, 2005	Socorro	LINEAR	·	2.4 km	MPC · JPL
722253	2005 JQ_{180}	—	March 3, 2009	Kitt Peak	Spacewatch	·	1.1 km	MPC · JPL
722254	2005 JT_{186}	—	April 17, 2005	Kitt Peak	Spacewatch	·	3.2 km	MPC · JPL
722255	2005 JE_{187}	—	April 7, 2005	Kitt Peak	Spacewatch	·	2.3 km	MPC · JPL
722256	2005 JU_{188}	—	February 9, 2010	WISE	WISE	·	2.0 km	MPC · JPL
722257	2005 JH_{189}	—	August 15, 2013	Haleakala	Pan-STARRS 1	MAS	570 m	MPC · JPL
722258	2005 JP_{189}	—	November 13, 2006	Catalina	CSS	·	1.2 km	MPC · JPL
722259	2005 JR_{189}	—	April 30, 2016	Mount Lemmon	Mount Lemmon Survey	MAS	520 m	MPC · JPL
722260	2005 JZ_{190}	—	February 29, 2012	Mount Graham	Boyle, R. P., V. Laugalys	MAS	520 m	MPC · JPL
722261	2005 JH_{191}	—	May 13, 2010	Mount Lemmon	Mount Lemmon Survey	·	2.5 km	MPC · JPL
722262	2005 JL_{191}	—	May 7, 2005	Mount Lemmon	Mount Lemmon Survey	·	1.7 km	MPC · JPL
722263	2005 JZ_{191}	—	March 13, 2012	Mount Lemmon	Mount Lemmon Survey	MAS	580 m	MPC · JPL
722264	2005 JB_{194}	—	January 7, 2010	WISE	WISE	·	2.6 km	MPC · JPL
722265	2005 JG_{194}	—	January 6, 2010	Kitt Peak	Spacewatch	·	2.8 km	MPC · JPL
722266	2005 KC	—	May 16, 2005	Reedy Creek	J. Broughton	·	2.2 km	MPC · JPL
722267	2005 KU_{1}	—	May 16, 2005	Mount Lemmon	Mount Lemmon Survey	·	1.8 km	MPC · JPL
722268	2005 KM_{8}	—	May 16, 2005	Kitt Peak	Spacewatch	·	2.0 km	MPC · JPL
722269	2005 KK_{15}	—	June 14, 2010	WISE	WISE	·	3.0 km	MPC · JPL
722270	2005 KC_{16}	—	November 12, 2007	Mount Lemmon	Mount Lemmon Survey	·	2.6 km	MPC · JPL
722271	2005 LZ_{4}	—	May 4, 2005	Kitt Peak	Spacewatch	·	470 m	MPC · JPL
722272	2005 LT_{22}	—	June 8, 2005	Kitt Peak	Spacewatch	·	880 m	MPC · JPL
722273	2005 LJ_{27}	—	May 3, 2005	Kitt Peak	Spacewatch	·	2.4 km	MPC · JPL
722274	2005 LY_{28}	—	May 8, 2005	Mount Lemmon	Mount Lemmon Survey	·	1.6 km	MPC · JPL
722275	2005 LL_{29}	—	June 10, 2005	Kitt Peak	Spacewatch	·	1.9 km	MPC · JPL
722276	2005 LN_{30}	—	June 12, 2005	Kitt Peak	Spacewatch	·	1.0 km	MPC · JPL
722277	2005 LN_{31}	—	June 8, 2005	Kitt Peak	Spacewatch	DOR	1.6 km	MPC · JPL
722278	2005 LX_{34}	—	June 10, 2005	Kitt Peak	Spacewatch	·	1.6 km	MPC · JPL
722279	2005 LX_{47}	—	June 14, 2005	Kitt Peak	Spacewatch	·	890 m	MPC · JPL
722280	2005 LN_{48}	—	May 15, 2005	Palomar	NEAT	H	600 m	MPC · JPL
722281	2005 LM_{54}	—	October 20, 2006	Kitt Peak	Spacewatch	·	620 m	MPC · JPL
722282	2005 LQ_{55}	—	June 8, 2005	Kitt Peak	Spacewatch	·	3.4 km	MPC · JPL
722283	2005 LK_{56}	—	May 25, 2010	WISE	WISE	EUN	1.1 km	MPC · JPL
722284	2005 LN_{56}	—	March 10, 2010	WISE	WISE	·	1.9 km	MPC · JPL
722285	2005 LP_{56}	—	September 20, 2001	Kitt Peak	Spacewatch	VER	2.6 km	MPC · JPL
722286	2005 LN_{58}	—	January 2, 2019	Haleakala	Pan-STARRS 1	·	790 m	MPC · JPL
722287	2005 LO_{58}	—	October 2, 2006	Mount Lemmon	Mount Lemmon Survey	KOR	1.1 km	MPC · JPL
722288	2005 LA_{59}	—	June 3, 2005	Kitt Peak	Spacewatch	·	970 m	MPC · JPL
722289	2005 LO_{59}	—	June 18, 2013	Haleakala	Pan-STARRS 1	3:2 · SHU	4.0 km	MPC · JPL
722290	2005 LQ_{59}	—	August 10, 2016	Haleakala	Pan-STARRS 1	·	540 m	MPC · JPL
722291	2005 LB_{60}	—	January 21, 2015	Haleakala	Pan-STARRS 1	PHO	800 m	MPC · JPL
722292	2005 MA_{16}	—	June 11, 2005	Catalina	CSS	EUN	1.6 km	MPC · JPL
722293	2005 MK_{51}	—	June 30, 2005	Kitt Peak	Spacewatch	·	3.9 km	MPC · JPL
722294	2005 MR_{55}	—	March 16, 2012	Haleakala	Pan-STARRS 1	·	1.0 km	MPC · JPL
722295	2005 NN_{6}	—	July 4, 2005	Mount Lemmon	Mount Lemmon Survey	·	680 m	MPC · JPL
722296	2005 NW_{18}	—	July 4, 2005	Mount Lemmon	Mount Lemmon Survey	NYS	850 m	MPC · JPL
722297	2005 NC_{19}	—	July 4, 2005	Mount Lemmon	Mount Lemmon Survey	·	2.8 km	MPC · JPL
722298	2005 NG_{23}	—	July 4, 2005	Kitt Peak	Spacewatch	·	1.3 km	MPC · JPL
722299	2005 NY_{23}	—	July 4, 2005	Kitt Peak	Spacewatch	·	1.7 km	MPC · JPL
722300	2005 NP_{47}	—	July 7, 2005	Kitt Peak	Spacewatch	·	1.7 km	MPC · JPL

== 722301–722400 ==
back to top

Designation			Discovery			Properties		Ref
Permanent	Provisional	Named after	Date	Site	Discoverer(s)	Category	Diam.	Ref
722301	2005 NB_{55}	—	July 1, 2005	Kitt Peak	Spacewatch	·	1.3 km	MPC · JPL
722302	2005 NO_{62}	—	July 11, 2005	Kitt Peak	Spacewatch	·	620 m	MPC · JPL
722303	2005 NK_{65}	—	July 1, 2005	Kitt Peak	Spacewatch	·	2.5 km	MPC · JPL
722304	2005 NN_{75}	—	July 10, 2005	Kitt Peak	Spacewatch	·	2.1 km	MPC · JPL
722305	2005 NE_{76}	—	June 14, 2005	Mount Lemmon	Mount Lemmon Survey	·	1.7 km	MPC · JPL
722306	2005 NV_{77}	—	July 1, 2005	Kitt Peak	Spacewatch	GEF	1.1 km	MPC · JPL
722307	2005 NH_{81}	—	July 11, 2005	Kitt Peak	Spacewatch	·	2.1 km	MPC · JPL
722308	2005 NZ_{85}	—	July 3, 2005	Mount Lemmon	Mount Lemmon Survey	·	3.0 km	MPC · JPL
722309	2005 NW_{88}	—	July 4, 2005	Mount Lemmon	Mount Lemmon Survey	·	1.5 km	MPC · JPL
722310	2005 NS_{93}	—	July 6, 2005	Kitt Peak	Spacewatch	·	2.0 km	MPC · JPL
722311	2005 NO_{100}	—	July 15, 2005	Mount Lemmon	Mount Lemmon Survey	·	2.0 km	MPC · JPL
722312	2005 NK_{104}	—	July 7, 2005	Mauna Kea	Veillet, C.	·	740 m	MPC · JPL
722313	2005 NJ_{110}	—	July 7, 2005	Mauna Kea	Veillet, C.	ELF	2.8 km	MPC · JPL
722314	2005 NP_{113}	—	November 11, 2001	Apache Point	SDSS Collaboration	EOS	1.5 km	MPC · JPL
722315	2005 NL_{118}	—	July 7, 2005	Mauna Kea	Veillet, C.	·	970 m	MPC · JPL
722316	2005 NM_{122}	—	July 1, 2005	Kitt Peak	Spacewatch	·	1.2 km	MPC · JPL
722317	2005 NO_{125}	—	January 13, 2010	WISE	WISE	L4 · 006	10 km	MPC · JPL
722318	2005 NX_{126}	—	July 11, 2005	Mount Lemmon	Mount Lemmon Survey	NYS	840 m	MPC · JPL
722319	2005 NH_{128}	—	January 17, 2007	Kitt Peak	Spacewatch	·	1.0 km	MPC · JPL
722320	2005 NR_{128}	—	July 3, 2005	Catalina	CSS	·	1.5 km	MPC · JPL
722321	2005 NA_{130}	—	January 10, 2008	Kitt Peak	Spacewatch	·	1.8 km	MPC · JPL
722322	2005 NH_{130}	—	April 13, 2018	Haleakala	Pan-STARRS 1	EUN	1.0 km	MPC · JPL
722323	2005 NZ_{130}	—	February 17, 2013	Mount Lemmon	Mount Lemmon Survey	·	1.9 km	MPC · JPL
722324	2005 NE_{132}	—	July 30, 2010	WISE	WISE	·	3.5 km	MPC · JPL
722325	2005 NS_{133}	—	March 21, 2018	Mount Lemmon	Mount Lemmon Survey	·	1.5 km	MPC · JPL
722326	2005 OG_{16}	—	July 11, 2005	Mount Lemmon	Mount Lemmon Survey	·	2.0 km	MPC · JPL
722327	2005 OU_{16}	—	August 31, 2000	Kitt Peak	Spacewatch	·	2.3 km	MPC · JPL
722328	2005 OS_{32}	—	March 16, 2010	WISE	WISE	·	2.9 km	MPC · JPL
722329	2005 OY_{32}	—	June 25, 2010	WISE	WISE	WAT	1.8 km	MPC · JPL
722330	2005 OB_{33}	—	July 29, 2005	Palomar	NEAT	·	770 m	MPC · JPL
722331	2005 OF_{33}	—	July 30, 2005	Palomar	NEAT	·	2.5 km	MPC · JPL
722332	2005 PR	—	August 2, 2005	Kambah	Herald, D.	·	1.7 km	MPC · JPL
722333	2005 PG_{12}	—	July 28, 2005	Palomar	NEAT	·	3.9 km	MPC · JPL
722334	2005 PE_{24}	—	August 29, 2005	Kitt Peak	Spacewatch	·	1.7 km	MPC · JPL
722335	2005 PF_{25}	—	August 5, 2005	Mauna Kea	P. A. Wiegert, D. D. Balam	·	1.6 km	MPC · JPL
722336	2005 PT_{28}	—	August 6, 2005	Palomar	NEAT	·	3.0 km	MPC · JPL
722337	2005 PH_{30}	—	March 9, 2010	WISE	WISE	(5651)	2.9 km	MPC · JPL
722338	2005 QT_{29}	—	January 28, 2003	Kitt Peak	Spacewatch	·	3.8 km	MPC · JPL
722339	2005 QF_{40}	—	July 31, 2005	Palomar	NEAT	DOR	2.4 km	MPC · JPL
722340	2005 QJ_{40}	—	August 27, 2005	Anderson Mesa	LONEOS	·	2.9 km	MPC · JPL
722341	2005 QG_{47}	—	August 28, 2005	Kitt Peak	Spacewatch	NYS	1.0 km	MPC · JPL
722342	2005 QO_{103}	—	August 29, 2005	Kitt Peak	Spacewatch	·	1.5 km	MPC · JPL
722343	2005 QD_{122}	—	August 28, 2005	Kitt Peak	Spacewatch	MRX	970 m	MPC · JPL
722344	2005 QP_{123}	—	August 28, 2005	Kitt Peak	Spacewatch	·	1.2 km	MPC · JPL
722345	2005 QP_{129}	—	August 28, 2005	Kitt Peak	Spacewatch	·	700 m	MPC · JPL
722346	2005 QW_{130}	—	August 28, 2005	Kitt Peak	Spacewatch	EOS	3.5 km	MPC · JPL
722347	2005 QH_{132}	—	August 28, 2005	Kitt Peak	Spacewatch	AEO	950 m	MPC · JPL
722348	2005 QR_{143}	—	August 28, 2005	St. Véran	St. Veran	·	2.0 km	MPC · JPL
722349	2005 QV_{144}	—	August 27, 2005	Palomar	NEAT	·	3.7 km	MPC · JPL
722350	2005 QZ_{145}	—	August 27, 2005	Palomar	NEAT	NAE	2.9 km	MPC · JPL
722351	2005 QA_{160}	—	July 30, 2005	Palomar	NEAT	·	3.1 km	MPC · JPL
722352	2005 QA_{163}	—	August 30, 2005	Anderson Mesa	LONEOS	·	1.9 km	MPC · JPL
722353	2005 QC_{167}	—	August 26, 2005	Palomar	NEAT	·	2.5 km	MPC · JPL
722354	2005 QU_{168}	—	August 30, 2005	Palomar	NEAT	·	2.2 km	MPC · JPL
722355	2005 QF_{169}	—	August 30, 2005	Palomar	NEAT	·	2.6 km	MPC · JPL
722356	2005 QS_{183}	—	August 30, 2005	Mauna Kea	P. A. Wiegert	·	1.9 km	MPC · JPL
722357	2005 QU_{183}	—	August 30, 2005	Mauna Kea	P. A. Wiegert	·	1.7 km	MPC · JPL
722358	2005 QF_{185}	—	August 30, 2005	Mauna Kea	P. A. Wiegert	·	1.3 km	MPC · JPL
722359	2005 QF_{192}	—	January 27, 2007	Kitt Peak	Spacewatch	LIX	3.0 km	MPC · JPL
722360	2005 QN_{193}	—	September 22, 2009	Mount Lemmon	Mount Lemmon Survey	·	1.1 km	MPC · JPL
722361	2005 QP_{193}	—	September 15, 2010	Front Royal	Skillman, D.	KOR	1.2 km	MPC · JPL
722362	2005 QQ_{193}	—	August 30, 2005	Kitt Peak	Spacewatch	·	1.1 km	MPC · JPL
722363	2005 QL_{194}	—	March 27, 2008	Mount Lemmon	Mount Lemmon Survey	·	940 m	MPC · JPL
722364	2005 QM_{196}	—	August 24, 2005	Palomar	NEAT	·	2.2 km	MPC · JPL
722365	2005 QB_{198}	—	October 14, 2010	Mount Lemmon	Mount Lemmon Survey	·	1.9 km	MPC · JPL
722366	2005 QJ_{198}	—	February 26, 2008	Mount Lemmon	Mount Lemmon Survey	·	3.7 km	MPC · JPL
722367	2005 QM_{201}	—	January 4, 2012	Kitt Peak	Spacewatch	·	1.7 km	MPC · JPL
722368	2005 QT_{201}	—	October 10, 2015	Haleakala	Pan-STARRS 1	·	1.7 km	MPC · JPL
722369	2005 QH_{203}	—	August 30, 2005	Palomar	NEAT	NYS	1.0 km	MPC · JPL
722370	2005 QP_{207}	—	August 30, 2005	Campo Imperatore	CINEOS	MAS	590 m	MPC · JPL
722371	2005 QA_{210}	—	August 27, 2005	Palomar	NEAT	·	2.2 km	MPC · JPL
722372	2005 RG_{17}	—	September 1, 2005	Kitt Peak	Spacewatch	·	1.1 km	MPC · JPL
722373	2005 RR_{38}	—	August 30, 2005	Palomar	NEAT	BRA	1.3 km	MPC · JPL
722374	2005 RF_{52}	—	September 11, 2005	Kitt Peak	Spacewatch	MAS	670 m	MPC · JPL
722375	2005 RT_{53}	—	June 11, 2010	WISE	WISE	NAE	1.9 km	MPC · JPL
722376	2005 RE_{54}	—	May 27, 1993	Kitt Peak	Spacewatch	·	3.2 km	MPC · JPL
722377	2005 RN_{54}	—	May 9, 2010	WISE	WISE	·	2.5 km	MPC · JPL
722378	2005 RM_{55}	—	October 26, 2009	Kitt Peak	Spacewatch	·	1.0 km	MPC · JPL
722379	2005 RJ_{57}	—	September 17, 2010	Kitt Peak	Spacewatch	KOR	1.0 km	MPC · JPL
722380	2005 RK_{58}	—	October 10, 2010	Mount Lemmon	Mount Lemmon Survey	·	1.3 km	MPC · JPL
722381	2005 RN_{58}	—	April 7, 2008	Kitt Peak	Spacewatch	·	1.1 km	MPC · JPL
722382	2005 RL_{61}	—	September 11, 2005	Kitt Peak	Spacewatch	·	1.1 km	MPC · JPL
722383	2005 SL_{31}	—	September 23, 2005	Kitt Peak	Spacewatch	·	1.6 km	MPC · JPL
722384	2005 SD_{46}	—	August 30, 2005	Palomar	NEAT	BRA	1.4 km	MPC · JPL
722385	2005 SW_{58}	—	September 26, 2005	Kitt Peak	Spacewatch	·	1.3 km	MPC · JPL
722386	2005 SX_{89}	—	September 24, 2005	Kitt Peak	Spacewatch	·	860 m	MPC · JPL
722387	2005 SX_{98}	—	September 25, 2005	Kitt Peak	Spacewatch	·	1.0 km	MPC · JPL
722388	2005 SM_{130}	—	August 31, 2005	Palomar	NEAT	·	2.3 km	MPC · JPL
722389	2005 SD_{135}	—	September 24, 2005	Kitt Peak	Spacewatch	·	2.1 km	MPC · JPL
722390	2005 SQ_{194}	—	September 1, 2005	Kitt Peak	Spacewatch	NYS	860 m	MPC · JPL
722391	2005 SU_{202}	—	September 30, 2005	Mount Lemmon	Mount Lemmon Survey	·	880 m	MPC · JPL
722392	2005 SO_{206}	—	September 30, 2005	Mount Lemmon	Mount Lemmon Survey	THM	1.9 km	MPC · JPL
722393	2005 SX_{225}	—	August 19, 2001	Cerro Tololo	Deep Ecliptic Survey	NYS	1.0 km	MPC · JPL
722394	2005 SK_{239}	—	August 27, 2005	Palomar	NEAT	·	3.1 km	MPC · JPL
722395	2005 SX_{240}	—	September 25, 2005	Kitt Peak	Spacewatch	·	1.8 km	MPC · JPL
722396	2005 SU_{242}	—	November 12, 2001	Apache Point	SDSS Collaboration	·	1.3 km	MPC · JPL
722397	2005 SF_{244}	—	September 30, 2005	Mount Lemmon	Mount Lemmon Survey	·	3.3 km	MPC · JPL
722398	2005 SA_{258}	—	October 1, 2005	Kitt Peak	Spacewatch	·	1.4 km	MPC · JPL
722399	2005 SM_{272}	—	September 29, 2005	Mount Lemmon	Mount Lemmon Survey	·	1.5 km	MPC · JPL
722400	2005 SO_{272}	—	September 29, 2005	Kitt Peak	Spacewatch	·	2.6 km	MPC · JPL

== 722401–722500 ==
back to top

Designation			Discovery			Properties		Ref
Permanent	Provisional	Named after	Date	Site	Discoverer(s)	Category	Diam.	Ref
722401	2005 SD_{277}	—	September 30, 2005	Kitt Peak	Spacewatch	·	2.6 km	MPC · JPL
722402	2005 SH_{285}	—	September 28, 2005	Apache Point	SDSS Collaboration	·	800 m	MPC · JPL
722403	2005 SU_{285}	—	October 1, 2005	Apache Point	SDSS Collaboration	·	2.2 km	MPC · JPL
722404	2005 SQ_{292}	—	September 3, 2000	Apache Point	SDSS Collaboration	HOF	2.2 km	MPC · JPL
722405	2005 SL_{293}	—	March 13, 2003	Kitt Peak	Spacewatch	·	2.4 km	MPC · JPL
722406	2005 SA_{294}	—	January 13, 2010	WISE	WISE	PHO	1.6 km	MPC · JPL
722407	2005 SM_{297}	—	September 17, 2010	Mount Lemmon	Mount Lemmon Survey	GEF	980 m	MPC · JPL
722408	2005 SV_{297}	—	April 8, 2010	Kitt Peak	Spacewatch	·	3.2 km	MPC · JPL
722409	2005 SN_{299}	—	September 29, 2005	Kitt Peak	Spacewatch	·	2.4 km	MPC · JPL
722410	2005 SH_{300}	—	May 26, 2010	WISE	WISE	·	2.3 km	MPC · JPL
722411	2005 SJ_{301}	—	September 25, 2005	Kitt Peak	Spacewatch	·	1.4 km	MPC · JPL
722412	2005 SU_{303}	—	September 30, 2005	Mount Lemmon	Mount Lemmon Survey	·	2.5 km	MPC · JPL
722413	2005 SR_{304}	—	September 30, 2005	Mount Lemmon	Mount Lemmon Survey	·	450 m	MPC · JPL
722414	2005 TR_{20}	—	October 1, 2005	Mount Lemmon	Mount Lemmon Survey	·	3.4 km	MPC · JPL
722415	2005 TQ_{30}	—	September 11, 2005	Kitt Peak	Spacewatch	·	1.5 km	MPC · JPL
722416	2005 TT_{30}	—	August 29, 2005	Kitt Peak	Spacewatch	·	2.3 km	MPC · JPL
722417	2005 TS_{34}	—	October 1, 2005	Kitt Peak	Spacewatch	·	1.0 km	MPC · JPL
722418	2005 TS_{35}	—	October 1, 2005	Kitt Peak	Spacewatch	·	1.4 km	MPC · JPL
722419	2005 TZ_{38}	—	October 1, 2005	Mount Lemmon	Mount Lemmon Survey	LUT	3.1 km	MPC · JPL
722420	2005 TC_{41}	—	October 2, 2005	Mount Lemmon	Mount Lemmon Survey	·	2.4 km	MPC · JPL
722421	2005 TK_{47}	—	September 30, 2005	Anderson Mesa	LONEOS	PHO	710 m	MPC · JPL
722422	2005 TJ_{56}	—	October 1, 2005	Mount Lemmon	Mount Lemmon Survey	·	1.4 km	MPC · JPL
722423	2005 TF_{57}	—	October 1, 2005	Mount Lemmon	Mount Lemmon Survey	KOR	1.0 km	MPC · JPL
722424	2005 TE_{67}	—	October 5, 2005	Mount Lemmon	Mount Lemmon Survey	·	1.3 km	MPC · JPL
722425	2005 TT_{84}	—	October 3, 2005	Kitt Peak	Spacewatch	·	2.5 km	MPC · JPL
722426	2005 TT_{89}	—	September 14, 2005	Kitt Peak	Spacewatch	EUN	990 m	MPC · JPL
722427	2005 TA_{95}	—	October 6, 2005	Kitt Peak	Spacewatch	3:2	5.7 km	MPC · JPL
722428	2005 TA_{96}	—	October 6, 2005	Mount Lemmon	Mount Lemmon Survey	MRX	840 m	MPC · JPL
722429	2005 TZ_{99}	—	October 7, 2005	Mount Lemmon	Mount Lemmon Survey	·	520 m	MPC · JPL
722430	2005 TM_{114}	—	October 7, 2005	Kitt Peak	Spacewatch	·	1.4 km	MPC · JPL
722431	2005 TB_{124}	—	October 7, 2005	Kitt Peak	Spacewatch	·	830 m	MPC · JPL
722432	2005 TY_{133}	—	October 13, 1999	Apache Point	SDSS Collaboration	·	3.5 km	MPC · JPL
722433	2005 TW_{139}	—	September 29, 2005	Kitt Peak	Spacewatch	NYS	860 m	MPC · JPL
722434	2005 TA_{147}	—	October 8, 2005	Kitt Peak	Spacewatch	·	2.9 km	MPC · JPL
722435	2005 TS_{151}	—	October 10, 2005	Junk Bond	D. Healy	EOS	1.4 km	MPC · JPL
722436	2005 TX_{157}	—	September 29, 2005	Kitt Peak	Spacewatch	EUN	920 m	MPC · JPL
722437	2005 TL_{159}	—	October 1, 2005	Mount Lemmon	Mount Lemmon Survey	·	1.3 km	MPC · JPL
722438	2005 TT_{178}	—	October 3, 2005	Kitt Peak	Spacewatch	·	890 m	MPC · JPL
722439	2005 TE_{183}	—	October 13, 1999	Apache Point	SDSS Collaboration	·	2.8 km	MPC · JPL
722440	2005 TY_{184}	—	October 1, 2005	Mount Lemmon	Mount Lemmon Survey	NYS	970 m	MPC · JPL
722441	2005 TM_{187}	—	October 6, 2005	Mount Lemmon	Mount Lemmon Survey	·	2.5 km	MPC · JPL
722442	2005 TU_{201}	—	May 8, 2010	WISE	WISE	·	3.6 km	MPC · JPL
722443	2005 TW_{201}	—	October 24, 2009	Kitt Peak	Spacewatch	NYS	890 m	MPC · JPL
722444	2005 TV_{202}	—	October 12, 2005	Kitt Peak	Spacewatch	MAS	620 m	MPC · JPL
722445	2005 TD_{203}	—	June 27, 2014	Haleakala	Pan-STARRS 1	KOR	1.0 km	MPC · JPL
722446	2005 TY_{206}	—	October 7, 2005	Kitt Peak	Spacewatch	·	1.3 km	MPC · JPL
722447	2005 TF_{207}	—	January 31, 2014	Haleakala	Pan-STARRS 1	·	850 m	MPC · JPL
722448	2005 TW_{209}	—	September 18, 2014	Haleakala	Pan-STARRS 1	AGN	890 m	MPC · JPL
722449	2005 TB_{210}	—	June 22, 2014	Mount Lemmon	Mount Lemmon Survey	BRA	1.1 km	MPC · JPL
722450	2005 TN_{210}	—	June 10, 2010	WISE	WISE	·	1.5 km	MPC · JPL
722451	2005 TG_{213}	—	May 30, 2010	WISE	WISE	·	2.5 km	MPC · JPL
722452	2005 TC_{214}	—	October 11, 2005	Kitt Peak	Spacewatch	·	1.3 km	MPC · JPL
722453	2005 TH_{214}	—	October 4, 2005	Mount Lemmon	Mount Lemmon Survey	KOR	980 m	MPC · JPL
722454	2005 TY_{215}	—	October 1, 2005	Catalina	CSS	·	1.2 km	MPC · JPL
722455	2005 TX_{218}	—	October 12, 2005	Kitt Peak	Spacewatch	·	1.1 km	MPC · JPL
722456	2005 TF_{221}	—	October 5, 2005	Kitt Peak	Spacewatch	EOS	1.3 km	MPC · JPL
722457	2005 UF_{15}	—	October 22, 2005	Kitt Peak	Spacewatch	THM	2.6 km	MPC · JPL
722458	2005 UZ_{15}	—	October 22, 2005	Kitt Peak	Spacewatch	·	1.9 km	MPC · JPL
722459	2005 UN_{26}	—	October 23, 2005	Kitt Peak	Spacewatch	·	1.3 km	MPC · JPL
722460	2005 UQ_{26}	—	October 23, 2005	Kitt Peak	Spacewatch	URS	3.0 km	MPC · JPL
722461	2005 UE_{28}	—	October 23, 2005	Kitt Peak	Spacewatch	·	1.9 km	MPC · JPL
722462	2005 UF_{28}	—	October 23, 2005	Kitt Peak	Spacewatch	·	950 m	MPC · JPL
722463	2005 UR_{28}	—	October 1, 2005	Mount Lemmon	Mount Lemmon Survey	·	920 m	MPC · JPL
722464	2005 UR_{30}	—	September 29, 2005	Mount Lemmon	Mount Lemmon Survey	KOR	1.1 km	MPC · JPL
722465	2005 UL_{33}	—	October 25, 2005	Kitt Peak	Spacewatch	·	1.8 km	MPC · JPL
722466	2005 UE_{37}	—	October 25, 2005	Kitt Peak	Spacewatch	·	1.4 km	MPC · JPL
722467	2005 UK_{62}	—	October 25, 2005	Mount Lemmon	Mount Lemmon Survey	KOR	1.1 km	MPC · JPL
722468	2005 UU_{82}	—	October 22, 2005	Kitt Peak	Spacewatch	·	1.4 km	MPC · JPL
722469	2005 UG_{84}	—	October 1, 2005	Mount Lemmon	Mount Lemmon Survey	·	1.9 km	MPC · JPL
722470	2005 US_{87}	—	September 22, 2001	Kitt Peak	Spacewatch	·	840 m	MPC · JPL
722471	2005 UY_{88}	—	October 1, 2005	Mount Lemmon	Mount Lemmon Survey	·	1.4 km	MPC · JPL
722472	2005 UZ_{92}	—	October 22, 2005	Kitt Peak	Spacewatch	·	810 m	MPC · JPL
722473	2005 UO_{98}	—	October 22, 2005	Kitt Peak	Spacewatch	KOR	1.0 km	MPC · JPL
722474	2005 UP_{99}	—	October 22, 2005	Kitt Peak	Spacewatch	PHO	1 km	MPC · JPL
722475	2005 UL_{106}	—	October 22, 2005	Kitt Peak	Spacewatch	·	950 m	MPC · JPL
722476	2005 UU_{117}	—	October 24, 2005	Kitt Peak	Spacewatch	HOF	2.0 km	MPC · JPL
722477	2005 UD_{118}	—	October 24, 2005	Kitt Peak	Spacewatch	·	1.6 km	MPC · JPL
722478	2005 UJ_{120}	—	September 30, 2005	Mount Lemmon	Mount Lemmon Survey	·	540 m	MPC · JPL
722479	2005 UP_{123}	—	October 1, 2005	Mount Lemmon	Mount Lemmon Survey	·	2.7 km	MPC · JPL
722480	2005 UA_{124}	—	October 1, 2005	Mount Lemmon	Mount Lemmon Survey	MRX	1.0 km	MPC · JPL
722481	2005 UO_{127}	—	October 24, 2005	Kitt Peak	Spacewatch	KOR	900 m	MPC · JPL
722482	2005 UL_{133}	—	September 29, 2005	Kitt Peak	Spacewatch	·	1.7 km	MPC · JPL
722483	2005 UR_{134}	—	September 8, 1994	Kitt Peak	Spacewatch	·	930 m	MPC · JPL
722484	2005 UU_{139}	—	October 25, 2005	Mount Lemmon	Mount Lemmon Survey	EUP	3.0 km	MPC · JPL
722485	2005 UU_{144}	—	January 11, 2003	Kitt Peak	Spacewatch	·	540 m	MPC · JPL
722486	2005 UV_{146}	—	October 26, 2005	Kitt Peak	Spacewatch	·	3.8 km	MPC · JPL
722487	2005 UZ_{163}	—	October 24, 2005	Kitt Peak	Spacewatch	·	1.5 km	MPC · JPL
722488	2005 UJ_{164}	—	October 24, 2005	Kitt Peak	Spacewatch	·	2.3 km	MPC · JPL
722489	2005 UT_{165}	—	October 7, 2005	Mount Lemmon	Mount Lemmon Survey	·	1.3 km	MPC · JPL
722490	2005 UG_{167}	—	October 24, 2005	Kitt Peak	Spacewatch	KOR	1.2 km	MPC · JPL
722491	2005 UJ_{172}	—	October 24, 2005	Kitt Peak	Spacewatch	·	550 m	MPC · JPL
722492	2005 US_{172}	—	October 24, 2005	Kitt Peak	Spacewatch	·	990 m	MPC · JPL
722493	2005 UM_{176}	—	October 24, 2005	Kitt Peak	Spacewatch	·	2.6 km	MPC · JPL
722494	2005 UE_{183}	—	October 25, 2005	Kitt Peak	Spacewatch	EUN	950 m	MPC · JPL
722495	2005 UH_{189}	—	October 27, 2005	Mount Lemmon	Mount Lemmon Survey	·	1.5 km	MPC · JPL
722496	2005 UF_{193}	—	September 30, 2005	Mount Lemmon	Mount Lemmon Survey	·	510 m	MPC · JPL
722497	2005 UF_{206}	—	September 29, 2005	Kitt Peak	Spacewatch	·	1.5 km	MPC · JPL
722498	2005 UE_{208}	—	September 29, 2005	Kitt Peak	Spacewatch	EUP	3.8 km	MPC · JPL
722499	2005 UB_{233}	—	October 25, 2005	Kitt Peak	Spacewatch	·	1.5 km	MPC · JPL
722500	2005 UK_{234}	—	October 25, 2005	Kitt Peak	Spacewatch	·	1.5 km	MPC · JPL

== 722501–722600 ==
back to top

Designation			Discovery			Properties		Ref
Permanent	Provisional	Named after	Date	Site	Discoverer(s)	Category	Diam.	Ref
722501	2005 UF_{257}	—	October 25, 2005	Kitt Peak	Spacewatch	·	1.4 km	MPC · JPL
722502	2005 UK_{260}	—	October 25, 2005	Kitt Peak	Spacewatch	·	2.2 km	MPC · JPL
722503	2005 UX_{261}	—	October 26, 2005	Kitt Peak	Spacewatch	·	820 m	MPC · JPL
722504	2005 UQ_{264}	—	October 13, 2005	Kitt Peak	Spacewatch	PHO	630 m	MPC · JPL
722505	2005 US_{264}	—	September 29, 2005	Mount Lemmon	Mount Lemmon Survey	·	1.5 km	MPC · JPL
722506	2005 UG_{272}	—	October 28, 2005	Kitt Peak	Spacewatch	KOR	980 m	MPC · JPL
722507	2005 UW_{282}	—	October 26, 2005	Kitt Peak	Spacewatch	·	1.1 km	MPC · JPL
722508	2005 UE_{285}	—	October 26, 2005	Kitt Peak	Spacewatch	·	1.7 km	MPC · JPL
722509	2005 UM_{289}	—	October 26, 2005	Kitt Peak	Spacewatch	·	2.7 km	MPC · JPL
722510	2005 UP_{291}	—	October 26, 2005	Kitt Peak	Spacewatch	EOS	1.6 km	MPC · JPL
722511	2005 UH_{293}	—	October 26, 2005	Kitt Peak	Spacewatch	·	1.4 km	MPC · JPL
722512	2005 UB_{296}	—	October 26, 2005	Kitt Peak	Spacewatch	·	1.8 km	MPC · JPL
722513	2005 UD_{301}	—	October 26, 2005	Kitt Peak	Spacewatch	·	1.3 km	MPC · JPL
722514	2005 UL_{303}	—	October 26, 2005	Kitt Peak	Spacewatch	·	2.5 km	MPC · JPL
722515	2005 UF_{304}	—	October 26, 2005	Kitt Peak	Spacewatch	·	1.2 km	MPC · JPL
722516	2005 UW_{320}	—	October 27, 2005	Kitt Peak	Spacewatch	·	780 m	MPC · JPL
722517	2005 UH_{327}	—	October 29, 2005	Kitt Peak	Spacewatch	·	3.1 km	MPC · JPL
722518	2005 UD_{330}	—	October 28, 2005	Kitt Peak	Spacewatch	HOF	2.3 km	MPC · JPL
722519	2005 UK_{335}	—	October 28, 2005	Mount Lemmon	Mount Lemmon Survey	·	590 m	MPC · JPL
722520	2005 UG_{336}	—	October 30, 2005	Mount Lemmon	Mount Lemmon Survey	·	3.2 km	MPC · JPL
722521	2005 UH_{340}	—	October 31, 2005	Kitt Peak	Spacewatch	·	2.4 km	MPC · JPL
722522	2005 UT_{343}	—	October 29, 2005	Kitt Peak	Spacewatch	·	570 m	MPC · JPL
722523	2005 UJ_{346}	—	October 30, 2005	Kitt Peak	Spacewatch	·	1.6 km	MPC · JPL
722524	2005 UN_{347}	—	October 31, 2005	Kitt Peak	Spacewatch	·	1.1 km	MPC · JPL
722525	2005 UD_{356}	—	October 30, 2005	Kitt Peak	Spacewatch	KOR	1.2 km	MPC · JPL
722526	2005 UE_{357}	—	October 31, 2005	Mount Lemmon	Mount Lemmon Survey	·	1.7 km	MPC · JPL
722527	2005 UA_{366}	—	October 27, 2005	Kitt Peak	Spacewatch	·	1.8 km	MPC · JPL
722528	2005 UU_{367}	—	September 29, 2005	Mount Lemmon	Mount Lemmon Survey	·	1.2 km	MPC · JPL
722529	2005 UY_{369}	—	October 27, 2005	Kitt Peak	Spacewatch	·	1.5 km	MPC · JPL
722530	2005 UU_{377}	—	October 1, 2005	Mount Lemmon	Mount Lemmon Survey	·	490 m	MPC · JPL
722531	2005 UM_{380}	—	October 29, 2005	Mount Lemmon	Mount Lemmon Survey	·	880 m	MPC · JPL
722532	2005 UD_{384}	—	October 27, 2005	Kitt Peak	Spacewatch	KOR	1.2 km	MPC · JPL
722533	2005 UE_{403}	—	October 28, 2005	Kitt Peak	Spacewatch	·	2.2 km	MPC · JPL
722534	2005 UK_{404}	—	October 29, 2005	Mount Lemmon	Mount Lemmon Survey	·	880 m	MPC · JPL
722535	2005 UK_{407}	—	October 30, 2005	Mount Lemmon	Mount Lemmon Survey	VER	3.0 km	MPC · JPL
722536	2005 UL_{410}	—	November 17, 1998	La Palma	A. Fitzsimmons	·	1.2 km	MPC · JPL
722537	2005 UA_{411}	—	October 31, 2005	Mount Lemmon	Mount Lemmon Survey	·	700 m	MPC · JPL
722538	2005 US_{412}	—	October 31, 2005	Mount Lemmon	Mount Lemmon Survey	MAS	610 m	MPC · JPL
722539	2005 UG_{414}	—	October 25, 2005	Kitt Peak	Spacewatch	KOR	1.1 km	MPC · JPL
722540	2005 UW_{414}	—	October 25, 2005	Kitt Peak	Spacewatch	·	2.4 km	MPC · JPL
722541	2005 UR_{416}	—	October 25, 2005	Kitt Peak	Spacewatch	·	980 m	MPC · JPL
722542	2005 UH_{418}	—	October 25, 2005	Kitt Peak	Spacewatch	·	2.0 km	MPC · JPL
722543	2005 UE_{423}	—	October 28, 2005	Kitt Peak	Spacewatch	WIT	820 m	MPC · JPL
722544	2005 UN_{435}	—	October 29, 2005	Mount Lemmon	Mount Lemmon Survey	·	1.4 km	MPC · JPL
722545	2005 UZ_{442}	—	January 29, 2003	Apache Point	SDSS Collaboration	·	1.3 km	MPC · JPL
722546	2005 UC_{459}	—	October 31, 2005	Mount Lemmon	Mount Lemmon Survey	3:2	4.9 km	MPC · JPL
722547	2005 UN_{461}	—	September 23, 2005	Kitt Peak	Spacewatch	THM	2.1 km	MPC · JPL
722548	2005 UU_{468}	—	October 30, 2005	Kitt Peak	Spacewatch	·	3.0 km	MPC · JPL
722549	2005 UD_{520}	—	October 30, 2005	Apache Point	SDSS Collaboration	·	1.1 km	MPC · JPL
722550	2005 UO_{521}	—	October 30, 2005	Apache Point	SDSS Collaboration	·	1.3 km	MPC · JPL
722551	2005 UV_{527}	—	October 24, 2005	Kitt Peak	Spacewatch	·	2.5 km	MPC · JPL
722552	2005 UQ_{532}	—	September 29, 2005	Mount Lemmon	Mount Lemmon Survey	·	3.5 km	MPC · JPL
722553	2005 UY_{532}	—	October 29, 2005	Kitt Peak	Spacewatch	·	980 m	MPC · JPL
722554	2005 UP_{533}	—	October 30, 2005	Mount Lemmon	Mount Lemmon Survey	·	1.8 km	MPC · JPL
722555	2005 UW_{534}	—	October 28, 2005	Mount Lemmon	Mount Lemmon Survey	THB	3.0 km	MPC · JPL
722556	2005 UJ_{535}	—	August 29, 2009	Kitt Peak	Spacewatch	·	1.3 km	MPC · JPL
722557	2005 UL_{535}	—	April 1, 2008	Mount Lemmon	Mount Lemmon Survey	·	1.9 km	MPC · JPL
722558	2005 UN_{535}	—	September 18, 2009	Mount Lemmon	Mount Lemmon Survey	·	900 m	MPC · JPL
722559	2005 UG_{536}	—	October 24, 2005	Kitt Peak	Spacewatch	KOR	1.1 km	MPC · JPL
722560	2005 UO_{539}	—	April 21, 2010	WISE	WISE	·	3.6 km	MPC · JPL
722561	2005 UX_{539}	—	July 25, 2014	Haleakala	Pan-STARRS 1	·	1.8 km	MPC · JPL
722562	2005 UG_{540}	—	October 24, 2005	Kitt Peak	Spacewatch	·	1.6 km	MPC · JPL
722563	2005 UD_{541}	—	June 27, 2014	Haleakala	Pan-STARRS 1	·	1.5 km	MPC · JPL
722564	2005 UV_{544}	—	June 18, 2010	WISE	WISE	·	1.4 km	MPC · JPL
722565	2005 UH_{546}	—	July 28, 2014	Haleakala	Pan-STARRS 1	·	1.4 km	MPC · JPL
722566	2005 UP_{547}	—	October 27, 2005	Kitt Peak	Spacewatch	KOR	1.1 km	MPC · JPL
722567	2005 UB_{548}	—	October 25, 2005	Kitt Peak	Spacewatch	·	1.7 km	MPC · JPL
722568	2005 UE_{551}	—	October 25, 2005	Mount Lemmon	Mount Lemmon Survey	ULA	3.3 km	MPC · JPL
722569	2005 UA_{557}	—	October 26, 2005	Kitt Peak	Spacewatch	·	1.4 km	MPC · JPL
722570	2005 VL_{10}	—	October 27, 2005	Kitt Peak	Spacewatch	EOS	2.3 km	MPC · JPL
722571	2005 VJ_{13}	—	November 3, 2005	Mount Lemmon	Mount Lemmon Survey	·	1.2 km	MPC · JPL
722572	2005 VZ_{18}	—	November 1, 2005	Kitt Peak	Spacewatch	·	1.5 km	MPC · JPL
722573	2005 VN_{23}	—	November 1, 2005	Kitt Peak	Spacewatch	PAD	1.2 km	MPC · JPL
722574	2005 VB_{30}	—	November 4, 2005	Kitt Peak	Spacewatch	·	2.6 km	MPC · JPL
722575	2005 VK_{37}	—	November 3, 2005	Mount Lemmon	Mount Lemmon Survey	·	3.4 km	MPC · JPL
722576	2005 VG_{46}	—	November 4, 2005	Mount Lemmon	Mount Lemmon Survey	·	2.2 km	MPC · JPL
722577	2005 VJ_{46}	—	November 4, 2005	Mount Lemmon	Mount Lemmon Survey	V	520 m	MPC · JPL
722578	2005 VB_{47}	—	September 30, 2005	Mount Lemmon	Mount Lemmon Survey	KOR	1.2 km	MPC · JPL
722579	2005 VR_{54}	—	November 4, 2005	Kitt Peak	Spacewatch	·	1.1 km	MPC · JPL
722580	2005 VT_{57}	—	November 4, 2005	Mount Lemmon	Mount Lemmon Survey	·	800 m	MPC · JPL
722581	2005 VQ_{63}	—	November 3, 2005	Kitt Peak	Spacewatch	·	1.5 km	MPC · JPL
722582	2005 VD_{67}	—	October 24, 2005	Kitt Peak	Spacewatch	·	2.6 km	MPC · JPL
722583	2005 VD_{91}	—	November 6, 2005	Kitt Peak	Spacewatch	·	2.1 km	MPC · JPL
722584	2005 VZ_{95}	—	November 6, 2005	Kitt Peak	Spacewatch	·	1.4 km	MPC · JPL
722585	2005 VG_{104}	—	November 3, 2005	Mount Lemmon	Mount Lemmon Survey	·	1.1 km	MPC · JPL
722586	2005 VO_{108}	—	November 6, 2005	Kitt Peak	Spacewatch	·	1.6 km	MPC · JPL
722587	2005 VF_{118}	—	November 3, 2005	Mount Lemmon	Mount Lemmon Survey	·	1.6 km	MPC · JPL
722588	2005 VA_{133}	—	October 31, 2005	Apache Point	SDSS Collaboration	·	2.6 km	MPC · JPL
722589	2005 VW_{134}	—	November 1, 2005	Mauna Kea	P. A. Wiegert, D. D. Balam	·	3.7 km	MPC · JPL
722590	2005 VG_{138}	—	November 1, 2005	Mount Lemmon	Mount Lemmon Survey	NYS	950 m	MPC · JPL
722591	2005 VL_{139}	—	November 10, 2005	Mount Lemmon	Mount Lemmon Survey	·	1.2 km	MPC · JPL
722592	2005 VN_{139}	—	March 15, 2010	WISE	WISE	EUP	4.0 km	MPC · JPL
722593	2005 VC_{140}	—	October 23, 2009	Mount Lemmon	Mount Lemmon Survey	MAR	700 m	MPC · JPL
722594	2005 VD_{141}	—	December 27, 2013	Kitt Peak	Spacewatch	·	980 m	MPC · JPL
722595	2005 VP_{143}	—	July 27, 2010	WISE	WISE	·	1.8 km	MPC · JPL
722596	2005 VZ_{143}	—	November 12, 2010	Mount Lemmon	Mount Lemmon Survey	BRA	1.2 km	MPC · JPL
722597	2005 VV_{144}	—	January 27, 2007	Mount Lemmon	Mount Lemmon Survey	·	990 m	MPC · JPL
722598	2005 VC_{149}	—	December 4, 2015	Mount Lemmon	Mount Lemmon Survey	KOR	1.1 km	MPC · JPL
722599	2005 VN_{149}	—	May 28, 2010	WISE	WISE	·	2.6 km	MPC · JPL
722600	2005 VZ_{150}	—	November 5, 2005	Kitt Peak	Spacewatch	·	1.1 km	MPC · JPL

== 722601–722700 ==
back to top

Designation			Discovery			Properties		Ref
Permanent	Provisional	Named after	Date	Site	Discoverer(s)	Category	Diam.	Ref
722601	2005 VB_{152}	—	November 1, 2005	Mount Lemmon	Mount Lemmon Survey	NYS	920 m	MPC · JPL
722602	2005 VW_{156}	—	November 1, 2005	Kitt Peak	Spacewatch	·	1.4 km	MPC · JPL
722603	2005 WT	—	November 20, 2005	La Silla	Vuissoz, C., Behrend, R.	·	4.6 km	MPC · JPL
722604	2005 WG_{17}	—	November 10, 2005	Mount Lemmon	Mount Lemmon Survey	·	1.9 km	MPC · JPL
722605	2005 WT_{37}	—	November 22, 2005	Kitt Peak	Spacewatch	·	2.0 km	MPC · JPL
722606	2005 WJ_{50}	—	November 25, 2005	Mount Lemmon	Mount Lemmon Survey	·	2.5 km	MPC · JPL
722607	2005 WV_{50}	—	November 25, 2005	Mount Lemmon	Mount Lemmon Survey	MAS	540 m	MPC · JPL
722608	2005 WS_{61}	—	November 25, 2005	Catalina	CSS	·	1.8 km	MPC · JPL
722609	2005 WF_{62}	—	November 5, 2005	Kitt Peak	Spacewatch	·	820 m	MPC · JPL
722610	2005 WT_{64}	—	November 6, 2005	Nogales	J.-C. Merlin	·	1.9 km	MPC · JPL
722611	2005 WG_{82}	—	October 25, 2005	Catalina	CSS	·	2.5 km	MPC · JPL
722612	2005 WR_{84}	—	October 27, 2005	Mount Lemmon	Mount Lemmon Survey	·	1.4 km	MPC · JPL
722613	2005 WG_{97}	—	November 10, 2005	Mount Lemmon	Mount Lemmon Survey	·	1.5 km	MPC · JPL
722614	2005 WO_{98}	—	November 28, 2005	Mount Lemmon	Mount Lemmon Survey	·	1.9 km	MPC · JPL
722615	2005 WX_{104}	—	November 28, 2005	Palomar	NEAT	·	2.4 km	MPC · JPL
722616	2005 WT_{107}	—	November 26, 2005	Mount Lemmon	Mount Lemmon Survey	·	2.4 km	MPC · JPL
722617	2005 WV_{109}	—	October 27, 2005	Mount Lemmon	Mount Lemmon Survey	·	3.5 km	MPC · JPL
722618	2005 WG_{129}	—	November 25, 2005	Mount Lemmon	Mount Lemmon Survey	·	960 m	MPC · JPL
722619	2005 WL_{132}	—	November 25, 2005	Mount Lemmon	Mount Lemmon Survey	ERI	1.2 km	MPC · JPL
722620	2005 WK_{164}	—	November 29, 2005	Mount Lemmon	Mount Lemmon Survey	·	3.7 km	MPC · JPL
722621	2005 WD_{165}	—	November 29, 2005	Mount Lemmon	Mount Lemmon Survey	VER	3.2 km	MPC · JPL
722622	2005 WV_{167}	—	November 30, 2005	Kitt Peak	Spacewatch	·	2.1 km	MPC · JPL
722623	2005 WX_{179}	—	November 21, 2005	Catalina	CSS	THB	2.6 km	MPC · JPL
722624	2005 WQ_{187}	—	November 19, 2005	Palomar	NEAT	·	4.6 km	MPC · JPL
722625	2005 WO_{191}	—	October 24, 2005	Palomar	NEAT	·	1.1 km	MPC · JPL
722626	2005 WS_{203}	—	November 20, 2005	Palomar	NEAT	·	3.5 km	MPC · JPL
722627	2005 WW_{213}	—	November 30, 2005	Kitt Peak	Spacewatch	·	510 m	MPC · JPL
722628	2005 WB_{215}	—	November 25, 2009	Mount Lemmon	Mount Lemmon Survey	EUN	1 km	MPC · JPL
722629	2005 WY_{216}	—	November 21, 2005	Kitt Peak	Spacewatch	NYS	1.3 km	MPC · JPL
722630	2005 XB_{6}	—	December 1, 2005	Mount Lemmon	Mount Lemmon Survey	·	860 m	MPC · JPL
722631	2005 XN_{9}	—	November 6, 2005	Mount Lemmon	Mount Lemmon Survey	·	2.4 km	MPC · JPL
722632	2005 XN_{10}	—	December 1, 2005	Kitt Peak	Spacewatch	·	2.3 km	MPC · JPL
722633	2005 XO_{13}	—	December 1, 2005	Kitt Peak	Spacewatch	·	2.6 km	MPC · JPL
722634	2005 XJ_{19}	—	December 2, 2005	Kitt Peak	Spacewatch	KOR	1.0 km	MPC · JPL
722635	2005 XA_{30}	—	December 1, 2005	Kitt Peak	Spacewatch	·	1.2 km	MPC · JPL
722636	2005 XP_{36}	—	December 4, 2005	Kitt Peak	Spacewatch	·	2.1 km	MPC · JPL
722637	2005 XS_{40}	—	December 5, 2005	Kitt Peak	Spacewatch	·	1.7 km	MPC · JPL
722638	2005 XW_{41}	—	December 7, 2005	Kitt Peak	Spacewatch	·	920 m	MPC · JPL
722639	2005 XT_{46}	—	December 2, 2005	Kitt Peak	Spacewatch	·	3.5 km	MPC · JPL
722640	2005 XU_{48}	—	November 25, 2005	Kitt Peak	Spacewatch	(895)	3.6 km	MPC · JPL
722641	2005 XX_{55}	—	December 5, 2005	Mount Lemmon	Mount Lemmon Survey	·	1.9 km	MPC · JPL
722642	2005 XE_{60}	—	December 3, 2005	Kitt Peak	Spacewatch	·	1.7 km	MPC · JPL
722643	2005 XL_{63}	—	December 5, 2005	Mount Lemmon	Mount Lemmon Survey	·	1.1 km	MPC · JPL
722644	2005 XN_{70}	—	November 25, 2005	Kitt Peak	Spacewatch	·	990 m	MPC · JPL
722645	2005 XH_{84}	—	December 8, 2005	Socorro	LINEAR	THB	3.7 km	MPC · JPL
722646	2005 XF_{105}	—	September 11, 2004	Kitt Peak	Spacewatch	·	720 m	MPC · JPL
722647	2005 XL_{106}	—	December 1, 2005	Kitt Peak	Wasserman, L. H., Millis, R. L.	L5	7.4 km	MPC · JPL
722648	2005 XZ_{106}	—	December 1, 2005	Kitt Peak	Wasserman, L. H., Millis, R. L.	L5	7.8 km	MPC · JPL
722649	2005 XL_{112}	—	December 3, 2005	Mauna Kea	A. Boattini	·	3.5 km	MPC · JPL
722650	2005 XC_{120}	—	December 4, 2005	Mount Lemmon	Mount Lemmon Survey	·	1.0 km	MPC · JPL
722651	2005 XA_{122}	—	June 22, 2010	WISE	WISE	·	2.8 km	MPC · JPL
722652	2005 XT_{123}	—	November 26, 2005	Kitt Peak	Spacewatch	·	1.1 km	MPC · JPL
722653	2005 XU_{123}	—	December 7, 2005	Kitt Peak	Spacewatch	·	2.6 km	MPC · JPL
722654	2005 XE_{124}	—	December 5, 2005	Kitt Peak	Spacewatch	ELF	2.8 km	MPC · JPL
722655	2005 XP_{125}	—	October 29, 2005	Catalina	CSS	·	3.3 km	MPC · JPL
722656	2005 XA_{126}	—	July 18, 2010	WISE	WISE	·	2.9 km	MPC · JPL
722657	2005 XL_{126}	—	August 18, 2009	Kitt Peak	Spacewatch	·	1.1 km	MPC · JPL
722658	2005 XN_{126}	—	May 20, 2015	Cerro Tololo-DECam	DECam	·	3.1 km	MPC · JPL
722659	2005 XQ_{126}	—	July 25, 2010	WISE	WISE	·	2.6 km	MPC · JPL
722660	2005 XV_{126}	—	February 16, 2015	Haleakala	Pan-STARRS 1	·	1.3 km	MPC · JPL
722661	2005 XM_{127}	—	July 20, 2010	WISE	WISE	VER	2.4 km	MPC · JPL
722662	2005 XF_{130}	—	January 6, 2006	Mount Lemmon	Mount Lemmon Survey	THB	2.8 km	MPC · JPL
722663	2005 XP_{130}	—	May 27, 2014	Mount Lemmon	Mount Lemmon Survey	·	880 m	MPC · JPL
722664	2005 YV_{2}	—	December 21, 2005	Catalina	CSS	·	1.9 km	MPC · JPL
722665	2005 YA_{5}	—	November 25, 2005	Kitt Peak	Spacewatch	·	1.6 km	MPC · JPL
722666	2005 YA_{17}	—	December 23, 2005	Kitt Peak	Spacewatch	EUP	3.4 km	MPC · JPL
722667	2005 YN_{17}	—	December 23, 2005	Kitt Peak	Spacewatch	·	930 m	MPC · JPL
722668	2005 YC_{30}	—	October 7, 2005	Mount Lemmon	Mount Lemmon Survey	·	2.0 km	MPC · JPL
722669	2005 YH_{30}	—	December 8, 2005	Mount Lemmon	Mount Lemmon Survey	THM	2.0 km	MPC · JPL
722670	2005 YW_{41}	—	December 2, 2005	Mount Lemmon	Mount Lemmon Survey	LIX	3.3 km	MPC · JPL
722671	2005 YS_{62}	—	December 24, 2005	Kitt Peak	Spacewatch	·	1.6 km	MPC · JPL
722672	2005 YH_{78}	—	December 24, 2005	Kitt Peak	Spacewatch	·	2.1 km	MPC · JPL
722673	2005 YW_{82}	—	December 24, 2005	Kitt Peak	Spacewatch	·	1.0 km	MPC · JPL
722674	2005 YD_{101}	—	December 25, 2005	Kitt Peak	Spacewatch	ULA	4.5 km	MPC · JPL
722675	2005 YK_{102}	—	December 25, 2005	Kitt Peak	Spacewatch	·	2.4 km	MPC · JPL
722676	2005 YN_{104}	—	December 25, 2005	Kitt Peak	Spacewatch	·	910 m	MPC · JPL
722677	2005 YK_{111}	—	December 25, 2005	Kitt Peak	Spacewatch	·	540 m	MPC · JPL
722678	2005 YR_{115}	—	December 25, 2005	Kitt Peak	Spacewatch	·	2.5 km	MPC · JPL
722679	2005 YM_{117}	—	December 25, 2005	Kitt Peak	Spacewatch	·	1.4 km	MPC · JPL
722680	2005 YE_{120}	—	December 27, 2005	Mount Lemmon	Mount Lemmon Survey	·	3.1 km	MPC · JPL
722681	2005 YF_{125}	—	December 26, 2005	Kitt Peak	Spacewatch	·	1.7 km	MPC · JPL
722682	2005 YF_{128}	—	December 28, 2005	Mount Lemmon	Mount Lemmon Survey	H	580 m	MPC · JPL
722683	2005 YE_{134}	—	December 26, 2005	Kitt Peak	Spacewatch	·	3.5 km	MPC · JPL
722684	2005 YW_{145}	—	December 29, 2005	Kitt Peak	Spacewatch	·	960 m	MPC · JPL
722685	2005 YV_{148}	—	December 25, 2005	Kitt Peak	Spacewatch	(5)	830 m	MPC · JPL
722686	2005 YJ_{162}	—	December 27, 2005	Mount Lemmon	Mount Lemmon Survey	·	890 m	MPC · JPL
722687	2005 YA_{175}	—	December 30, 2005	Socorro	LINEAR	EUP	3.9 km	MPC · JPL
722688	2005 YU_{186}	—	December 28, 2005	Kitt Peak	Spacewatch	·	590 m	MPC · JPL
722689	2005 YW_{186}	—	December 2, 2005	Mount Lemmon	Mount Lemmon Survey	THM	1.7 km	MPC · JPL
722690	2005 YM_{208}	—	December 21, 2005	Catalina	CSS	·	1.5 km	MPC · JPL
722691	2005 YM_{213}	—	December 19, 2001	Palomar	NEAT	·	1.9 km	MPC · JPL
722692	2005 YN_{215}	—	November 10, 2005	Kitt Peak	Spacewatch	·	960 m	MPC · JPL
722693	2005 YG_{219}	—	December 8, 2005	Kitt Peak	Spacewatch	·	2.5 km	MPC · JPL
722694	2005 YG_{222}	—	December 21, 2005	Kitt Peak	Spacewatch	·	2.5 km	MPC · JPL
722695	2005 YF_{234}	—	July 14, 2004	Siding Spring	SSS	·	1.5 km	MPC · JPL
722696	2005 YG_{236}	—	December 28, 2005	Kitt Peak	Spacewatch	·	1.5 km	MPC · JPL
722697	2005 YD_{239}	—	December 29, 2005	Kitt Peak	Spacewatch	·	1.2 km	MPC · JPL
722698	2005 YA_{240}	—	December 29, 2005	Mount Lemmon	Mount Lemmon Survey	·	2.0 km	MPC · JPL
722699	2005 YR_{240}	—	December 29, 2005	Kitt Peak	Spacewatch	V	510 m	MPC · JPL
722700	2005 YQ_{241}	—	November 10, 2005	Mount Lemmon	Mount Lemmon Survey	·	1.5 km	MPC · JPL

== 722701–722800 ==
back to top

Designation			Discovery			Properties		Ref
Permanent	Provisional	Named after	Date	Site	Discoverer(s)	Category	Diam.	Ref
722701	2005 YY_{246}	—	March 12, 2002	Kitt Peak	Spacewatch	·	1.6 km	MPC · JPL
722702	2005 YB_{247}	—	June 3, 1997	Kitt Peak	Spacewatch	·	2.6 km	MPC · JPL
722703	2005 YC_{249}	—	December 28, 2005	Kitt Peak	Spacewatch	PHO	780 m	MPC · JPL
722704	2005 YV_{249}	—	December 28, 2005	Mount Lemmon	Mount Lemmon Survey	HOF	2.7 km	MPC · JPL
722705	2005 YS_{254}	—	December 30, 2005	Kitt Peak	Spacewatch	·	1.6 km	MPC · JPL
722706	2005 YL_{256}	—	December 30, 2005	Kitt Peak	Spacewatch	·	4.2 km	MPC · JPL
722707	2005 YK_{261}	—	December 25, 2005	Kitt Peak	Spacewatch	NAE	2.1 km	MPC · JPL
722708	2005 YL_{264}	—	December 25, 2005	Kitt Peak	Spacewatch	·	530 m	MPC · JPL
722709	2005 YL_{267}	—	December 25, 2005	Kitt Peak	Spacewatch	·	1.5 km	MPC · JPL
722710	2005 YX_{268}	—	December 25, 2005	Mount Lemmon	Mount Lemmon Survey	·	1.9 km	MPC · JPL
722711	2005 YO_{271}	—	December 28, 2005	Kitt Peak	Spacewatch	·	1.9 km	MPC · JPL
722712	2005 YD_{273}	—	November 30, 2005	Mount Lemmon	Mount Lemmon Survey	·	2.4 km	MPC · JPL
722713	2005 YZ_{279}	—	April 30, 2003	Kitt Peak	Spacewatch	·	1.1 km	MPC · JPL
722714	2005 YX_{283}	—	November 6, 2005	Mount Lemmon	Mount Lemmon Survey	DOR	2.0 km	MPC · JPL
722715	2005 YU_{288}	—	November 25, 2005	Kitt Peak	Spacewatch	·	3.2 km	MPC · JPL
722716	2005 YZ_{294}	—	August 5, 2010	WISE	WISE	·	2.8 km	MPC · JPL
722717	2005 YA_{295}	—	November 9, 2013	Haleakala	Pan-STARRS 1	·	960 m	MPC · JPL
722718	2005 YB_{295}	—	April 12, 2010	WISE	WISE	PHO	1.0 km	MPC · JPL
722719	2005 YG_{295}	—	May 16, 2012	Mount Lemmon	Mount Lemmon Survey	NEM	1.9 km	MPC · JPL
722720	2005 YJ_{296}	—	July 1, 2010	WISE	WISE	PHO	690 m	MPC · JPL
722721	2005 YR_{299}	—	September 5, 2010	Mount Lemmon	Mount Lemmon Survey	(260)	2.7 km	MPC · JPL
722722	2006 AO_{8}	—	January 2, 2006	Mount Lemmon	Mount Lemmon Survey	·	3.6 km	MPC · JPL
722723	2006 AU_{9}	—	January 4, 2006	Mount Lemmon	Mount Lemmon Survey	·	3.0 km	MPC · JPL
722724	2006 AG_{10}	—	January 4, 2006	Kitt Peak	Spacewatch	·	1.4 km	MPC · JPL
722725	2006 AH_{13}	—	December 21, 2005	Kitt Peak	Spacewatch	·	3.0 km	MPC · JPL
722726	2006 AO_{18}	—	December 6, 2005	Mount Lemmon	Mount Lemmon Survey	·	3.7 km	MPC · JPL
722727	2006 AG_{23}	—	January 4, 2006	Kitt Peak	Spacewatch	·	870 m	MPC · JPL
722728	2006 AA_{26}	—	December 28, 2005	Kitt Peak	Spacewatch	EOS	1.4 km	MPC · JPL
722729	2006 AO_{40}	—	January 7, 2006	Mount Lemmon	Mount Lemmon Survey	AST	2.0 km	MPC · JPL
722730	2006 AV_{42}	—	January 6, 2006	Kitt Peak	Spacewatch	HOF	2.8 km	MPC · JPL
722731	2006 AW_{42}	—	September 24, 2004	Kitt Peak	Spacewatch	·	1.1 km	MPC · JPL
722732	2006 AJ_{43}	—	January 6, 2006	Kitt Peak	Spacewatch	·	1.4 km	MPC · JPL
722733	2006 AM_{64}	—	February 7, 2002	Kitt Peak	Spacewatch	·	1.0 km	MPC · JPL
722734	2006 AH_{74}	—	January 5, 2006	Catalina	CSS	·	2.1 km	MPC · JPL
722735	2006 AK_{93}	—	January 7, 2006	Kitt Peak	Spacewatch	·	1.1 km	MPC · JPL
722736	2006 AU_{101}	—	January 14, 2011	Mount Lemmon	Mount Lemmon Survey	KOR	1.2 km	MPC · JPL
722737	2006 AY_{105}	—	January 10, 2006	Mount Lemmon	Mount Lemmon Survey	L5	10 km	MPC · JPL
722738	2006 AW_{108}	—	September 22, 2011	Mount Lemmon	Mount Lemmon Survey	·	580 m	MPC · JPL
722739	2006 AG_{111}	—	October 10, 2008	Mount Lemmon	Mount Lemmon Survey	·	540 m	MPC · JPL
722740	2006 AG_{113}	—	January 10, 2006	Kitt Peak	Spacewatch	·	860 m	MPC · JPL
722741	2006 AK_{113}	—	March 13, 2012	Mount Lemmon	Mount Lemmon Survey	·	1.7 km	MPC · JPL
722742	2006 BR_{13}	—	December 28, 2005	Kitt Peak	Spacewatch	·	1.9 km	MPC · JPL
722743	2006 BB_{21}	—	January 22, 2006	Mount Lemmon	Mount Lemmon Survey	MAS	510 m	MPC · JPL
722744	2006 BU_{33}	—	January 21, 2006	Kitt Peak	Spacewatch	·	2.7 km	MPC · JPL
722745	2006 BZ_{34}	—	December 30, 2005	Kitt Peak	Spacewatch	·	1.5 km	MPC · JPL
722746	2006 BK_{39}	—	January 24, 2006	Mount Nyukasa	Japan Aerospace Exploration Agency	·	1.6 km	MPC · JPL
722747	2006 BF_{57}	—	March 3, 2000	Apache Point	SDSS	·	700 m	MPC · JPL
722748	2006 BP_{68}	—	January 23, 2006	Kitt Peak	Spacewatch	·	1.1 km	MPC · JPL
722749	2006 BC_{69}	—	January 23, 2006	Kitt Peak	Spacewatch	·	3.1 km	MPC · JPL
722750	2006 BG_{70}	—	January 23, 2006	Kitt Peak	Spacewatch	·	1.4 km	MPC · JPL
722751	2006 BG_{87}	—	January 25, 2006	Kitt Peak	Spacewatch	·	1.0 km	MPC · JPL
722752	2006 BD_{91}	—	January 31, 1997	Kitt Peak	Spacewatch	·	1.5 km	MPC · JPL
722753	2006 BM_{101}	—	January 23, 2006	Mount Lemmon	Mount Lemmon Survey	·	1.3 km	MPC · JPL
722754	2006 BY_{104}	—	January 25, 2006	Kitt Peak	Spacewatch	·	1.3 km	MPC · JPL
722755	2006 BF_{105}	—	January 25, 2006	Kitt Peak	Spacewatch	·	630 m	MPC · JPL
722756	2006 BG_{105}	—	October 23, 2001	Palomar	NEAT	·	690 m	MPC · JPL
722757	2006 BQ_{109}	—	January 25, 2006	Kitt Peak	Spacewatch	·	3.1 km	MPC · JPL
722758	2006 BN_{110}	—	September 3, 2000	Apache Point	SDSS Collaboration	PHO	770 m	MPC · JPL
722759	2006 BV_{111}	—	August 28, 2000	Prescott	P. G. Comba	V	710 m	MPC · JPL
722760	2006 BD_{125}	—	January 26, 2006	Kitt Peak	Spacewatch	·	3.5 km	MPC · JPL
722761	2006 BQ_{125}	—	January 26, 2006	Kitt Peak	Spacewatch	·	1.1 km	MPC · JPL
722762	2006 BZ_{130}	—	December 2, 2005	Kitt Peak	Wasserman, L. H., Millis, R. L.	·	1.9 km	MPC · JPL
722763	2006 BP_{153}	—	January 25, 2006	Kitt Peak	Spacewatch	·	1.6 km	MPC · JPL
722764	2006 BT_{158}	—	December 30, 2005	Kitt Peak	Spacewatch	·	1.1 km	MPC · JPL
722765	2006 BN_{159}	—	January 26, 2006	Kitt Peak	Spacewatch	·	1.8 km	MPC · JPL
722766	2006 BT_{163}	—	January 26, 2006	Mount Lemmon	Mount Lemmon Survey	·	1.9 km	MPC · JPL
722767	2006 BW_{170}	—	January 27, 2006	Kitt Peak	Spacewatch	·	1.9 km	MPC · JPL
722768	2006 BD_{176}	—	January 27, 2006	Kitt Peak	Spacewatch	·	1.0 km	MPC · JPL
722769	2006 BW_{176}	—	January 23, 2006	Kitt Peak	Spacewatch	·	1.4 km	MPC · JPL
722770	2006 BH_{185}	—	October 7, 2005	Mauna Kea	A. Boattini	L5	7.3 km	MPC · JPL
722771	2006 BV_{187}	—	January 28, 2006	Kitt Peak	Spacewatch	·	1.0 km	MPC · JPL
722772	2006 BT_{197}	—	January 30, 2006	Kitt Peak	Spacewatch	·	1.5 km	MPC · JPL
722773	2006 BQ_{204}	—	January 31, 2006	Kitt Peak	Spacewatch	HOF	2.6 km	MPC · JPL
722774	2006 BU_{213}	—	January 23, 2006	Catalina	CSS	·	1.3 km	MPC · JPL
722775	2006 BA_{222}	—	January 23, 2006	Mount Lemmon	Mount Lemmon Survey	·	570 m	MPC · JPL
722776	2006 BY_{224}	—	January 30, 2006	Kitt Peak	Spacewatch	·	2.4 km	MPC · JPL
722777	2006 BK_{229}	—	January 31, 2006	Kitt Peak	Spacewatch	·	1.7 km	MPC · JPL
722778	2006 BS_{230}	—	January 31, 2006	Kitt Peak	Spacewatch	·	1.6 km	MPC · JPL
722779	2006 BY_{232}	—	January 31, 2006	Kitt Peak	Spacewatch	·	2.0 km	MPC · JPL
722780	2006 BX_{236}	—	January 31, 2006	Kitt Peak	Spacewatch	·	1.8 km	MPC · JPL
722781	2006 BZ_{240}	—	January 25, 2006	Kitt Peak	Spacewatch	3:2 · SHU	3.7 km	MPC · JPL
722782	2006 BF_{243}	—	January 23, 2006	Kitt Peak	Spacewatch	MAR	860 m	MPC · JPL
722783	2006 BM_{247}	—	January 31, 2006	Kitt Peak	Spacewatch	L5	9.6 km	MPC · JPL
722784	2006 BL_{248}	—	January 31, 2006	Kitt Peak	Spacewatch	KOR	1.2 km	MPC · JPL
722785	2006 BQ_{250}	—	September 29, 2003	Kitt Peak	Spacewatch	·	2.5 km	MPC · JPL
722786	2006 BK_{254}	—	January 31, 2006	Kitt Peak	Spacewatch	EOS	1.5 km	MPC · JPL
722787	2006 BY_{255}	—	January 31, 2006	Kitt Peak	Spacewatch	EOS	1.7 km	MPC · JPL
722788	2006 BO_{259}	—	January 31, 2006	Kitt Peak	Spacewatch	·	2.4 km	MPC · JPL
722789	2006 BP_{261}	—	January 31, 2006	Kitt Peak	Spacewatch	·	660 m	MPC · JPL
722790	2006 BY_{265}	—	January 31, 2006	Kitt Peak	Spacewatch	·	900 m	MPC · JPL
722791	2006 BU_{284}	—	January 30, 2006	Kitt Peak	Spacewatch	·	1.6 km	MPC · JPL
722792	2006 BQ_{287}	—	November 8, 2010	Mount Lemmon	Mount Lemmon Survey	HYG	2.2 km	MPC · JPL
722793	2006 BZ_{287}	—	January 28, 2006	Mount Lemmon	Mount Lemmon Survey	KON	1.8 km	MPC · JPL
722794	2006 BU_{288}	—	January 31, 2006	Kitt Peak	Spacewatch	NYS	860 m	MPC · JPL
722795	2006 BW_{288}	—	October 23, 2008	Kitt Peak	Spacewatch	·	830 m	MPC · JPL
722796	2006 BA_{289}	—	January 8, 2010	Mount Lemmon	Mount Lemmon Survey	EUN	1.0 km	MPC · JPL
722797	2006 BB_{289}	—	June 14, 2010	WISE	WISE	URS	2.6 km	MPC · JPL
722798	2006 BP_{290}	—	October 1, 2009	Mount Lemmon	Mount Lemmon Survey	·	2.0 km	MPC · JPL
722799	2006 BC_{291}	—	January 23, 2011	Mount Lemmon	Mount Lemmon Survey	EOS	1.4 km	MPC · JPL
722800	2006 BP_{293}	—	March 17, 2012	Mount Lemmon	Mount Lemmon Survey	·	2.0 km	MPC · JPL

== 722801–722900 ==
back to top

Designation			Discovery			Properties		Ref
Permanent	Provisional	Named after	Date	Site	Discoverer(s)	Category	Diam.	Ref
722801	2006 BR_{293}	—	July 28, 2010	WISE	WISE	·	3.4 km	MPC · JPL
722802	2006 BY_{293}	—	August 11, 2010	WISE	WISE	·	3.1 km	MPC · JPL
722803	2006 BC_{294}	—	December 30, 2016	Mount Lemmon	Mount Lemmon Survey	·	2.9 km	MPC · JPL
722804	2006 BL_{295}	—	July 31, 2014	Haleakala	Pan-STARRS 1	EOS	1.5 km	MPC · JPL
722805	2006 BO_{295}	—	June 28, 2014	Haleakala	Pan-STARRS 1	T_{j} (2.97)	3.0 km	MPC · JPL
722806	2006 BS_{295}	—	January 13, 2011	Mount Lemmon	Mount Lemmon Survey	EOS	1.5 km	MPC · JPL
722807	2006 BL_{296}	—	January 26, 2014	Haleakala	Pan-STARRS 1	·	700 m	MPC · JPL
722808	2006 BO_{296}	—	December 14, 2015	Mount Lemmon	Mount Lemmon Survey	·	1.4 km	MPC · JPL
722809	2006 CJ_{2}	—	February 1, 2006	Kitt Peak	Spacewatch	KOR	1.2 km	MPC · JPL
722810	2006 CP_{7}	—	February 12, 2002	Kitt Peak	Spacewatch	MAR	970 m	MPC · JPL
722811	2006 CS_{27}	—	January 7, 2006	Mount Lemmon	Mount Lemmon Survey	LIX	3.3 km	MPC · JPL
722812	2006 CE_{37}	—	February 2, 2006	Mount Lemmon	Mount Lemmon Survey	KOR	1.2 km	MPC · JPL
722813	2006 CN_{42}	—	February 2, 2006	Kitt Peak	Spacewatch	·	1.0 km	MPC · JPL
722814	2006 CE_{43}	—	February 2, 2006	Kitt Peak	Spacewatch	·	820 m	MPC · JPL
722815	2006 CK_{43}	—	February 2, 2006	Kitt Peak	Spacewatch	L5	7.7 km	MPC · JPL
722816	2006 CB_{46}	—	February 3, 2006	Mount Lemmon	Mount Lemmon Survey	·	500 m	MPC · JPL
722817	2006 CG_{46}	—	February 7, 2006	Mount Lemmon	Mount Lemmon Survey	·	2.2 km	MPC · JPL
722818	2006 CY_{51}	—	February 4, 2006	Kitt Peak	Spacewatch	·	1.1 km	MPC · JPL
722819	2006 CK_{52}	—	February 4, 2006	Kitt Peak	Spacewatch	·	960 m	MPC · JPL
722820	2006 CC_{61}	—	January 27, 2006	Catalina	CSS	·	1.6 km	MPC · JPL
722821	2006 CU_{64}	—	November 30, 2005	Kitt Peak	Spacewatch	·	770 m	MPC · JPL
722822	2006 CG_{72}	—	December 5, 2005	Mount Lemmon	Mount Lemmon Survey	·	1.9 km	MPC · JPL
722823	2006 CQ_{76}	—	February 3, 2006	Mauna Kea	P. A. Wiegert, R. Rasmussen	·	830 m	MPC · JPL
722824	2006 CZ_{76}	—	October 9, 2004	Kitt Peak	Spacewatch	AST	1.9 km	MPC · JPL
722825	2006 CC_{81}	—	February 6, 2006	Mount Lemmon	Mount Lemmon Survey	·	1.4 km	MPC · JPL
722826	2006 CR_{82}	—	September 26, 2009	Kitt Peak	Spacewatch	·	1.7 km	MPC · JPL
722827	2006 CU_{82}	—	April 18, 2012	Catalina	CSS	TIR	2.2 km	MPC · JPL
722828	2006 CJ_{83}	—	February 2, 2006	Kitt Peak	Spacewatch	·	1.6 km	MPC · JPL
722829	2006 CE_{84}	—	March 13, 2010	WISE	WISE	·	700 m	MPC · JPL
722830	2006 CQ_{84}	—	December 17, 2009	Mount Lemmon	Mount Lemmon Survey	·	1.2 km	MPC · JPL
722831	2006 CS_{84}	—	February 1, 2006	Mount Lemmon	Mount Lemmon Survey	EOS	1.4 km	MPC · JPL
722832	2006 CE_{85}	—	January 17, 2015	Mount Lemmon	Mount Lemmon Survey	·	1.5 km	MPC · JPL
722833	2006 CL_{85}	—	December 8, 2012	Mount Lemmon	Mount Lemmon Survey	·	1.1 km	MPC · JPL
722834	2006 CM_{85}	—	February 1, 2006	Kitt Peak	Spacewatch	L5	8.9 km	MPC · JPL
722835	2006 CO_{85}	—	December 5, 1996	Kitt Peak	Spacewatch	3:2 · SHU	3.7 km	MPC · JPL
722836	2006 CP_{85}	—	March 17, 2015	Haleakala	Pan-STARRS 1	·	1.1 km	MPC · JPL
722837	2006 CD_{87}	—	April 30, 2014	Haleakala	Pan-STARRS 1	·	3.5 km	MPC · JPL
722838	2006 CM_{88}	—	November 27, 2014	Haleakala	Pan-STARRS 1	L5	6.9 km	MPC · JPL
722839	2006 DA_{5}	—	February 20, 2006	Kitt Peak	Spacewatch	·	1.8 km	MPC · JPL
722840	2006 DM_{5}	—	February 4, 2006	Mount Lemmon	Mount Lemmon Survey	·	2.0 km	MPC · JPL
722841	2006 DR_{8}	—	January 31, 2006	Kitt Peak	Spacewatch	EUP	3.4 km	MPC · JPL
722842	2006 DT_{15}	—	February 1, 2006	Kitt Peak	Spacewatch	·	2.4 km	MPC · JPL
722843	2006 DO_{17}	—	October 4, 2004	Palomar	NEAT	·	2.9 km	MPC · JPL
722844	2006 DQ_{26}	—	October 24, 2005	Mauna Kea	A. Boattini	·	2.1 km	MPC · JPL
722845	2006 DA_{40}	—	November 7, 2005	Mauna Kea	A. Boattini	·	700 m	MPC · JPL
722846	2006 DQ_{45}	—	February 20, 2006	Mount Lemmon	Mount Lemmon Survey	·	2.5 km	MPC · JPL
722847	2006 DF_{46}	—	February 20, 2006	Kitt Peak	Spacewatch	·	1.9 km	MPC · JPL
722848	2006 DH_{56}	—	February 24, 2006	Mount Lemmon	Mount Lemmon Survey	·	1.6 km	MPC · JPL
722849	2006 DP_{58}	—	February 24, 2006	Mount Lemmon	Mount Lemmon Survey	·	1.5 km	MPC · JPL
722850	2006 DK_{70}	—	August 25, 2003	Cerro Tololo	Deep Ecliptic Survey	·	1.2 km	MPC · JPL
722851	2006 DO_{70}	—	February 21, 2006	Mount Lemmon	Mount Lemmon Survey	·	890 m	MPC · JPL
722852	2006 DA_{75}	—	February 24, 2006	Kitt Peak	Spacewatch	·	1.0 km	MPC · JPL
722853	2006 DK_{83}	—	November 19, 1995	Kitt Peak	Spacewatch	AGN	1.0 km	MPC · JPL
722854	2006 DE_{89}	—	February 24, 2006	Kitt Peak	Spacewatch	·	980 m	MPC · JPL
722855	2006 DE_{92}	—	February 24, 2006	Mount Lemmon	Mount Lemmon Survey	LIX	3.3 km	MPC · JPL
722856	2006 DT_{98}	—	February 25, 2006	Kitt Peak	Spacewatch	·	510 m	MPC · JPL
722857	2006 DA_{99}	—	July 24, 2003	Palomar	NEAT	·	1.4 km	MPC · JPL
722858	2006 DU_{102}	—	February 25, 2006	Catalina	CSS	·	2.0 km	MPC · JPL
722859	2006 DZ_{103}	—	January 23, 2006	Mount Lemmon	Mount Lemmon Survey	·	1.8 km	MPC · JPL
722860	2006 DK_{109}	—	February 25, 2006	Kitt Peak	Spacewatch	·	990 m	MPC · JPL
722861	2006 DY_{111}	—	February 27, 2006	Mount Lemmon	Mount Lemmon Survey	·	520 m	MPC · JPL
722862	2006 DB_{112}	—	February 27, 2006	Mount Lemmon	Mount Lemmon Survey	EOS	1.5 km	MPC · JPL
722863	2006 DL_{117}	—	February 27, 2006	Kitt Peak	Spacewatch	·	1.1 km	MPC · JPL
722864	2006 DV_{117}	—	February 27, 2006	Kitt Peak	Spacewatch	·	1.3 km	MPC · JPL
722865	2006 DT_{125}	—	November 7, 2005	Mauna Kea	A. Boattini	·	610 m	MPC · JPL
722866	2006 DC_{127}	—	February 2, 2006	Mount Lemmon	Mount Lemmon Survey	·	2.9 km	MPC · JPL
722867	2006 DR_{128}	—	February 25, 2006	Kitt Peak	Spacewatch	AGN	1.2 km	MPC · JPL
722868	2006 DC_{130}	—	February 25, 2006	Kitt Peak	Spacewatch	·	850 m	MPC · JPL
722869	2006 DU_{138}	—	February 25, 2006	Kitt Peak	Spacewatch	L5	10 km	MPC · JPL
722870	2006 DA_{146}	—	October 24, 2005	Mauna Kea	A. Boattini	·	2.0 km	MPC · JPL
722871	2006 DA_{148}	—	February 25, 2006	Mount Lemmon	Mount Lemmon Survey	·	890 m	MPC · JPL
722872	2006 DL_{151}	—	February 25, 2006	Mount Lemmon	Mount Lemmon Survey	3:2 · SHU	5.1 km	MPC · JPL
722873	2006 DB_{154}	—	February 25, 2006	Kitt Peak	Spacewatch	·	1.6 km	MPC · JPL
722874	2006 DD_{158}	—	February 27, 2006	Kitt Peak	Spacewatch	·	1.2 km	MPC · JPL
722875	2006 DO_{160}	—	February 27, 2006	Kitt Peak	Spacewatch	L5	7.9 km	MPC · JPL
722876	2006 DY_{161}	—	February 27, 2006	Mount Lemmon	Mount Lemmon Survey	·	2.3 km	MPC · JPL
722877	2006 DS_{162}	—	February 27, 2006	Mount Lemmon	Mount Lemmon Survey	·	930 m	MPC · JPL
722878	2006 DB_{166}	—	December 3, 2005	Mauna Kea	A. Boattini	·	1.8 km	MPC · JPL
722879	2006 DQ_{171}	—	February 27, 2006	Kitt Peak	Spacewatch	·	3.1 km	MPC · JPL
722880	2006 DH_{181}	—	February 27, 2006	Kitt Peak	Spacewatch	·	3.0 km	MPC · JPL
722881	2006 DM_{181}	—	February 27, 2006	Kitt Peak	Spacewatch	·	1.1 km	MPC · JPL
722882	2006 DB_{188}	—	February 27, 2006	Kitt Peak	Spacewatch	·	1.8 km	MPC · JPL
722883	2006 DP_{190}	—	February 27, 2006	Kitt Peak	Spacewatch	·	2.7 km	MPC · JPL
722884	2006 DQ_{206}	—	February 25, 2006	Kitt Peak	Spacewatch	·	910 m	MPC · JPL
722885	2006 DJ_{213}	—	February 25, 2006	Mount Lemmon	Mount Lemmon Survey	·	1.8 km	MPC · JPL
722886	2006 DH_{217}	—	February 20, 2006	Kitt Peak	Spacewatch	·	2.9 km	MPC · JPL
722887	2006 DC_{218}	—	February 27, 2006	Kitt Peak	Spacewatch	·	2.4 km	MPC · JPL
722888	2006 DR_{219}	—	February 20, 2006	Mount Lemmon	Mount Lemmon Survey	·	2.1 km	MPC · JPL
722889	2006 DW_{220}	—	September 27, 2009	Mount Lemmon	Mount Lemmon Survey	·	2.6 km	MPC · JPL
722890	2006 DB_{222}	—	February 25, 2006	Mount Lemmon	Mount Lemmon Survey	·	1.0 km	MPC · JPL
722891	2006 DZ_{222}	—	February 25, 2006	Kitt Peak	Spacewatch	L5	10 km	MPC · JPL
722892	2006 DS_{223}	—	March 26, 2017	Mount Lemmon	Mount Lemmon Survey	THM	1.8 km	MPC · JPL
722893	2006 DZ_{224}	—	February 27, 2006	Kitt Peak	Spacewatch	(7744)	1.3 km	MPC · JPL
722894	2006 DD_{225}	—	February 27, 2006	Mount Lemmon	Mount Lemmon Survey	KOR	1.3 km	MPC · JPL
722895	2006 DP_{225}	—	February 20, 2006	Kitt Peak	Spacewatch	L5	9.5 km	MPC · JPL
722896	2006 DG_{227}	—	February 20, 2006	Kitt Peak	Spacewatch	·	2.1 km	MPC · JPL
722897	2006 EW_{2}	—	January 28, 2006	Mount Lemmon	Mount Lemmon Survey	THM	2.5 km	MPC · JPL
722898	2006 EC_{3}	—	January 23, 2006	Kitt Peak	Spacewatch	·	1.5 km	MPC · JPL
722899	2006 EX_{3}	—	January 26, 2006	Mount Lemmon	Mount Lemmon Survey	·	2.7 km	MPC · JPL
722900	2006 EQ_{6}	—	January 30, 2006	Kitt Peak	Spacewatch	·	1.9 km	MPC · JPL

== 722901–723000 ==
back to top

Designation			Discovery			Properties		Ref
Permanent	Provisional	Named after	Date	Site	Discoverer(s)	Category	Diam.	Ref
722901	2006 ES_{7}	—	March 2, 2006	Kitt Peak	Spacewatch	·	1.7 km	MPC · JPL
722902	2006 EH_{11}	—	March 2, 2006	Kitt Peak	Spacewatch	·	760 m	MPC · JPL
722903	2006 EQ_{21}	—	January 30, 2006	Kitt Peak	Spacewatch	·	790 m	MPC · JPL
722904	2006 ED_{24}	—	January 26, 2006	Kitt Peak	Spacewatch	·	1.1 km	MPC · JPL
722905	2006 EA_{31}	—	March 3, 2006	Kitt Peak	Spacewatch	·	1.7 km	MPC · JPL
722906	2006 EK_{31}	—	March 3, 2006	Kitt Peak	Spacewatch	·	3.4 km	MPC · JPL
722907	2006 EM_{33}	—	March 3, 2006	Mount Lemmon	Mount Lemmon Survey	·	2.1 km	MPC · JPL
722908	2006 EM_{34}	—	January 20, 2002	Anderson Mesa	LONEOS	NYS	1.2 km	MPC · JPL
722909	2006 EY_{35}	—	October 4, 1999	Kitt Peak	Spacewatch	HOF	2.1 km	MPC · JPL
722910	2006 EL_{43}	—	March 5, 2006	Mount Lemmon	Mount Lemmon Survey	·	1.1 km	MPC · JPL
722911	2006 EV_{45}	—	October 10, 2004	Kitt Peak	Deep Ecliptic Survey	MAS	520 m	MPC · JPL
722912	2006 EJ_{46}	—	January 27, 2006	Mount Lemmon	Mount Lemmon Survey	·	1 km	MPC · JPL
722913	2006 ET_{47}	—	March 4, 2006	Kitt Peak	Spacewatch	·	1.7 km	MPC · JPL
722914	2006 EC_{54}	—	February 2, 2006	Mount Lemmon	Mount Lemmon Survey	HYG	2.0 km	MPC · JPL
722915	2006 EV_{54}	—	March 5, 2006	Kitt Peak	Spacewatch	·	970 m	MPC · JPL
722916	2006 EM_{61}	—	March 5, 2006	Kitt Peak	Spacewatch	·	1.9 km	MPC · JPL
722917	2006 ED_{62}	—	March 5, 2006	Kitt Peak	Spacewatch	·	1.1 km	MPC · JPL
722918	2006 EM_{66}	—	March 6, 2006	Kitt Peak	Spacewatch	·	530 m	MPC · JPL
722919	2006 ER_{73}	—	March 5, 2006	Kitt Peak	Spacewatch	·	1.4 km	MPC · JPL
722920	2006 EQ_{74}	—	January 30, 2006	Kitt Peak	Spacewatch	THM	1.7 km	MPC · JPL
722921	2006 ES_{76}	—	September 26, 2011	Haleakala	Pan-STARRS 1	·	630 m	MPC · JPL
722922	2006 EU_{76}	—	March 2, 2006	Kitt Peak	Spacewatch	·	1.8 km	MPC · JPL
722923	2006 EF_{77}	—	March 2, 2006	Kitt Peak	Spacewatch	·	510 m	MPC · JPL
722924	2006 EJ_{79}	—	August 24, 2011	Haleakala	Pan-STARRS 1	L5	6.8 km	MPC · JPL
722925	2006 EL_{79}	—	March 5, 2006	Kitt Peak	Spacewatch	·	490 m	MPC · JPL
722926	2006 EM_{79}	—	April 15, 2012	Haleakala	Pan-STARRS 1	·	2.0 km	MPC · JPL
722927	2006 ED_{80}	—	February 1, 2010	WISE	WISE	·	2.4 km	MPC · JPL
722928	2006 EH_{82}	—	March 3, 2006	Kitt Peak	Spacewatch	·	1.7 km	MPC · JPL
722929	2006 EM_{83}	—	March 2, 2006	Kitt Peak	Spacewatch	·	1.6 km	MPC · JPL
722930	2006 EV_{83}	—	March 5, 2006	Kitt Peak	Spacewatch	KON	1.7 km	MPC · JPL
722931	2006 FJ_{4}	—	March 23, 2006	Kitt Peak	Spacewatch	THM	2.2 km	MPC · JPL
722932	2006 FV_{7}	—	March 23, 2006	Kitt Peak	Spacewatch	·	1.5 km	MPC · JPL
722933	2006 FW_{10}	—	September 19, 1998	Apache Point	SDSS	·	2.7 km	MPC · JPL
722934	2006 FA_{11}	—	September 5, 2000	Apache Point	SDSS Collaboration	·	1.1 km	MPC · JPL
722935	2006 FK_{40}	—	March 25, 2006	Kitt Peak	Spacewatch	·	1.9 km	MPC · JPL
722936	2006 FH_{56}	—	March 26, 2006	Mount Lemmon	Mount Lemmon Survey	·	490 m	MPC · JPL
722937	2006 FA_{57}	—	March 24, 2006	Mount Lemmon	Mount Lemmon Survey	·	550 m	MPC · JPL
722938	2006 FD_{57}	—	February 26, 2011	Mount Lemmon	Mount Lemmon Survey	HYG	2.1 km	MPC · JPL
722939	2006 FV_{57}	—	February 26, 2014	Haleakala	Pan-STARRS 1	HNS	860 m	MPC · JPL
722940	2006 FE_{58}	—	March 20, 2006	Bergisch Gladbach	W. Bickel	LIX	3.6 km	MPC · JPL
722941	2006 FR_{58}	—	September 14, 2007	Catalina	CSS	·	1.5 km	MPC · JPL
722942	2006 FJ_{61}	—	March 23, 2006	Kitt Peak	Spacewatch	·	2.1 km	MPC · JPL
722943	2006 GG_{18}	—	April 2, 2006	Kitt Peak	Spacewatch	·	1.3 km	MPC · JPL
722944	2006 GA_{35}	—	April 7, 2006	Kitt Peak	Spacewatch	ADE	1.8 km	MPC · JPL
722945	2006 GN_{44}	—	April 2, 2006	Kitt Peak	Spacewatch	·	1.9 km	MPC · JPL
722946	2006 GV_{48}	—	April 9, 2006	Kitt Peak	Spacewatch	(895)	3.2 km	MPC · JPL
722947	2006 GS_{56}	—	February 27, 2006	Kitt Peak	Spacewatch	·	1.5 km	MPC · JPL
722948	2006 GF_{57}	—	April 2, 2006	Kitt Peak	Spacewatch	·	2.3 km	MPC · JPL
722949	2006 GG_{57}	—	August 31, 2011	Haleakala	Pan-STARRS 1	EUN	840 m	MPC · JPL
722950	2006 GH_{57}	—	March 21, 2017	Mount Lemmon	Mount Lemmon Survey	·	2.6 km	MPC · JPL
722951	2006 GM_{57}	—	May 14, 2015	Haleakala	Pan-STARRS 1	·	1.4 km	MPC · JPL
722952	2006 GD_{58}	—	June 18, 2015	Haleakala	Pan-STARRS 1	V	600 m	MPC · JPL
722953	2006 GS_{58}	—	April 2, 2006	Kitt Peak	Spacewatch	·	1.1 km	MPC · JPL
722954	2006 GB_{59}	—	April 8, 2006	Kitt Peak	Spacewatch	·	1.3 km	MPC · JPL
722955	2006 HQ_{19}	—	April 19, 2006	Kitt Peak	Spacewatch	EOS	1.5 km	MPC · JPL
722956	2006 HP_{20}	—	March 25, 2006	Kitt Peak	Spacewatch	·	1.2 km	MPC · JPL
722957	2006 HQ_{24}	—	April 20, 2006	Kitt Peak	Spacewatch	·	460 m	MPC · JPL
722958	2006 HO_{27}	—	April 20, 2006	Kitt Peak	Spacewatch	·	1.1 km	MPC · JPL
722959	2006 HK_{28}	—	April 20, 2006	Kitt Peak	Spacewatch	THB	2.3 km	MPC · JPL
722960	2006 HG_{41}	—	April 21, 2006	Kitt Peak	Spacewatch	·	2.2 km	MPC · JPL
722961	2006 HN_{41}	—	April 21, 2006	Kitt Peak	Spacewatch	·	1.3 km	MPC · JPL
722962	2006 HJ_{47}	—	April 21, 2006	Mount Lemmon	Mount Lemmon Survey	·	2.2 km	MPC · JPL
722963	2006 HM_{61}	—	March 23, 2006	Mount Lemmon	Mount Lemmon Survey	·	1.8 km	MPC · JPL
722964	2006 HE_{62}	—	April 24, 2006	Kitt Peak	Spacewatch	·	2.1 km	MPC · JPL
722965	2006 HT_{62}	—	April 24, 2006	Kitt Peak	Spacewatch	·	2.4 km	MPC · JPL
722966	2006 HR_{65}	—	April 24, 2006	Kitt Peak	Spacewatch	·	2.6 km	MPC · JPL
722967	2006 HG_{73}	—	April 25, 2006	Kitt Peak	Spacewatch	VER	3.0 km	MPC · JPL
722968	2006 HO_{74}	—	April 25, 2006	Kitt Peak	Spacewatch	·	2.5 km	MPC · JPL
722969	2006 HL_{76}	—	April 25, 2006	Kitt Peak	Spacewatch	·	3.6 km	MPC · JPL
722970	2006 HZ_{82}	—	April 26, 2006	Kitt Peak	Spacewatch	·	2.4 km	MPC · JPL
722971	2006 HP_{84}	—	April 26, 2006	Kitt Peak	Spacewatch	·	2.4 km	MPC · JPL
722972	2006 HF_{94}	—	April 29, 2006	Kitt Peak	Spacewatch	·	2.7 km	MPC · JPL
722973	2006 HJ_{97}	—	April 30, 2006	Kitt Peak	Spacewatch	·	2.6 km	MPC · JPL
722974	2006 HU_{99}	—	April 24, 2006	Mount Lemmon	Mount Lemmon Survey	EUN	1.0 km	MPC · JPL
722975	2006 HL_{109}	—	April 29, 2006	Kitt Peak	Spacewatch	EOS	1.9 km	MPC · JPL
722976	2006 HY_{117}	—	April 29, 2006	Kitt Peak	Spacewatch	·	2.8 km	MPC · JPL
722977	2006 HV_{118}	—	April 30, 2006	Kitt Peak	Spacewatch	LUT	4.0 km	MPC · JPL
722978	2006 HR_{121}	—	April 30, 2006	Catalina	CSS	·	3.9 km	MPC · JPL
722979	2006 HS_{121}	—	April 30, 2006	Catalina	CSS	·	2.8 km	MPC · JPL
722980	2006 HL_{134}	—	March 24, 2006	Mount Lemmon	Mount Lemmon Survey	·	2.1 km	MPC · JPL
722981	2006 HM_{135}	—	April 26, 2006	Cerro Tololo	Deep Ecliptic Survey	·	1.6 km	MPC · JPL
722982	2006 HC_{136}	—	April 2, 2006	Kitt Peak	Spacewatch	·	2.1 km	MPC · JPL
722983	2006 HR_{136}	—	November 20, 2003	Kitt Peak	Spacewatch	ELF	3.2 km	MPC · JPL
722984	2006 HJ_{142}	—	January 26, 2006	Kitt Peak	Spacewatch	·	1.1 km	MPC · JPL
722985	2006 HR_{148}	—	April 27, 2006	Cerro Tololo	Deep Ecliptic Survey	·	2.5 km	MPC · JPL
722986	2006 HS_{150}	—	April 25, 2006	Mount Lemmon	Mount Lemmon Survey	·	940 m	MPC · JPL
722987	2006 HD_{155}	—	April 21, 2006	Mount Lemmon	Mount Lemmon Survey	(260)	3.1 km	MPC · JPL
722988	2006 HG_{155}	—	April 26, 2006	Siding Spring	SSS	T_{j} (2.96)	3.0 km	MPC · JPL
722989	2006 HR_{155}	—	October 22, 2009	Mount Lemmon	Mount Lemmon Survey	·	2.2 km	MPC · JPL
722990	2006 HW_{155}	—	April 21, 2006	Kitt Peak	Spacewatch	·	560 m	MPC · JPL
722991	2006 HF_{156}	—	April 30, 2006	Kitt Peak	Spacewatch	·	2.2 km	MPC · JPL
722992	2006 HJ_{156}	—	April 24, 2006	Kitt Peak	Spacewatch	PHO	620 m	MPC · JPL
722993	2006 HO_{156}	—	November 9, 2013	Haleakala	Pan-STARRS 1	·	1.8 km	MPC · JPL
722994	2006 HC_{157}	—	October 27, 2008	Mount Lemmon	Mount Lemmon Survey	·	2.7 km	MPC · JPL
722995	2006 HF_{157}	—	October 9, 2008	Catalina	CSS	·	2.9 km	MPC · JPL
722996	2006 HL_{157}	—	April 19, 2006	Mount Lemmon	Mount Lemmon Survey	VER	2.1 km	MPC · JPL
722997	2006 HO_{157}	—	September 10, 2013	Haleakala	Pan-STARRS 1	·	2.4 km	MPC · JPL
722998	2006 HW_{157}	—	September 13, 2007	Mount Lemmon	Mount Lemmon Survey	(5)	1.0 km	MPC · JPL
722999	2006 HY_{158}	—	March 14, 2016	Mount Lemmon	Mount Lemmon Survey	·	530 m	MPC · JPL
723000	2006 HS_{159}	—	April 21, 2006	Kitt Peak	Spacewatch	·	510 m	MPC · JPL

back to top

== Meaning of names ==
As minor planet discoveries are confirmed, they are given a permanent number by the IAU's Minor Planet Center (MPC), and the discoverers can then submit names for them, following the IAU's naming conventions. The list below concerns those minor planets in the specified number-range that have received names, and explains the meanings of those names.

Official naming citations of newly named small Solar System bodies are approved and published in a bulletin by IAU's Working Group for Small Bodies Nomenclature (WGSBN). Before May 2021, citations were published in MPC's Minor Planet Circulars for many decades. Recent citations can also be found on the JPL Small-Body Database (SBDB). Until his death in 2016, German astronomer Lutz D. Schmadel compiled these citations into the Dictionary of Minor Planet Names (DMP) and regularly updated the collection.

Based on Paul Herget's The Names of the Minor Planets, Schmadel also researched the unclear origin of numerous asteroids, most of which had been named prior to World War II. This article incorporates text from this source, which is in the public domain: SBDB New namings may only be added to this list below after official publication as the preannouncement of names is condemned. The WGSBN publishes a comprehensive guideline for the naming rules of non-cometary small Solar System bodies.

Named minor planet	Provisional	This minor planet was named for...	Ref · Catalog
722063 Andrasz	2005 CO_{83}	Józef Andrasz (1891–1963), Polish Jesuit priest who studied philosophy and theology in Poland and Grafenberg (Moravia).	IAU · 722063
