= List of minor planets: 830001–831000 =

The following is a partial list of minor planets, running from minor-planet number 830001 through 831000, inclusive. The primary data for this and other partial lists is based on JPL's "Small-Body Orbital Elements" and data available from the Minor Planet Center. Critical list information is also provided by the MPC, unless otherwise specified from Lowell Observatory. A detailed description of the table's columns and additional sources are given on the main page including a complete list of every page in this series, and a statistical break-up on the dynamical classification of minor planets.

Also see the summary list of all named bodies in numerical and alphabetical order, and the corresponding naming citations for the number range of this particular list. New namings may only be added to this list after official publication, as the preannouncement of names is condemned by the Working Group for Small Bodies Nomenclature of the International Astronomical Union.

Near-Earth obj.	MBA (inner)	MBA (outer)	Centaur
Mars-crosser	MBA (middle)	Jupiter trojan	Trans-Neptunian obj.
Unclassified

== 830001–830100 ==
Designation			Discovery			Properties		Ref
Permanent	Provisional	Named after	Date	Site	Discoverer(s)	Category	Diam.	Ref
830001	2007 RT_{381}	—	August 24, 2007	Kitt Peak	Spacewatch	AEG	1.8 km	MPC · JPL
830002	2007 RB_{385}	—	September 10, 2007	Mount Lemmon	Mount Lemmon Survey	·	1.9 km	MPC · JPL
830003	2007 SE_{7}	—	September 18, 2007	Kitt Peak	Spacewatch	·	920 m	MPC · JPL
830004	2007 SW_{9}	—	September 18, 2007	Kitt Peak	Spacewatch	NYS	670 m	MPC · JPL
830005	2007 SF_{15}	—	September 23, 2007	Charleston	R. Holmes	NYS	660 m	MPC · JPL
830006	2007 SM_{16}	—	August 23, 2007	Kitt Peak	Spacewatch	·	1.8 km	MPC · JPL
830007	2007 SJ_{22}	—	September 21, 2007	Kitt Peak	Spacewatch	·	1.4 km	MPC · JPL
830008	2007 SV_{24}	—	September 24, 2007	Kitt Peak	Spacewatch	THM	1.6 km	MPC · JPL
830009	2007 SL_{25}	—	September 19, 2007	Kitt Peak	Spacewatch	·	1.5 km	MPC · JPL
830010	2007 SQ_{25}	—	September 9, 2007	Kitt Peak	Spacewatch	H	430 m	MPC · JPL
830011	2007 SU_{25}	—	September 18, 2007	Kitt Peak	Spacewatch	·	1.1 km	MPC · JPL
830012	2007 SQ_{26}	—	November 11, 2013	Mount Lemmon	Mount Lemmon Survey	·	2.1 km	MPC · JPL
830013	2007 SC_{27}	—	November 17, 2014	Haleakala	Pan-STARRS 1	·	820 m	MPC · JPL
830014	2007 SM_{28}	—	September 18, 2007	Kitt Peak	Spacewatch	·	1.4 km	MPC · JPL
830015	2007 SR_{28}	—	September 21, 2007	Kitt Peak	Spacewatch	·	930 m	MPC · JPL
830016	2007 SH_{29}	—	September 19, 2007	Kitt Peak	Spacewatch	DOR	1.5 km	MPC · JPL
830017	2007 TR_{2}	—	September 14, 2007	Mount Lemmon	Mount Lemmon Survey	·	970 m	MPC · JPL
830018	2007 TT_{2}	—	October 2, 2007	Majdanak	Sergeyev, A., Korotkiy, S.	V	400 m	MPC · JPL
830019	2007 TQ_{3}	—	October 5, 2007	Bergisch Gladbach	W. Bickel	·	1.1 km	MPC · JPL
830020	2007 TU_{3}	—	September 14, 2007	Mount Lemmon	Mount Lemmon Survey	·	990 m	MPC · JPL
830021	2007 TA_{5}	—	October 3, 2007	Eskridge	G. Hug	·	570 m	MPC · JPL
830022	2007 TU_{7}	—	October 7, 2007	Catalina	CSS	·	1.4 km	MPC · JPL
830023	2007 TZ_{7}	—	October 7, 2007	Cordell-Lorenz	D. T. Durig	MRX	760 m	MPC · JPL
830024	2007 TD_{18}	—	September 14, 2007	Mount Lemmon	Mount Lemmon Survey	NYS	840 m	MPC · JPL
830025	2007 TB_{32}	—	August 23, 2007	Kitt Peak	Spacewatch	·	780 m	MPC · JPL
830026	2007 TO_{33}	—	October 6, 2007	Kitt Peak	Spacewatch	·	1.3 km	MPC · JPL
830027	2007 TT_{33}	—	October 6, 2007	Kitt Peak	Spacewatch	·	1.3 km	MPC · JPL
830028	2007 TO_{45}	—	August 20, 2000	Kitt Peak	Spacewatch	·	500 m	MPC · JPL
830029	2007 TS_{47}	—	September 14, 2007	Mount Lemmon	Mount Lemmon Survey	·	2.1 km	MPC · JPL
830030	2007 TU_{55}	—	September 8, 2007	Mount Lemmon	Mount Lemmon Survey	·	770 m	MPC · JPL
830031	2007 TO_{56}	—	October 4, 2007	Kitt Peak	Spacewatch	MAS	690 m	MPC · JPL
830032	2007 TN_{57}	—	October 4, 2007	Kitt Peak	Spacewatch	·	790 m	MPC · JPL
830033	2007 TB_{62}	—	October 7, 2007	Mount Lemmon	Mount Lemmon Survey	·	1.1 km	MPC · JPL
830034	2007 TL_{70}	—	September 18, 2007	Mount Lemmon	Mount Lemmon Survey	(5)	950 m	MPC · JPL
830035	2007 TB_{81}	—	September 5, 2007	Mount Lemmon	Mount Lemmon Survey	·	1.3 km	MPC · JPL
830036	2007 TW_{84}	—	October 8, 2007	Catalina	CSS	·	1.5 km	MPC · JPL
830037	2007 TX_{86}	—	October 8, 2007	Mount Lemmon	Mount Lemmon Survey	MRX	780 m	MPC · JPL
830038	2007 TE_{107}	—	September 13, 2007	Mount Lemmon	Mount Lemmon Survey	·	1.4 km	MPC · JPL
830039	2007 TC_{113}	—	October 8, 2007	Catalina	CSS	·	1.1 km	MPC · JPL
830040	2007 TD_{150}	—	September 13, 2007	Catalina	CSS	·	490 m	MPC · JPL
830041	2007 TV_{151}	—	October 7, 2007	Catalina	CSS	·	1.1 km	MPC · JPL
830042	2007 TC_{166}	—	October 11, 2007	Mauna Kea	D. D. Balam, K. M. Perrett	ADE	1.9 km	MPC · JPL
830043	2007 TZ_{171}	—	October 7, 2007	Catalina	CSS	·	1.6 km	MPC · JPL
830044	2007 TJ_{179}	—	October 7, 2007	Catalina	CSS	·	2.1 km	MPC · JPL
830045	2007 TN_{184}	—	October 12, 2007	Mount Lemmon	Mount Lemmon Survey	·	640 m	MPC · JPL
830046	2007 TQ_{208}	—	October 10, 2007	Mount Lemmon	Mount Lemmon Survey	·	1.2 km	MPC · JPL
830047	2007 TW_{208}	—	October 10, 2007	Mount Lemmon	Mount Lemmon Survey	·	1.7 km	MPC · JPL
830048	2007 TO_{209}	—	September 10, 2007	Mount Lemmon	Mount Lemmon Survey	·	1.3 km	MPC · JPL
830049	2007 TA_{212}	—	September 15, 2007	Mount Lemmon	Mount Lemmon Survey	·	2.4 km	MPC · JPL
830050	2007 TV_{235}	—	October 9, 2007	Mount Lemmon	Mount Lemmon Survey	MAR	600 m	MPC · JPL
830051	2007 TQ_{236}	—	October 9, 2007	Mount Lemmon	Mount Lemmon Survey	·	730 m	MPC · JPL
830052	2007 TG_{237}	—	October 9, 2007	Mount Lemmon	Mount Lemmon Survey	·	2.2 km	MPC · JPL
830053	2007 TC_{241}	—	October 7, 2007	Mount Lemmon	Mount Lemmon Survey	·	960 m	MPC · JPL
830054	2007 TZ_{241}	—	August 10, 2007	Kitt Peak	Spacewatch	·	500 m	MPC · JPL
830055	2007 TA_{243}	—	September 15, 2007	Anderson Mesa	LONEOS	·	880 m	MPC · JPL
830056	2007 TT_{245}	—	October 9, 2007	Kitt Peak	Spacewatch	·	1.1 km	MPC · JPL
830057	2007 TD_{250}	—	February 25, 2006	Kitt Peak	Spacewatch	·	930 m	MPC · JPL
830058	2007 TC_{252}	—	October 12, 2007	Mount Lemmon	Mount Lemmon Survey	·	910 m	MPC · JPL
830059	2007 TZ_{253}	—	October 8, 2007	Mount Lemmon	Mount Lemmon Survey	·	1.9 km	MPC · JPL
830060	2007 TE_{266}	—	October 11, 2007	Mount Lemmon	Mount Lemmon Survey	·	1.3 km	MPC · JPL
830061	2007 TU_{266}	—	September 25, 2007	Mount Lemmon	Mount Lemmon Survey	MAS	580 m	MPC · JPL
830062	2007 TX_{274}	—	October 11, 2007	Kitt Peak	Spacewatch	AGN	740 m	MPC · JPL
830063	2007 TQ_{276}	—	October 11, 2007	Mount Lemmon	Mount Lemmon Survey	·	480 m	MPC · JPL
830064	2007 TM_{278}	—	October 11, 2007	Mount Lemmon	Mount Lemmon Survey	·	460 m	MPC · JPL
830065	2007 TY_{279}	—	September 13, 2007	Mount Lemmon	Mount Lemmon Survey	T_{j} (2.97)	2.6 km	MPC · JPL
830066	2007 TN_{284}	—	October 9, 2007	Mount Lemmon	Mount Lemmon Survey	AGN	790 m	MPC · JPL
830067	2007 TY_{290}	—	October 10, 2002	Sacramento Peak	SDSS	(18466)	1.6 km	MPC · JPL
830068	2007 TH_{297}	—	October 5, 2007	Kitt Peak	Spacewatch	·	1.0 km	MPC · JPL
830069	2007 TB_{305}	—	September 11, 2007	Mount Lemmon	Mount Lemmon Survey	MAS	520 m	MPC · JPL
830070	2007 TY_{305}	—	October 8, 2007	Mount Lemmon	Mount Lemmon Survey	·	1.4 km	MPC · JPL
830071	2007 TL_{312}	—	September 14, 2007	Mount Lemmon	Mount Lemmon Survey	·	1.2 km	MPC · JPL
830072	2007 TD_{313}	—	October 11, 2007	Mount Lemmon	Mount Lemmon Survey	·	1.4 km	MPC · JPL
830073	2007 TZ_{321}	—	September 9, 2007	Mount Lemmon	Mount Lemmon Survey	·	980 m	MPC · JPL
830074	2007 TB_{323}	—	October 11, 2007	Kitt Peak	Spacewatch	·	750 m	MPC · JPL
830075	2007 TV_{324}	—	October 11, 2007	Kitt Peak	Spacewatch	·	1.4 km	MPC · JPL
830076	2007 TF_{328}	—	October 11, 2007	Kitt Peak	Spacewatch	·	1.6 km	MPC · JPL
830077	2007 TA_{329}	—	October 11, 2007	Kitt Peak	Spacewatch	·	1.3 km	MPC · JPL
830078	2007 TK_{329}	—	October 14, 2001	Sacramento Peak	SDSS	·	2.9 km	MPC · JPL
830079	2007 TL_{341}	—	October 9, 2007	Mount Lemmon	Mount Lemmon Survey	WIT	700 m	MPC · JPL
830080	2007 TK_{342}	—	October 10, 2007	Mount Lemmon	Mount Lemmon Survey	·	970 m	MPC · JPL
830081	2007 TU_{349}	—	August 13, 2007	XuYi	PMO NEO Survey Program	·	800 m	MPC · JPL
830082	2007 TH_{353}	—	September 9, 2007	Palomar Mountain	M. E. Schwamb, M. E. Brown	·	1.3 km	MPC · JPL
830083	2007 TK_{360}	—	October 15, 2007	Mount Lemmon	Mount Lemmon Survey	GEF	910 m	MPC · JPL
830084	2007 TP_{365}	—	September 15, 2007	Mount Lemmon	Mount Lemmon Survey	·	1.2 km	MPC · JPL
830085	2007 TS_{368}	—	October 11, 2007	Mount Lemmon	Mount Lemmon Survey	AGN	730 m	MPC · JPL
830086	2007 TB_{374}	—	October 14, 2007	Mount Lemmon	Mount Lemmon Survey	T_{j} (2.85)	3.6 km	MPC · JPL
830087	2007 TF_{375}	—	October 15, 2007	Mount Lemmon	Mount Lemmon Survey	·	1.2 km	MPC · JPL
830088	2007 TL_{375}	—	October 15, 2007	Mount Lemmon	Mount Lemmon Survey	·	1.4 km	MPC · JPL
830089	2007 TY_{404}	—	October 11, 2007	Kitt Peak	Spacewatch	·	670 m	MPC · JPL
830090	2007 TL_{411}	—	October 13, 2007	Catalina	CSS	·	1.2 km	MPC · JPL
830091	2007 TZ_{414}	—	October 8, 2007	Kitt Peak	Spacewatch	KOR	930 m	MPC · JPL
830092	2007 TP_{424}	—	October 8, 2007	Kitt Peak	Spacewatch	·	1.2 km	MPC · JPL
830093	2007 TM_{430}	—	October 12, 2007	Kitt Peak	Spacewatch	(895)	2.6 km	MPC · JPL
830094	2007 TQ_{432}	—	October 7, 2007	Kitt Peak	Spacewatch	·	1.7 km	MPC · JPL
830095	2007 TW_{435}	—	October 14, 2007	Mount Lemmon	Mount Lemmon Survey	MRX	770 m	MPC · JPL
830096	2007 TW_{443}	—	October 12, 2007	Anderson Mesa	LONEOS	·	1.2 km	MPC · JPL
830097	2007 TW_{452}	—	September 11, 2007	Kitt Peak	Spacewatch	·	520 m	MPC · JPL
830098	2007 TO_{456}	—	October 11, 2002	Sacramento Peak	SDSS	KOR	960 m	MPC · JPL
830099	2007 TH_{458}	—	October 30, 2002	Sacramento Peak	SDSS	H	440 m	MPC · JPL
830100	2007 TD_{459}	—	October 15, 2007	Mount Lemmon	Mount Lemmon Survey	·	970 m	MPC · JPL

== 830101–830200 ==
back to top

Designation			Discovery			Properties		Ref
Permanent	Provisional	Named after	Date	Site	Discoverer(s)	Category	Diam.	Ref
830101	2007 TY_{460}	—	October 11, 2007	Kitt Peak	Spacewatch	·	870 m	MPC · JPL
830102	2007 TT_{462}	—	January 26, 2012	Mount Lemmon	Mount Lemmon Survey	·	410 m	MPC · JPL
830103	2007 TQ_{463}	—	August 18, 2007	Anderson Mesa	LONEOS	·	1.3 km	MPC · JPL
830104	2007 TY_{463}	—	July 25, 2014	Haleakala	Pan-STARRS 1	NYS	770 m	MPC · JPL
830105	2007 TG_{464}	—	October 10, 2007	Mount Lemmon	Mount Lemmon Survey	·	1.3 km	MPC · JPL
830106	2007 TA_{468}	—	October 9, 2007	Mount Lemmon	Mount Lemmon Survey	·	520 m	MPC · JPL
830107	2007 TH_{468}	—	June 23, 2010	WISE	WISE	·	2.6 km	MPC · JPL
830108	2007 TY_{470}	—	October 8, 2007	Mount Lemmon	Mount Lemmon Survey	·	480 m	MPC · JPL
830109	2007 TO_{476}	—	October 2, 2016	Mount Lemmon	Mount Lemmon Survey	PAD	1.2 km	MPC · JPL
830110	2007 TX_{476}	—	October 20, 2016	Mount Lemmon	Mount Lemmon Survey	NEM	1.6 km	MPC · JPL
830111	2007 TF_{477}	—	May 15, 2010	WISE	WISE	·	1.9 km	MPC · JPL
830112	2007 TT_{478}	—	August 27, 2016	Haleakala	Pan-STARRS 1	·	1.4 km	MPC · JPL
830113	2007 TB_{479}	—	February 4, 2016	Haleakala	Pan-STARRS 1	·	670 m	MPC · JPL
830114	2007 TH_{479}	—	October 7, 2007	Mount Lemmon	Mount Lemmon Survey	·	1.5 km	MPC · JPL
830115	2007 TX_{481}	—	October 12, 2007	Mount Lemmon	Mount Lemmon Survey	·	1.9 km	MPC · JPL
830116	2007 TF_{482}	—	October 11, 2007	Mount Lemmon	Mount Lemmon Survey	AGN	960 m	MPC · JPL
830117	2007 TW_{482}	—	October 11, 2007	Mount Lemmon	Mount Lemmon Survey	·	1.5 km	MPC · JPL
830118	2007 TL_{487}	—	October 10, 2007	Mount Lemmon	Mount Lemmon Survey	·	1.2 km	MPC · JPL
830119	2007 TP_{496}	—	October 4, 2007	Mount Lemmon	Mount Lemmon Survey	AEO	770 m	MPC · JPL
830120	2007 TP_{501}	—	October 11, 2007	Mount Lemmon	Mount Lemmon Survey	·	1.3 km	MPC · JPL
830121	2007 TQ_{501}	—	October 8, 2007	Mount Lemmon	Mount Lemmon Survey	·	1.4 km	MPC · JPL
830122	2007 TV_{501}	—	October 12, 2007	Mount Lemmon	Mount Lemmon Survey	·	1.4 km	MPC · JPL
830123	2007 TY_{501}	—	October 5, 2007	Kitt Peak	Spacewatch	AEO	780 m	MPC · JPL
830124	2007 TK_{502}	—	October 15, 2007	Kitt Peak	Spacewatch	·	1.4 km	MPC · JPL
830125	2007 TV_{503}	—	October 12, 2007	Kitt Peak	Spacewatch	·	520 m	MPC · JPL
830126	2007 TN_{504}	—	October 13, 2007	Kitt Peak	Spacewatch	MAS	490 m	MPC · JPL
830127	2007 TO_{508}	—	October 11, 2007	Mount Lemmon	Mount Lemmon Survey	·	2.5 km	MPC · JPL
830128	2007 UA_{13}	—	October 9, 2007	Catalina	CSS	·	1.0 km	MPC · JPL
830129	2007 UR_{14}	—	October 18, 2007	Mount Lemmon	Mount Lemmon Survey	·	860 m	MPC · JPL
830130	2007 UN_{19}	—	October 7, 2007	Mount Lemmon	Mount Lemmon Survey	·	1.3 km	MPC · JPL
830131	2007 UA_{20}	—	October 18, 2007	Mount Lemmon	Mount Lemmon Survey	GEF	690 m	MPC · JPL
830132	2007 UN_{25}	—	October 8, 2007	Kitt Peak	Spacewatch	·	870 m	MPC · JPL
830133	2007 UV_{26}	—	October 16, 2007	Mount Lemmon	Mount Lemmon Survey	·	1.1 km	MPC · JPL
830134	2007 UW_{27}	—	September 15, 2007	Kitt Peak	Spacewatch	·	1.9 km	MPC · JPL
830135	2007 UL_{28}	—	October 16, 2007	Mount Lemmon	Mount Lemmon Survey	·	1.3 km	MPC · JPL
830136	2007 UX_{31}	—	September 14, 2007	Mount Lemmon	Mount Lemmon Survey	·	1.4 km	MPC · JPL
830137	2007 UR_{39}	—	October 20, 2007	Mount Lemmon	Mount Lemmon Survey	·	1.1 km	MPC · JPL
830138	2007 UW_{41}	—	October 16, 2007	Mount Lemmon	Mount Lemmon Survey	(5)	940 m	MPC · JPL
830139	2007 UG_{49}	—	October 24, 2007	Mount Lemmon	Mount Lemmon Survey	·	1.5 km	MPC · JPL
830140	2007 UD_{56}	—	October 30, 2007	Kitt Peak	Spacewatch	·	430 m	MPC · JPL
830141	2007 UR_{56}	—	October 7, 2007	Mount Lemmon	Mount Lemmon Survey	·	1.8 km	MPC · JPL
830142	2007 US_{57}	—	October 30, 2007	Mount Lemmon	Mount Lemmon Survey	·	1 km	MPC · JPL
830143	2007 UL_{61}	—	September 15, 2007	Mount Lemmon	Mount Lemmon Survey	·	700 m	MPC · JPL
830144	2007 UR_{70}	—	October 12, 2007	Kitt Peak	Spacewatch	·	550 m	MPC · JPL
830145	2007 UZ_{71}	—	October 8, 2007	Mount Lemmon	Mount Lemmon Survey	·	700 m	MPC · JPL
830146	2007 UC_{72}	—	March 17, 1993	La Silla	UESAC	RAF	960 m	MPC · JPL
830147	2007 UQ_{72}	—	October 4, 2007	Kitt Peak	Spacewatch	·	1.5 km	MPC · JPL
830148	2007 UZ_{84}	—	October 30, 2007	Kitt Peak	Spacewatch	DOR	1.4 km	MPC · JPL
830149	2007 UE_{93}	—	October 8, 2007	Kitt Peak	Spacewatch	·	990 m	MPC · JPL
830150	2007 UR_{110}	—	October 30, 2007	Mount Lemmon	Mount Lemmon Survey	NYS	870 m	MPC · JPL
830151	2007 UH_{111}	—	October 30, 2007	Mount Lemmon	Mount Lemmon Survey	·	1.7 km	MPC · JPL
830152	2007 UP_{111}	—	September 19, 1998	Sacramento Peak	SDSS	·	1.7 km	MPC · JPL
830153	2007 UA_{118}	—	October 31, 2007	Mount Lemmon	Mount Lemmon Survey	·	1.8 km	MPC · JPL
830154	2007 US_{130}	—	October 20, 2007	Mount Lemmon	Mount Lemmon Survey	·	1.7 km	MPC · JPL
830155	2007 UA_{140}	—	October 16, 2007	Catalina	CSS	·	990 m	MPC · JPL
830156	2007 UB_{147}	—	August 8, 2016	Haleakala	Pan-STARRS 1	MRX	750 m	MPC · JPL
830157	2007 UM_{147}	—	November 24, 2011	Mount Lemmon	Mount Lemmon Survey	V	450 m	MPC · JPL
830158	2007 UP_{152}	—	November 13, 2012	ESA OGS	ESA OGS	·	1.6 km	MPC · JPL
830159	2007 UN_{154}	—	October 19, 2007	Kitt Peak	Spacewatch	·	1.6 km	MPC · JPL
830160	2007 UR_{154}	—	September 6, 2014	Mount Lemmon	Mount Lemmon Survey	·	820 m	MPC · JPL
830161	2007 UG_{161}	—	October 20, 2007	Kitt Peak	Spacewatch	·	2.6 km	MPC · JPL
830162	2007 UC_{162}	—	October 20, 2007	Mount Lemmon	Mount Lemmon Survey	·	1.3 km	MPC · JPL
830163	2007 UT_{163}	—	October 20, 2007	Kitt Peak	Spacewatch	HOF	1.6 km	MPC · JPL
830164	2007 UH_{164}	—	October 18, 2007	Mount Lemmon	Mount Lemmon Survey	·	1.3 km	MPC · JPL
830165	2007 UN_{164}	—	October 20, 2007	Mount Lemmon	Mount Lemmon Survey	·	1.5 km	MPC · JPL
830166	2007 UY_{164}	—	October 16, 2007	Kitt Peak	Spacewatch	·	990 m	MPC · JPL
830167	2007 UC_{165}	—	October 18, 2007	Mount Lemmon	Mount Lemmon Survey	·	1.1 km	MPC · JPL
830168	2007 UX_{165}	—	October 30, 2007	Mount Lemmon	Mount Lemmon Survey	·	730 m	MPC · JPL
830169	2007 VR_{6}	—	November 1, 2007	Kitt Peak	Spacewatch	T_{j} (2)	2.9 km	MPC · JPL
830170	2007 VE_{16}	—	November 1, 2007	Kitt Peak	Spacewatch	·	1.3 km	MPC · JPL
830171	2007 VC_{22}	—	September 5, 2007	Mount Lemmon	Mount Lemmon Survey	·	2.2 km	MPC · JPL
830172	2007 VM_{34}	—	October 8, 2007	Kitt Peak	Spacewatch	·	2.1 km	MPC · JPL
830173	2007 VJ_{39}	—	November 3, 2007	Kitt Peak	Spacewatch	·	580 m	MPC · JPL
830174	2007 VF_{43}	—	September 13, 2007	Mount Lemmon	Mount Lemmon Survey	·	680 m	MPC · JPL
830175	2007 VJ_{46}	—	October 9, 2007	Kitt Peak	Spacewatch	·	1.3 km	MPC · JPL
830176	2007 VP_{47}	—	November 1, 2007	Kitt Peak	Spacewatch	DOR	1.6 km	MPC · JPL
830177	2007 VJ_{50}	—	November 1, 2007	Kitt Peak	Spacewatch	·	1.4 km	MPC · JPL
830178	2007 VB_{52}	—	November 1, 2007	Kitt Peak	Spacewatch	AGN	950 m	MPC · JPL
830179	2007 VH_{57}	—	November 1, 2007	Kitt Peak	Spacewatch	·	1.5 km	MPC · JPL
830180	2007 VJ_{59}	—	November 1, 2007	Kitt Peak	Spacewatch	·	610 m	MPC · JPL
830181	2007 VX_{81}	—	October 16, 2007	Kitt Peak	Spacewatch	·	590 m	MPC · JPL
830182	2007 VU_{103}	—	September 15, 2007	Mount Lemmon	Mount Lemmon Survey	·	450 m	MPC · JPL
830183	2007 VJ_{106}	—	November 3, 2007	Kitt Peak	Spacewatch	·	1.4 km	MPC · JPL
830184	2007 VC_{112}	—	November 3, 2007	Kitt Peak	Spacewatch	·	1.3 km	MPC · JPL
830185	2007 VC_{121}	—	November 5, 2007	Kitt Peak	Spacewatch	PHO	580 m	MPC · JPL
830186	2007 VK_{121}	—	October 16, 2007	Mount Lemmon	Mount Lemmon Survey	·	2.6 km	MPC · JPL
830187	2007 VW_{123}	—	November 5, 2007	Kitt Peak	Spacewatch	·	760 m	MPC · JPL
830188	2007 VE_{126}	—	May 8, 2006	Kitt Peak	Spacewatch	·	1.7 km	MPC · JPL
830189	2007 VB_{134}	—	October 11, 2007	Kitt Peak	Spacewatch	·	830 m	MPC · JPL
830190	2007 VP_{140}	—	October 30, 2007	Mount Lemmon	Mount Lemmon Survey	MAS	450 m	MPC · JPL
830191	2007 VF_{152}	—	March 4, 2006	Mount Lemmon	Mount Lemmon Survey	·	470 m	MPC · JPL
830192	2007 VU_{161}	—	September 18, 2003	Kitt Peak	Spacewatch	·	840 m	MPC · JPL
830193	2007 VP_{182}	—	November 8, 2007	Mount Lemmon	Mount Lemmon Survey	·	1.4 km	MPC · JPL
830194	2007 VP_{186}	—	October 15, 2007	Lulin	LUSS	H	480 m	MPC · JPL
830195	2007 VD_{194}	—	November 5, 2007	Mount Lemmon	Mount Lemmon Survey	·	1.9 km	MPC · JPL
830196	2007 VV_{199}	—	October 10, 2007	Kitt Peak	Spacewatch	HOF	1.8 km	MPC · JPL
830197	2007 VN_{207}	—	November 11, 2007	Mount Lemmon	Mount Lemmon Survey	·	2.1 km	MPC · JPL
830198	2007 VO_{231}	—	October 9, 2007	Mount Lemmon	Mount Lemmon Survey	·	580 m	MPC · JPL
830199	2007 VN_{235}	—	November 9, 2007	Kitt Peak	Spacewatch	·	1.9 km	MPC · JPL
830200	2007 VK_{236}	—	November 3, 2007	Mount Lemmon	Mount Lemmon Survey	·	930 m	MPC · JPL

== 830201–830300 ==
back to top

Designation			Discovery			Properties		Ref
Permanent	Provisional	Named after	Date	Site	Discoverer(s)	Category	Diam.	Ref
830201	2007 VH_{237}	—	October 15, 2007	Kitt Peak	Spacewatch	·	1.1 km	MPC · JPL
830202	2007 VC_{246}	—	October 17, 2007	Mount Lemmon	Mount Lemmon Survey	H	360 m	MPC · JPL
830203	2007 VS_{250}	—	November 9, 2007	Catalina	CSS	·	1.4 km	MPC · JPL
830204	2007 VN_{252}	—	October 15, 2007	Črni Vrh	Skvarč, J.	H	560 m	MPC · JPL
830205	2007 VG_{261}	—	November 1, 2007	Kitt Peak	Spacewatch	·	1.2 km	MPC · JPL
830206	2007 VY_{261}	—	November 13, 2007	Mount Lemmon	Mount Lemmon Survey	·	1.3 km	MPC · JPL
830207	2007 VD_{277}	—	October 7, 2007	Kitt Peak	Spacewatch	·	1.3 km	MPC · JPL
830208	2007 VP_{279}	—	November 4, 2007	Kitt Peak	Spacewatch	·	2.7 km	MPC · JPL
830209	2007 VO_{284}	—	September 19, 1998	Sacramento Peak	SDSS	·	1.1 km	MPC · JPL
830210	2007 VG_{285}	—	November 5, 2007	Kitt Peak	Spacewatch	·	1.6 km	MPC · JPL
830211	2007 VQ_{287}	—	November 12, 2007	Mount Lemmon	Mount Lemmon Survey	·	830 m	MPC · JPL
830212	2007 VQ_{293}	—	October 20, 2007	Mount Lemmon	Mount Lemmon Survey	·	1.4 km	MPC · JPL
830213	2007 VR_{293}	—	October 4, 2002	Sacramento Peak	SDSS	HOF	2.3 km	MPC · JPL
830214	2007 VV_{293}	—	November 5, 2007	Kitt Peak	Spacewatch	·	1.2 km	MPC · JPL
830215	2007 VR_{306}	—	November 1, 2007	Kitt Peak	Spacewatch	·	1.5 km	MPC · JPL
830216	2007 VN_{308}	—	November 6, 2007	Kitt Peak	Spacewatch	·	610 m	MPC · JPL
830217	2007 VO_{314}	—	November 2, 2007	Mount Lemmon	Mount Lemmon Survey	·	980 m	MPC · JPL
830218	2007 VV_{320}	—	November 2, 2007	Mount Lemmon	Mount Lemmon Survey	·	1.4 km	MPC · JPL
830219	2007 VV_{330}	—	November 4, 2007	Kitt Peak	Spacewatch	·	890 m	MPC · JPL
830220	2007 VP_{341}	—	November 9, 2007	Mount Lemmon	Mount Lemmon Survey	·	1.5 km	MPC · JPL
830221	2007 VT_{345}	—	November 2, 2007	Kitt Peak	Spacewatch	·	540 m	MPC · JPL
830222	2007 VW_{346}	—	November 2, 2007	Mount Lemmon	Mount Lemmon Survey	HNS	900 m	MPC · JPL
830223	2007 VY_{346}	—	November 9, 2007	Mount Lemmon	Mount Lemmon Survey	·	1.4 km	MPC · JPL
830224	2007 VG_{347}	—	July 26, 2011	Haleakala	Pan-STARRS 1	·	1.3 km	MPC · JPL
830225	2007 VY_{348}	—	November 2, 2007	Mount Lemmon	Mount Lemmon Survey	·	890 m	MPC · JPL
830226	2007 VE_{349}	—	July 8, 2015	Haleakala	Pan-STARRS 1	·	1.7 km	MPC · JPL
830227	2007 VY_{351}	—	November 2, 2007	Mount Lemmon	Mount Lemmon Survey	DOR	1.8 km	MPC · JPL
830228	2007 VG_{354}	—	November 7, 2007	Kitt Peak	Spacewatch	·	500 m	MPC · JPL
830229	2007 VQ_{357}	—	November 9, 2007	Mount Lemmon	Mount Lemmon Survey	·	1.1 km	MPC · JPL
830230	2007 VW_{357}	—	October 4, 2016	Mount Lemmon	Mount Lemmon Survey	·	1.3 km	MPC · JPL
830231	2007 VJ_{360}	—	August 31, 2017	Haleakala	Pan-STARRS 1	EOS	1.0 km	MPC · JPL
830232	2007 VN_{361}	—	April 10, 2010	Kitt Peak	Spacewatch	·	2.3 km	MPC · JPL
830233	2007 VO_{361}	—	November 15, 2007	Mount Lemmon	Mount Lemmon Survey	LIX	2.5 km	MPC · JPL
830234	2007 VF_{362}	—	July 25, 2017	Haleakala	Pan-STARRS 1	H	500 m	MPC · JPL
830235	2007 VJ_{362}	—	May 16, 2010	Mount Lemmon	Mount Lemmon Survey	·	2.6 km	MPC · JPL
830236	2007 VY_{366}	—	October 15, 2007	Mount Lemmon	Mount Lemmon Survey	·	440 m	MPC · JPL
830237	2007 VC_{367}	—	November 11, 2007	Mount Lemmon	Mount Lemmon Survey	·	1.6 km	MPC · JPL
830238	2007 VU_{367}	—	November 13, 2007	Mount Lemmon	Mount Lemmon Survey	AGN	970 m	MPC · JPL
830239	2007 VW_{367}	—	November 13, 2007	Mount Lemmon	Mount Lemmon Survey	·	1.8 km	MPC · JPL
830240	2007 VX_{371}	—	November 3, 2007	Kitt Peak	Spacewatch	·	1.4 km	MPC · JPL
830241	2007 VK_{372}	—	November 4, 2007	Kitt Peak	Spacewatch	·	410 m	MPC · JPL
830242	2007 VR_{374}	—	November 4, 2007	Kitt Peak	Spacewatch	·	2.9 km	MPC · JPL
830243	2007 VF_{375}	—	November 9, 2007	Kitt Peak	Spacewatch	·	2.6 km	MPC · JPL
830244	2007 VK_{377}	—	November 9, 2007	Catalina	CSS	·	1.6 km	MPC · JPL
830245	2007 VP_{379}	—	November 4, 2007	Kitt Peak	Spacewatch	KOR	1.0 km	MPC · JPL
830246	2007 VE_{380}	—	November 3, 2007	Kitt Peak	Spacewatch	·	1.1 km	MPC · JPL
830247	2007 VT_{381}	—	November 2, 2007	Kitt Peak	Spacewatch	VER	1.9 km	MPC · JPL
830248	2007 VC_{382}	—	November 12, 2007	Mount Lemmon	Mount Lemmon Survey	·	1.6 km	MPC · JPL
830249	2007 WD_{2}	—	October 21, 2007	Mount Lemmon	Mount Lemmon Survey	·	1.0 km	MPC · JPL
830250	2007 WW_{5}	—	September 14, 2007	Mount Lemmon	Mount Lemmon Survey	·	1.7 km	MPC · JPL
830251	2007 WU_{15}	—	November 9, 2007	Kitt Peak	Spacewatch	·	840 m	MPC · JPL
830252	2007 WD_{29}	—	November 2, 2007	Kitt Peak	Spacewatch	HNS	900 m	MPC · JPL
830253	2007 WZ_{29}	—	November 19, 2007	Kitt Peak	Spacewatch	·	1.6 km	MPC · JPL
830254	2007 WU_{32}	—	November 19, 2007	Mount Lemmon	Mount Lemmon Survey	·	430 m	MPC · JPL
830255	2007 WS_{37}	—	November 8, 2007	Kitt Peak	Spacewatch	·	810 m	MPC · JPL
830256	2007 WK_{41}	—	November 2, 2007	Mount Lemmon	Mount Lemmon Survey	·	2.1 km	MPC · JPL
830257	2007 WR_{49}	—	November 8, 2007	Kitt Peak	Spacewatch	·	1.6 km	MPC · JPL
830258	2007 WX_{50}	—	November 4, 2007	Kitt Peak	Spacewatch	·	800 m	MPC · JPL
830259	2007 WT_{54}	—	November 3, 2007	Mount Lemmon	Mount Lemmon Survey	·	2.3 km	MPC · JPL
830260	2007 WN_{56}	—	October 21, 2007	Mount Lemmon	Mount Lemmon Survey	·	1.4 km	MPC · JPL
830261	2007 WQ_{67}	—	June 20, 2013	Haleakala	Pan-STARRS 1	·	500 m	MPC · JPL
830262	2007 WY_{67}	—	October 24, 2011	Haleakala	Pan-STARRS 1	·	1.3 km	MPC · JPL
830263	2007 WD_{68}	—	November 20, 2007	Mount Lemmon	Mount Lemmon Survey	EOS	1.5 km	MPC · JPL
830264	2007 WQ_{69}	—	July 25, 2014	Haleakala	Pan-STARRS 1	·	820 m	MPC · JPL
830265	2007 WP_{72}	—	November 18, 2007	Kitt Peak	Spacewatch	·	460 m	MPC · JPL
830266	2007 WY_{72}	—	November 18, 2007	Mount Lemmon	Mount Lemmon Survey	·	1.5 km	MPC · JPL
830267	2007 WN_{74}	—	November 16, 2007	Mount Lemmon	Mount Lemmon Survey	·	840 m	MPC · JPL
830268	2007 XY_{14}	—	November 8, 2007	Mount Lemmon	Mount Lemmon Survey	·	920 m	MPC · JPL
830269	2007 XM_{25}	—	December 13, 2007	Lulin	LUSS	·	930 m	MPC · JPL
830270	2007 XV_{40}	—	December 6, 2007	Mount Lemmon	Mount Lemmon Survey	·	1.6 km	MPC · JPL
830271	2007 XQ_{42}	—	November 3, 2007	Kitt Peak	Spacewatch	·	1.6 km	MPC · JPL
830272	2007 XK_{51}	—	December 4, 2007	Mount Lemmon	Mount Lemmon Survey	MRX	750 m	MPC · JPL
830273	2007 XE_{57}	—	December 4, 2007	Mount Lemmon	Mount Lemmon Survey	·	1.3 km	MPC · JPL
830274	2007 XU_{62}	—	September 8, 2011	Haleakala	Pan-STARRS 1	GEF	990 m	MPC · JPL
830275	2007 XV_{62}	—	January 10, 2013	Haleakala	Pan-STARRS 1	GEF	940 m	MPC · JPL
830276	2007 XY_{62}	—	December 4, 2007	Kitt Peak	Spacewatch	·	580 m	MPC · JPL
830277	2007 XF_{63}	—	March 1, 2010	WISE	WISE	T_{j} (2.97) · EUP	3.4 km	MPC · JPL
830278	2007 XG_{64}	—	December 3, 2007	Kitt Peak	Spacewatch	·	1.4 km	MPC · JPL
830279	2007 XK_{65}	—	December 4, 2007	Kitt Peak	Spacewatch	MAS	590 m	MPC · JPL
830280	2007 XH_{66}	—	October 21, 2007	Mount Lemmon	Mount Lemmon Survey	·	3.0 km	MPC · JPL
830281	2007 XM_{67}	—	September 1, 2011	Bergisch Gladbach	W. Bickel	AGN	910 m	MPC · JPL
830282	2007 XK_{68}	—	December 5, 2007	Kitt Peak	Spacewatch	·	3.3 km	MPC · JPL
830283	2007 XZ_{68}	—	December 5, 2007	Kitt Peak	Spacewatch	·	1.7 km	MPC · JPL
830284	2007 XG_{70}	—	December 4, 2007	Mount Lemmon	Mount Lemmon Survey	·	1.5 km	MPC · JPL
830285	2007 XY_{70}	—	December 4, 2007	Mount Lemmon	Mount Lemmon Survey	·	550 m	MPC · JPL
830286	2007 YF_{3}	—	December 17, 2007	Eskridge	G. Hug	·	2.3 km	MPC · JPL
830287	2007 YJ_{15}	—	December 16, 2007	Kitt Peak	Spacewatch	·	680 m	MPC · JPL
830288	2007 YK_{25}	—	November 11, 2007	Mount Lemmon	Mount Lemmon Survey	·	980 m	MPC · JPL
830289	2007 YF_{59}	—	December 31, 2007	Kitt Peak	Spacewatch	·	1.7 km	MPC · JPL
830290	2007 YG_{61}	—	October 29, 2002	Sacramento Peak	SDSS	·	1.6 km	MPC · JPL
830291	2007 YP_{64}	—	December 18, 2007	Mount Lemmon	Mount Lemmon Survey	·	2.4 km	MPC · JPL
830292	2007 YP_{66}	—	December 30, 2007	Mount Lemmon	Mount Lemmon Survey	AEO	900 m	MPC · JPL
830293	2007 YM_{75}	—	June 13, 2005	Kitt Peak	Spacewatch	·	1.6 km	MPC · JPL
830294	2007 YP_{76}	—	December 18, 2007	Mount Lemmon	Mount Lemmon Survey	·	1.4 km	MPC · JPL
830295	2007 YO_{81}	—	February 24, 2012	Mount Lemmon	Mount Lemmon Survey	·	760 m	MPC · JPL
830296	2007 YO_{84}	—	December 8, 2012	Mount Lemmon	Mount Lemmon Survey	·	1.2 km	MPC · JPL
830297	2007 YU_{84}	—	October 27, 2017	Haleakala	Pan-STARRS 1	·	490 m	MPC · JPL
830298	2007 YH_{87}	—	December 31, 2007	Mount Lemmon	Mount Lemmon Survey	EUN	780 m	MPC · JPL
830299	2007 YG_{88}	—	December 12, 2015	Haleakala	Pan-STARRS 1	·	760 m	MPC · JPL
830300	2007 YH_{90}	—	December 30, 2007	Kitt Peak	Spacewatch	·	3.4 km	MPC · JPL

== 830301–830400 ==
back to top

Designation			Discovery			Properties		Ref
Permanent	Provisional	Named after	Date	Site	Discoverer(s)	Category	Diam.	Ref
830301	2007 YV_{91}	—	December 16, 2007	Mount Lemmon	Mount Lemmon Survey	·	940 m	MPC · JPL
830302	2007 YF_{92}	—	December 18, 2007	Mount Lemmon	Mount Lemmon Survey	MRX	810 m	MPC · JPL
830303	2007 YS_{92}	—	December 17, 2007	Kitt Peak	Spacewatch	·	470 m	MPC · JPL
830304	2007 YU_{92}	—	December 31, 2007	Kitt Peak	Spacewatch	·	1.7 km	MPC · JPL
830305	2007 YT_{95}	—	December 18, 2007	Mount Lemmon	Mount Lemmon Survey	·	2.4 km	MPC · JPL
830306	2008 AX	—	December 3, 2007	Kitt Peak	Spacewatch	·	1.2 km	MPC · JPL
830307	2008 AP_{5}	—	November 20, 2007	Mount Lemmon	Mount Lemmon Survey	H	490 m	MPC · JPL
830308	2008 AU_{7}	—	December 30, 2007	Kitt Peak	Spacewatch	·	880 m	MPC · JPL
830309	2008 AG_{10}	—	January 10, 2008	Mount Lemmon	Mount Lemmon Survey	·	1.2 km	MPC · JPL
830310	2008 AD_{23}	—	January 10, 2008	Mount Lemmon	Mount Lemmon Survey	·	1.0 km	MPC · JPL
830311	2008 AU_{24}	—	January 10, 2008	Mount Lemmon	Mount Lemmon Survey	·	1.4 km	MPC · JPL
830312	2008 AC_{39}	—	January 10, 2008	Kitt Peak	Spacewatch	·	870 m	MPC · JPL
830313	2008 AO_{52}	—	December 30, 2007	Kitt Peak	Spacewatch	·	430 m	MPC · JPL
830314	2008 AG_{56}	—	September 28, 2003	Kitt Peak	Spacewatch	NYS	620 m	MPC · JPL
830315	2008 AK_{62}	—	January 11, 2008	Mount Lemmon	Mount Lemmon Survey	·	1.1 km	MPC · JPL
830316	2008 AO_{67}	—	December 30, 2007	Kitt Peak	Spacewatch	·	650 m	MPC · JPL
830317	2008 AZ_{70}	—	January 12, 2008	Kitt Peak	Spacewatch	·	1.6 km	MPC · JPL
830318	2008 AU_{75}	—	September 26, 2000	Sacramento Peak	SDSS	EOS	1.6 km	MPC · JPL
830319	2008 AZ_{82}	—	December 31, 2007	Kitt Peak	Spacewatch	NYS	770 m	MPC · JPL
830320	2008 AM_{91}	—	December 31, 2007	Kitt Peak	Spacewatch	NYS	800 m	MPC · JPL
830321	2008 AG_{93}	—	January 14, 2008	Kitt Peak	Spacewatch	·	620 m	MPC · JPL
830322	2008 AV_{102}	—	January 14, 2008	Kitt Peak	Spacewatch	·	740 m	MPC · JPL
830323	2008 AR_{112}	—	January 12, 2008	Kitt Peak	Spacewatch	·	900 m	MPC · JPL
830324	2008 AY_{130}	—	January 6, 2008	Mauna Kea	P. A. Wiegert, A. M. Gilbert	·	680 m	MPC · JPL
830325	2008 AG_{139}	—	January 1, 2008	Mount Lemmon	Mount Lemmon Survey	(895)	3.0 km	MPC · JPL
830326	2008 AZ_{141}	—	November 12, 2012	Haleakala	Pan-STARRS 1	EOS	1.2 km	MPC · JPL
830327	2008 AJ_{147}	—	March 11, 2013	Palomar	Palomar Transient Factory	DOR	1.5 km	MPC · JPL
830328	2008 AL_{147}	—	November 1, 2015	Mount Lemmon	Mount Lemmon Survey	·	1.5 km	MPC · JPL
830329	2008 AB_{148}	—	April 10, 2010	Mount Lemmon	Mount Lemmon Survey	·	3.2 km	MPC · JPL
830330	2008 AF_{150}	—	January 13, 2008	Kitt Peak	Spacewatch	·	2.0 km	MPC · JPL
830331	2008 AX_{150}	—	July 5, 2019	Haleakala	Pan-STARRS 2	·	1.5 km	MPC · JPL
830332	2008 AA_{152}	—	January 10, 2008	Kitt Peak	Spacewatch	·	760 m	MPC · JPL
830333	2008 AU_{155}	—	January 11, 2008	Kitt Peak	Spacewatch	·	1.5 km	MPC · JPL
830334	2008 AA_{156}	—	January 13, 2008	Mount Lemmon	Mount Lemmon Survey	·	700 m	MPC · JPL
830335	2008 AM_{157}	—	January 11, 2008	Kitt Peak	Spacewatch	·	1.1 km	MPC · JPL
830336	2008 AH_{159}	—	January 13, 2008	Kitt Peak	Spacewatch	KON	1.5 km	MPC · JPL
830337	2008 BZ_{27}	—	December 30, 2007	Kitt Peak	Spacewatch	·	900 m	MPC · JPL
830338	2008 BE_{28}	—	January 13, 2008	Kitt Peak	Spacewatch	THB	3.1 km	MPC · JPL
830339	2008 BN_{29}	—	January 11, 2008	Kitt Peak	Spacewatch	·	770 m	MPC · JPL
830340	2008 BY_{45}	—	January 20, 2008	Mount Lemmon	Mount Lemmon Survey	·	1.4 km	MPC · JPL
830341	2008 BV_{50}	—	January 30, 2008	Mount Lemmon	Mount Lemmon Survey	THM	1.7 km	MPC · JPL
830342	2008 BH_{56}	—	June 8, 2016	Haleakala	Pan-STARRS 1	·	2.2 km	MPC · JPL
830343	2008 BY_{58}	—	January 16, 2008	Kitt Peak	Spacewatch	·	1.3 km	MPC · JPL
830344	2008 CG_{9}	—	February 2, 2008	Mount Lemmon	Mount Lemmon Survey	(2076)	530 m	MPC · JPL
830345	2008 CT_{21}	—	February 8, 2008	Gaisberg	Gierlinger, R.	·	590 m	MPC · JPL
830346	2008 CY_{22}	—	February 8, 2008	Mount Lemmon	Mount Lemmon Survey	H	320 m	MPC · JPL
830347	2008 CE_{34}	—	February 2, 2008	Kitt Peak	Spacewatch	·	820 m	MPC · JPL
830348	2008 CU_{50}	—	January 10, 2008	Mount Lemmon	Mount Lemmon Survey	·	920 m	MPC · JPL
830349	2008 CU_{55}	—	February 7, 2008	Kitt Peak	Spacewatch	NYS	880 m	MPC · JPL
830350	2008 CT_{60}	—	February 7, 2008	Mount Lemmon	Mount Lemmon Survey	·	850 m	MPC · JPL
830351	2008 CQ_{69}	—	February 8, 2008	Gaisberg	Gierlinger, R.	·	480 m	MPC · JPL
830352	2008 CP_{79}	—	February 7, 2008	Kitt Peak	Spacewatch	·	1.4 km	MPC · JPL
830353	2008 CD_{88}	—	February 7, 2008	Mount Lemmon	Mount Lemmon Survey	·	1.4 km	MPC · JPL
830354	2008 CB_{96}	—	February 9, 2008	Kitt Peak	Spacewatch	·	1.4 km	MPC · JPL
830355	2008 CR_{110}	—	February 10, 2008	Kitt Peak	Spacewatch	·	2.1 km	MPC · JPL
830356	2008 CB_{113}	—	February 10, 2008	Kitt Peak	Spacewatch	·	850 m	MPC · JPL
830357	2008 CH_{113}	—	February 10, 2008	Kitt Peak	Spacewatch	·	490 m	MPC · JPL
830358	2008 CL_{125}	—	February 8, 2008	Kitt Peak	Spacewatch	GEF	960 m	MPC · JPL
830359	2008 CT_{140}	—	February 8, 2008	Mount Lemmon	Mount Lemmon Survey	·	1.4 km	MPC · JPL
830360	2008 CE_{143}	—	February 8, 2008	Kitt Peak	Spacewatch	·	1.2 km	MPC · JPL
830361	2008 CS_{155}	—	February 9, 2008	Mount Lemmon	Mount Lemmon Survey	DOR	1.7 km	MPC · JPL
830362	2008 CM_{171}	—	February 12, 2008	Mount Lemmon	Mount Lemmon Survey	·	1.6 km	MPC · JPL
830363	2008 CJ_{191}	—	February 2, 2008	Mount Lemmon	Mount Lemmon Survey	·	1.6 km	MPC · JPL
830364	2008 CD_{203}	—	February 10, 2008	Kitt Peak	Spacewatch	·	880 m	MPC · JPL
830365	2008 CY_{208}	—	February 8, 2008	Catalina	CSS	H	440 m	MPC · JPL
830366	2008 CX_{218}	—	March 20, 1999	Sacramento Peak	SDSS	MRX	740 m	MPC · JPL
830367	2008 CJ_{219}	—	September 27, 2003	Kitt Peak	Spacewatch	·	380 m	MPC · JPL
830368	2008 CL_{219}	—	February 2, 2008	Mount Lemmon	Mount Lemmon Survey	·	870 m	MPC · JPL
830369	2008 CJ_{223}	—	February 10, 2008	Mount Lemmon	Mount Lemmon Survey	·	650 m	MPC · JPL
830370	2008 CN_{224}	—	February 12, 2008	Mount Lemmon	Mount Lemmon Survey	·	1.2 km	MPC · JPL
830371	2008 CU_{224}	—	July 2, 2013	Haleakala	Pan-STARRS 1	·	830 m	MPC · JPL
830372	2008 CD_{225}	—	October 7, 2013	Kitt Peak	Spacewatch	·	520 m	MPC · JPL
830373	2008 CU_{226}	—	January 13, 2008	Kitt Peak	Spacewatch	AEO	890 m	MPC · JPL
830374	2008 CY_{227}	—	February 12, 2008	Mount Lemmon	Mount Lemmon Survey	·	500 m	MPC · JPL
830375	2008 CD_{229}	—	October 2, 2016	Haleakala	Pan-STARRS 1	·	540 m	MPC · JPL
830376	2008 CA_{231}	—	February 3, 2012	Haleakala	Pan-STARRS 1	·	790 m	MPC · JPL
830377	2008 CN_{231}	—	February 9, 2008	Mount Lemmon	Mount Lemmon Survey	DOR	1.5 km	MPC · JPL
830378	2008 CG_{233}	—	December 14, 2015	Haleakala	Pan-STARRS 1	·	810 m	MPC · JPL
830379	2008 CA_{234}	—	February 8, 2008	Mount Lemmon	Mount Lemmon Survey	·	1.8 km	MPC · JPL
830380	2008 CP_{235}	—	June 8, 2010	WISE	WISE	·	2.6 km	MPC · JPL
830381	2008 CL_{237}	—	February 11, 2008	Mount Lemmon	Mount Lemmon Survey	EUN	710 m	MPC · JPL
830382	2008 CY_{238}	—	August 25, 2000	Cerro Tololo	Deep Ecliptic Survey	·	2.2 km	MPC · JPL
830383	2008 CH_{241}	—	February 12, 2008	Mount Lemmon	Mount Lemmon Survey	·	2.2 km	MPC · JPL
830384	2008 CW_{241}	—	February 14, 2008	Mount Lemmon	Mount Lemmon Survey	HOF	2.0 km	MPC · JPL
830385	2008 CH_{246}	—	February 8, 2008	Kitt Peak	Spacewatch	·	1.3 km	MPC · JPL
830386	2008 DZ_{22}	—	February 28, 2008	Mount Lemmon	Mount Lemmon Survey	·	1.2 km	MPC · JPL
830387	2008 DQ_{25}	—	February 29, 2008	XuYi	PMO NEO Survey Program	·	730 m	MPC · JPL
830388	2008 DX_{43}	—	February 10, 2008	Kitt Peak	Spacewatch	·	530 m	MPC · JPL
830389	2008 DJ_{47}	—	February 28, 2008	Kitt Peak	Spacewatch	·	560 m	MPC · JPL
830390	2008 DR_{62}	—	February 28, 2008	Mount Lemmon	Mount Lemmon Survey	·	550 m	MPC · JPL
830391	2008 DR_{63}	—	February 28, 2008	Mount Lemmon	Mount Lemmon Survey	·	1.9 km	MPC · JPL
830392	2008 DH_{65}	—	January 8, 2002	Sacramento Peak	SDSS	·	1.3 km	MPC · JPL
830393	2008 DF_{72}	—	February 26, 2008	Mount Lemmon	Mount Lemmon Survey	PHO	730 m	MPC · JPL
830394	2008 DZ_{92}	—	September 15, 2009	Kitt Peak	Spacewatch	·	780 m	MPC · JPL
830395	2008 DO_{93}	—	February 28, 2008	Kitt Peak	Spacewatch	·	1.3 km	MPC · JPL
830396	2008 DN_{94}	—	November 1, 2015	Mount Lemmon	Mount Lemmon Survey	WIT	780 m	MPC · JPL
830397	2008 DU_{94}	—	April 27, 2012	Haleakala	Pan-STARRS 1	MAS	480 m	MPC · JPL
830398	2008 DF_{95}	—	May 4, 2014	Haleakala	Pan-STARRS 1	·	1.3 km	MPC · JPL
830399	2008 DL_{96}	—	February 26, 2008	Mount Lemmon	Mount Lemmon Survey	·	770 m	MPC · JPL
830400	2008 DQ_{97}	—	February 28, 2008	Kitt Peak	Spacewatch	·	1.4 km	MPC · JPL

== 830401–830500 ==
back to top

Designation			Discovery			Properties		Ref
Permanent	Provisional	Named after	Date	Site	Discoverer(s)	Category	Diam.	Ref
830401	2008 DR_{98}	—	February 28, 2008	Mount Lemmon	Mount Lemmon Survey	·	920 m	MPC · JPL
830402	2008 DK_{99}	—	February 28, 2008	Mount Lemmon	Mount Lemmon Survey	·	1.7 km	MPC · JPL
830403	2008 DJ_{100}	—	February 28, 2008	Kitt Peak	Spacewatch	EOS	1.3 km	MPC · JPL
830404	2008 EN_{1}	—	March 1, 2008	Mount Lemmon	Mount Lemmon Survey	·	2.2 km	MPC · JPL
830405	2008 EB_{3}	—	March 1, 2008	Mount Lemmon	Mount Lemmon Survey	·	480 m	MPC · JPL
830406	2008 EO_{6}	—	March 5, 2008	Socorro	LINEAR	AMO	440 m	MPC · JPL
830407	2008 EJ_{12}	—	February 10, 2008	Kitt Peak	Spacewatch	·	1.9 km	MPC · JPL
830408	2008 EL_{12}	—	March 1, 2008	Kitt Peak	Spacewatch	·	1.4 km	MPC · JPL
830409	2008 EN_{18}	—	March 1, 2008	Mount Lemmon	Mount Lemmon Survey	·	1.6 km	MPC · JPL
830410	2008 EG_{39}	—	March 4, 2008	Kitt Peak	Spacewatch	·	530 m	MPC · JPL
830411	2008 EF_{81}	—	March 10, 2008	Kitt Peak	Spacewatch	·	750 m	MPC · JPL
830412	2008 EV_{107}	—	November 19, 2003	Kitt Peak	Spacewatch	MAS	550 m	MPC · JPL
830413	2008 EV_{127}	—	March 11, 2008	Kitt Peak	Spacewatch	·	730 m	MPC · JPL
830414	2008 EE_{140}	—	March 12, 2008	Kitt Peak	Spacewatch	·	1.7 km	MPC · JPL
830415	2008 ED_{175}	—	August 19, 2009	Catalina	CSS	H	430 m	MPC · JPL
830416	2008 EQ_{176}	—	March 12, 2008	Kitt Peak	Spacewatch	·	780 m	MPC · JPL
830417	2008 ER_{178}	—	March 1, 2008	Kitt Peak	Spacewatch	·	820 m	MPC · JPL
830418	2008 EV_{178}	—	January 29, 2011	Kitt Peak	Spacewatch	·	490 m	MPC · JPL
830419	2008 EZ_{183}	—	March 2, 2008	Mount Lemmon	Mount Lemmon Survey	·	560 m	MPC · JPL
830420	2008 EK_{185}	—	March 5, 2008	Mount Lemmon	Mount Lemmon Survey	·	1.5 km	MPC · JPL
830421	2008 ES_{185}	—	August 12, 2016	Haleakala	Pan-STARRS 1	·	590 m	MPC · JPL
830422	2008 EU_{189}	—	March 1, 2008	Kitt Peak	Spacewatch	·	930 m	MPC · JPL
830423	2008 EE_{191}	—	March 13, 2008	Kitt Peak	Spacewatch	·	670 m	MPC · JPL
830424	2008 EP_{192}	—	March 1, 2008	Kitt Peak	Spacewatch	·	1.1 km	MPC · JPL
830425	2008 EQ_{192}	—	March 5, 2008	Kitt Peak	Spacewatch	·	490 m	MPC · JPL
830426	2008 ES_{194}	—	March 12, 2008	Kitt Peak	Spacewatch	·	1.6 km	MPC · JPL
830427	2008 EN_{197}	—	March 8, 2008	Mount Lemmon	Mount Lemmon Survey	·	1.1 km	MPC · JPL
830428	2008 FW	—	February 28, 2008	Kitt Peak	Spacewatch	·	1.3 km	MPC · JPL
830429	2008 FY_{1}	—	March 25, 2008	Kitt Peak	Spacewatch	·	2.5 km	MPC · JPL
830430	2008 FD_{5}	—	March 26, 2008	Mount Lemmon	Mount Lemmon Survey	·	1.6 km	MPC · JPL
830431	2008 FQ_{8}	—	February 27, 2008	Mount Lemmon	Mount Lemmon Survey	MAS	540 m	MPC · JPL
830432	2008 FM_{13}	—	February 28, 2008	Kitt Peak	Spacewatch	PHO	640 m	MPC · JPL
830433	2008 FF_{36}	—	March 28, 2008	Mount Lemmon	Mount Lemmon Survey	·	1.1 km	MPC · JPL
830434	2008 FL_{51}	—	March 12, 2008	Kitt Peak	Spacewatch	MAS	520 m	MPC · JPL
830435	2008 FE_{56}	—	March 15, 2004	Kitt Peak	Spacewatch	·	1.0 km	MPC · JPL
830436	2008 FT_{56}	—	March 28, 2008	Mount Lemmon	Mount Lemmon Survey	·	1.6 km	MPC · JPL
830437	2008 FW_{56}	—	March 28, 2008	Mount Lemmon	Mount Lemmon Survey	·	810 m	MPC · JPL
830438	2008 FT_{62}	—	March 8, 2008	Mount Lemmon	Mount Lemmon Survey	·	1.0 km	MPC · JPL
830439	2008 FV_{70}	—	February 27, 2008	Kitt Peak	Spacewatch	·	1.7 km	MPC · JPL
830440	2008 FA_{73}	—	March 27, 2008	Kitt Peak	Spacewatch	·	1.5 km	MPC · JPL
830441	2008 FR_{84}	—	March 20, 1999	Sacramento Peak	SDSS	AEO	1.0 km	MPC · JPL
830442	2008 FF_{87}	—	March 15, 2008	Mount Lemmon	Mount Lemmon Survey	H	320 m	MPC · JPL
830443	2008 FG_{114}	—	March 31, 2008	Mount Lemmon	Mount Lemmon Survey	·	1.6 km	MPC · JPL
830444	2008 FS_{114}	—	March 31, 2008	Mount Lemmon	Mount Lemmon Survey	·	570 m	MPC · JPL
830445	2008 FD_{121}	—	October 4, 2002	Sacramento Peak	SDSS	·	500 m	MPC · JPL
830446	2008 FV_{121}	—	March 31, 2008	Mount Lemmon	Mount Lemmon Survey	·	1.4 km	MPC · JPL
830447	2008 FS_{126}	—	March 29, 2008	Kitt Peak	Spacewatch	·	1.6 km	MPC · JPL
830448	2008 FF_{142}	—	August 8, 2016	Haleakala	Pan-STARRS 1	·	650 m	MPC · JPL
830449	2008 FG_{143}	—	February 24, 2017	Haleakala	Pan-STARRS 1	·	1.7 km	MPC · JPL
830450	2008 FL_{143}	—	March 29, 2008	Kitt Peak	Spacewatch	·	1.6 km	MPC · JPL
830451	2008 FA_{145}	—	October 26, 2011	Haleakala	Pan-STARRS 1	·	1.3 km	MPC · JPL
830452	2008 FJ_{147}	—	March 31, 2008	Mount Lemmon	Mount Lemmon Survey	·	1.4 km	MPC · JPL
830453	2008 FL_{147}	—	March 28, 2008	Mount Lemmon	Mount Lemmon Survey	·	450 m	MPC · JPL
830454	2008 FJ_{151}	—	March 27, 2008	Mount Lemmon	Mount Lemmon Survey	·	760 m	MPC · JPL
830455	2008 GG_{10}	—	April 1, 2008	Kitt Peak	Spacewatch	·	1.8 km	MPC · JPL
830456	2008 GS_{13}	—	March 11, 2008	Kitt Peak	Spacewatch	·	1.9 km	MPC · JPL
830457	2008 GP_{15}	—	April 3, 2008	Mount Lemmon	Mount Lemmon Survey	·	960 m	MPC · JPL
830458	2008 GJ_{27}	—	April 3, 2008	Kitt Peak	Spacewatch	NYS	700 m	MPC · JPL
830459	2008 GY_{33}	—	March 27, 2008	Mount Lemmon	Mount Lemmon Survey	·	450 m	MPC · JPL
830460	2008 GB_{40}	—	April 4, 2008	Mount Lemmon	Mount Lemmon Survey	·	1.9 km	MPC · JPL
830461	2008 GX_{43}	—	April 4, 2008	Mount Lemmon	Mount Lemmon Survey	·	1.5 km	MPC · JPL
830462	2008 GP_{45}	—	March 30, 2008	Kitt Peak	Spacewatch	·	480 m	MPC · JPL
830463	2008 GU_{46}	—	April 4, 2008	Kitt Peak	Spacewatch	·	1.0 km	MPC · JPL
830464	2008 GB_{58}	—	April 5, 2008	Mount Lemmon	Mount Lemmon Survey	·	1.6 km	MPC · JPL
830465	2008 GK_{59}	—	March 12, 2008	Mount Lemmon	Mount Lemmon Survey	MAS	470 m	MPC · JPL
830466	2008 GL_{59}	—	April 5, 2008	Mount Lemmon	Mount Lemmon Survey	·	1.4 km	MPC · JPL
830467	2008 GY_{62}	—	April 5, 2008	Kitt Peak	Spacewatch	·	560 m	MPC · JPL
830468	2008 GU_{73}	—	March 28, 2008	Kitt Peak	Spacewatch	·	1.2 km	MPC · JPL
830469	2008 GF_{78}	—	April 7, 2008	Kitt Peak	Spacewatch	·	600 m	MPC · JPL
830470	2008 GQ_{99}	—	April 9, 2008	Kitt Peak	Spacewatch	NYS	820 m	MPC · JPL
830471	2008 GA_{106}	—	March 31, 2008	Kitt Peak	Spacewatch	·	1.2 km	MPC · JPL
830472	2008 GR_{106}	—	April 4, 2008	Kitt Peak	Spacewatch	·	510 m	MPC · JPL
830473	2008 GR_{115}	—	March 10, 2008	Kitt Peak	Spacewatch	·	1.9 km	MPC · JPL
830474	2008 GM_{142}	—	April 4, 2008	Catalina	CSS	BAR	1.0 km	MPC · JPL
830475	2008 GA_{149}	—	April 4, 2008	Kitt Peak	Spacewatch	·	680 m	MPC · JPL
830476	2008 GT_{151}	—	November 11, 2001	Sacramento Peak	SDSS	·	1.1 km	MPC · JPL
830477	2008 GS_{155}	—	April 1, 2008	Mount Lemmon	Mount Lemmon Survey	AEO	770 m	MPC · JPL
830478	2008 GT_{156}	—	April 14, 2008	Mount Lemmon	Mount Lemmon Survey	NYS	630 m	MPC · JPL
830479	2008 GD_{161}	—	April 8, 2008	Kitt Peak	Spacewatch	·	500 m	MPC · JPL
830480	2008 GO_{161}	—	April 15, 2008	Kitt Peak	Spacewatch	·	1.9 km	MPC · JPL
830481	2008 GH_{169}	—	April 13, 2008	Mount Lemmon	Mount Lemmon Survey	·	2.0 km	MPC · JPL
830482	2008 GL_{170}	—	April 14, 2008	Mount Lemmon	Mount Lemmon Survey	·	1.5 km	MPC · JPL
830483	2008 GA_{171}	—	April 7, 2008	Kitt Peak	Spacewatch	·	1.9 km	MPC · JPL
830484	2008 GF_{171}	—	April 6, 2008	Mount Lemmon	Mount Lemmon Survey	H	490 m	MPC · JPL
830485	2008 GQ_{172}	—	April 4, 2008	Kitt Peak	Spacewatch	·	480 m	MPC · JPL
830486	2008 GL_{174}	—	April 3, 2008	Mount Lemmon	Mount Lemmon Survey	LIX	2.6 km	MPC · JPL
830487	2008 GN_{175}	—	April 5, 2008	Mount Lemmon	Mount Lemmon Survey	·	860 m	MPC · JPL
830488	2008 GQ_{175}	—	April 1, 2008	Kitt Peak	Spacewatch	·	1.2 km	MPC · JPL
830489	2008 GB_{176}	—	April 14, 2008	Kitt Peak	Spacewatch	·	1.6 km	MPC · JPL
830490	2008 GF_{176}	—	April 5, 2008	Mount Lemmon	Mount Lemmon Survey	·	1.6 km	MPC · JPL
830491	2008 GV_{177}	—	April 15, 2008	Kitt Peak	Spacewatch	·	400 m	MPC · JPL
830492	2008 GJ_{178}	—	April 8, 2008	Mount Lemmon	Mount Lemmon Survey	·	1.6 km	MPC · JPL
830493	2008 GY_{178}	—	April 14, 2008	Mount Lemmon	Mount Lemmon Survey	·	490 m	MPC · JPL
830494	2008 HM_{1}	—	April 24, 2008	Kitt Peak	Spacewatch	·	560 m	MPC · JPL
830495	2008 HX_{19}	—	April 26, 2008	Kitt Peak	Spacewatch	·	2.1 km	MPC · JPL
830496	2008 HE_{20}	—	April 14, 2008	Mount Lemmon	Mount Lemmon Survey	·	2.1 km	MPC · JPL
830497	2008 HW_{30}	—	April 29, 2008	Mount Lemmon	Mount Lemmon Survey	·	1.5 km	MPC · JPL
830498	2008 HF_{46}	—	July 20, 2001	Palomar	NEAT	·	810 m	MPC · JPL
830499	2008 HM_{53}	—	April 14, 2008	Mount Lemmon	Mount Lemmon Survey	·	2.0 km	MPC · JPL
830500	2008 HH_{72}	—	April 29, 2008	Mount Lemmon	Mount Lemmon Survey	·	780 m	MPC · JPL

== 830501–830600 ==
back to top

Designation			Discovery			Properties		Ref
Permanent	Provisional	Named after	Date	Site	Discoverer(s)	Category	Diam.	Ref
830501	2008 HT_{73}	—	January 2, 2012	Mount Lemmon	Mount Lemmon Survey	·	1.7 km	MPC · JPL
830502	2008 HY_{74}	—	December 14, 2010	Mount Lemmon	Mount Lemmon Survey	·	760 m	MPC · JPL
830503	2008 JY_{10}	—	May 3, 2008	Kitt Peak	Spacewatch	·	720 m	MPC · JPL
830504	2008 JG_{12}	—	May 3, 2008	Kitt Peak	Spacewatch	·	1.0 km	MPC · JPL
830505	2008 JM_{17}	—	April 1, 2008	Kitt Peak	Spacewatch	·	1.5 km	MPC · JPL
830506	2008 JQ_{30}	—	May 11, 2008	Kitt Peak	Spacewatch	EOS	1.3 km	MPC · JPL
830507	2008 JR_{30}	—	May 11, 2008	Kitt Peak	Spacewatch	LIX	2.6 km	MPC · JPL
830508	2008 JQ_{33}	—	June 5, 2000	Kitt Peak	Spacewatch	·	960 m	MPC · JPL
830509	2008 JX_{43}	—	July 30, 2010	WISE	WISE	3:2 · SHU	4.5 km	MPC · JPL
830510	2008 JG_{44}	—	May 8, 2008	Mount Lemmon	Mount Lemmon Survey	·	1.2 km	MPC · JPL
830511	2008 JB_{45}	—	January 19, 2012	Haleakala	Pan-STARRS 1	·	1.3 km	MPC · JPL
830512	2008 JX_{47}	—	May 3, 2008	Kitt Peak	Spacewatch	EOS	1.4 km	MPC · JPL
830513	2008 JD_{48}	—	May 5, 2008	Mount Lemmon	Mount Lemmon Survey	·	830 m	MPC · JPL
830514	2008 JN_{49}	—	September 25, 1998	Sacramento Peak	SDSS	LIX	2.6 km	MPC · JPL
830515	2008 JX_{50}	—	May 11, 2008	Mount Lemmon	Mount Lemmon Survey	·	2.0 km	MPC · JPL
830516	2008 JG_{51}	—	May 11, 2008	Kitt Peak	Spacewatch	EOS	1.3 km	MPC · JPL
830517	2008 JV_{52}	—	May 3, 2008	Mount Lemmon	Mount Lemmon Survey	·	2.1 km	MPC · JPL
830518	2008 JB_{53}	—	May 3, 2008	Mount Lemmon	Mount Lemmon Survey	·	1.8 km	MPC · JPL
830519	2008 JX_{53}	—	May 3, 2008	Kitt Peak	Spacewatch	·	710 m	MPC · JPL
830520	2008 KP_{9}	—	May 27, 2008	Kitt Peak	Spacewatch	·	1.4 km	MPC · JPL
830521	2008 KF_{20}	—	May 28, 2008	Mount Lemmon	Mount Lemmon Survey	·	2.1 km	MPC · JPL
830522	2008 KT_{22}	—	May 28, 2008	Mount Lemmon	Mount Lemmon Survey	EOS	1.3 km	MPC · JPL
830523	2008 KY_{23}	—	May 5, 2008	Kitt Peak	Spacewatch	·	790 m	MPC · JPL
830524	2008 KS_{35}	—	May 13, 2008	Mount Lemmon	Mount Lemmon Survey	·	3.1 km	MPC · JPL
830525	2008 KM_{48}	—	May 27, 2008	Mount Lemmon	Mount Lemmon Survey	·	1.8 km	MPC · JPL
830526	2008 KL_{49}	—	May 28, 2008	Mount Lemmon	Mount Lemmon Survey	·	1.0 km	MPC · JPL
830527	2008 KV_{49}	—	May 16, 2008	Kitt Peak	Spacewatch	·	1.8 km	MPC · JPL
830528	2008 LY_{20}	—	August 27, 2014	Haleakala	Pan-STARRS 1	·	1.4 km	MPC · JPL
830529	2008 MZ	—	June 15, 2008	Siding Spring	SSS	AMO	700 m	MPC · JPL
830530	2008 MN_{2}	—	June 30, 2008	Kitt Peak	Spacewatch	EUN	820 m	MPC · JPL
830531	2008 OG_{6}	—	July 25, 2008	Siding Spring	SSS	·	510 m	MPC · JPL
830532	2008 OP_{10}	—	July 28, 2008	Siding Spring	SSS	·	1.1 km	MPC · JPL
830533	2008 OG_{17}	—	July 2, 2008	Kitt Peak	Spacewatch	·	410 m	MPC · JPL
830534	2008 OK_{22}	—	July 30, 2008	Kitt Peak	Spacewatch	EUN	960 m	MPC · JPL
830535	2008 OS_{24}	—	July 28, 2008	Siding Spring	SSS	·	1.6 km	MPC · JPL
830536	2008 OX_{25}	—	July 31, 2008	Mount Lemmon	Mount Lemmon Survey	·	2.6 km	MPC · JPL
830537	2008 OY_{29}	—	October 22, 2012	Mount Lemmon	Mount Lemmon Survey	·	750 m	MPC · JPL
830538	2008 OD_{30}	—	July 29, 2008	Mount Lemmon	Mount Lemmon Survey	·	2.0 km	MPC · JPL
830539	2008 OL_{30}	—	December 23, 2016	Haleakala	Pan-STARRS 1	EUP	2.9 km	MPC · JPL
830540	2008 OP_{30}	—	July 29, 2008	Mount Lemmon	Mount Lemmon Survey	·	2.2 km	MPC · JPL
830541	2008 OV_{32}	—	July 25, 2008	Mount Lemmon	Mount Lemmon Survey	·	910 m	MPC · JPL
830542	2008 OX_{32}	—	July 29, 2008	Kitt Peak	Spacewatch	3:2	4.2 km	MPC · JPL
830543	2008 OB_{33}	—	July 29, 2008	Kitt Peak	Spacewatch	·	850 m	MPC · JPL
830544	2008 PM_{3}	—	August 4, 2008	Hibiscus	Teamo, N., S. F. Hönig	·	1.1 km	MPC · JPL
830545	2008 PQ_{4}	—	August 4, 2008	Siding Spring	SSS	(5)	1.1 km	MPC · JPL
830546	2008 PF_{6}	—	July 30, 2008	Mount Lemmon	Mount Lemmon Survey	·	660 m	MPC · JPL
830547	2008 PC_{9}	—	July 28, 2008	Mount Lemmon	Mount Lemmon Survey	·	1.0 km	MPC · JPL
830548	2008 PV_{11}	—	July 30, 2008	Mount Lemmon	Mount Lemmon Survey	·	740 m	MPC · JPL
830549	2008 PC_{17}	—	July 1, 2008	Kitt Peak	Spacewatch	·	550 m	MPC · JPL
830550	2008 PL_{17}	—	September 16, 2004	Socorro	LINEAR	BAR	1.2 km	MPC · JPL
830551	2008 PK_{23}	—	August 25, 2014	Haleakala	Pan-STARRS 1	VER	2.0 km	MPC · JPL
830552	2008 PR_{24}	—	August 7, 2008	Kitt Peak	Spacewatch	·	990 m	MPC · JPL
830553	2008 QB_{12}	—	August 5, 2008	Siding Spring	SSS	·	1.4 km	MPC · JPL
830554	2008 QM_{13}	—	August 27, 2008	La Sagra	OAM	·	2.0 km	MPC · JPL
830555	2008 QW_{18}	—	July 30, 2008	Kitt Peak	Spacewatch	·	750 m	MPC · JPL
830556	2008 QD_{21}	—	August 26, 2008	Socorro	LINEAR	·	1.8 km	MPC · JPL
830557	2008 QV_{37}	—	August 21, 2008	Kitt Peak	Spacewatch	·	1.9 km	MPC · JPL
830558	2008 QN_{49}	—	August 21, 2008	Kitt Peak	Spacewatch	·	930 m	MPC · JPL
830559	2008 QQ_{50}	—	August 29, 2008	Črni Vrh	Matičič, S.	(22805)	3.0 km	MPC · JPL
830560	2008 QL_{51}	—	August 29, 2008	Parc National des Cévennes	C. Demeautis, J.-M. Lopez	·	910 m	MPC · JPL
830561	2008 RB_{1}	—	August 6, 2008	Siding Spring	SSS	·	3.0 km	MPC · JPL
830562	2008 RL_{3}	—	September 2, 2008	Kitt Peak	Spacewatch	·	940 m	MPC · JPL
830563	2008 RW_{4}	—	November 19, 2004	Catalina	CSS	MIS	1.6 km	MPC · JPL
830564	2008 RA_{5}	—	September 2, 2008	Kitt Peak	Spacewatch	MAS	540 m	MPC · JPL
830565	2008 RB_{5}	—	September 2, 2008	Kitt Peak	Spacewatch	EUN	840 m	MPC · JPL
830566	2008 RD_{6}	—	September 3, 2008	Kitt Peak	Spacewatch	JUN	770 m	MPC · JPL
830567	2008 RS_{13}	—	August 24, 2008	Kitt Peak	Spacewatch	EOS	1.3 km	MPC · JPL
830568	2008 RB_{20}	—	September 4, 2008	Kitt Peak	Spacewatch	·	2.3 km	MPC · JPL
830569	2008 RP_{23}	—	September 5, 2008	Socorro	LINEAR	·	1.3 km	MPC · JPL
830570	2008 RE_{30}	—	September 2, 2008	Kitt Peak	Spacewatch	·	860 m	MPC · JPL
830571	2008 RR_{32}	—	September 2, 2008	Kitt Peak	Spacewatch	·	2.0 km	MPC · JPL
830572	2008 RR_{34}	—	September 2, 2008	Kitt Peak	Spacewatch	·	950 m	MPC · JPL
830573	2008 RJ_{41}	—	September 2, 2008	Kitt Peak	Spacewatch	(1547)	930 m	MPC · JPL
830574	2008 RJ_{42}	—	September 2, 2008	Kitt Peak	Spacewatch	·	1.9 km	MPC · JPL
830575	2008 RR_{50}	—	November 4, 2004	Catalina	CSS	·	1.0 km	MPC · JPL
830576	2008 RL_{52}	—	September 3, 2008	Kitt Peak	Spacewatch	·	430 m	MPC · JPL
830577	2008 RZ_{52}	—	September 3, 2008	Kitt Peak	Spacewatch	·	980 m	MPC · JPL
830578	2008 RB_{53}	—	September 3, 2008	Kitt Peak	Spacewatch	EOS	1.2 km	MPC · JPL
830579	2008 RR_{53}	—	September 3, 2008	Kitt Peak	Spacewatch	T_{j} (2.96)	2.5 km	MPC · JPL
830580	2008 RF_{56}	—	September 3, 2008	Kitt Peak	Spacewatch	·	2.0 km	MPC · JPL
830581	2008 RJ_{57}	—	September 3, 2008	Kitt Peak	Spacewatch	·	1.7 km	MPC · JPL
830582	2008 RU_{59}	—	September 4, 2008	Kitt Peak	Spacewatch	·	880 m	MPC · JPL
830583	2008 RC_{67}	—	September 4, 2008	Kitt Peak	Spacewatch	EUP	2.7 km	MPC · JPL
830584	2008 RX_{67}	—	September 4, 2008	Kitt Peak	Spacewatch	HNS	780 m	MPC · JPL
830585	2008 RW_{70}	—	September 6, 2008	Mount Lemmon	Mount Lemmon Survey	·	1.4 km	MPC · JPL
830586	2008 RO_{76}	—	September 6, 2008	Mount Lemmon	Mount Lemmon Survey	·	880 m	MPC · JPL
830587	2008 RD_{77}	—	September 6, 2008	Mount Lemmon	Mount Lemmon Survey	EUN	970 m	MPC · JPL
830588	2008 RC_{85}	—	September 4, 2008	Kitt Peak	Spacewatch	·	1.2 km	MPC · JPL
830589	2008 RK_{87}	—	September 5, 2008	Kitt Peak	Spacewatch	·	1.1 km	MPC · JPL
830590	2008 RH_{88}	—	October 19, 2003	Kitt Peak	Spacewatch	·	1.6 km	MPC · JPL
830591	2008 RD_{92}	—	September 6, 2008	Kitt Peak	Spacewatch	MAS	530 m	MPC · JPL
830592	2008 RH_{99}	—	September 2, 2008	Kitt Peak	Spacewatch	·	960 m	MPC · JPL
830593	2008 RP_{100}	—	September 4, 2008	Kitt Peak	Spacewatch	·	550 m	MPC · JPL
830594	2008 RK_{104}	—	September 5, 2008	Kitt Peak	Spacewatch	·	2.3 km	MPC · JPL
830595	2008 RM_{110}	—	September 3, 2008	Kitt Peak	Spacewatch	THM	1.9 km	MPC · JPL
830596	2008 RT_{111}	—	September 4, 2008	Kitt Peak	Spacewatch	·	2.1 km	MPC · JPL
830597	2008 RC_{113}	—	September 5, 2008	Kitt Peak	Spacewatch	·	840 m	MPC · JPL
830598	2008 RS_{121}	—	September 2, 2008	Kitt Peak	Spacewatch	·	1.1 km	MPC · JPL
830599	2008 RS_{124}	—	September 6, 2008	Catalina	CSS	·	1.3 km	MPC · JPL
830600	2008 RG_{131}	—	September 9, 2008	Mount Lemmon	Mount Lemmon Survey	·	1.2 km	MPC · JPL

== 830601–830700 ==
back to top

Designation			Discovery			Properties		Ref
Permanent	Provisional	Named after	Date	Site	Discoverer(s)	Category	Diam.	Ref
830601	2008 RF_{142}	—	September 6, 2008	Kitt Peak	Spacewatch	·	810 m	MPC · JPL
830602	2008 RM_{145}	—	March 12, 2005	Kitt Peak	Spacewatch	·	3.2 km	MPC · JPL
830603	2008 RX_{148}	—	September 4, 2008	Kitt Peak	Spacewatch	·	460 m	MPC · JPL
830604	2008 RQ_{150}	—	September 6, 2008	Mount Lemmon	Mount Lemmon Survey	·	1.1 km	MPC · JPL
830605	2008 RL_{152}	—	September 9, 2008	Kitt Peak	Spacewatch	·	880 m	MPC · JPL
830606	2008 RU_{152}	—	September 7, 2008	Mount Lemmon	Mount Lemmon Survey	·	790 m	MPC · JPL
830607	2008 RA_{153}	—	September 7, 2008	Mount Lemmon	Mount Lemmon Survey	H	380 m	MPC · JPL
830608	2008 RC_{153}	—	September 5, 2008	Kitt Peak	Spacewatch	·	2.1 km	MPC · JPL
830609	2008 RQ_{153}	—	January 9, 2014	Mount Lemmon	Mount Lemmon Survey	(5)	1.1 km	MPC · JPL
830610	2008 RT_{154}	—	September 4, 2008	Kitt Peak	Spacewatch	·	2.1 km	MPC · JPL
830611	2008 RQ_{155}	—	September 7, 2008	Mount Lemmon	Mount Lemmon Survey	ADE	1.2 km	MPC · JPL
830612	2008 RP_{156}	—	September 6, 2008	Mount Lemmon	Mount Lemmon Survey	·	830 m	MPC · JPL
830613	2008 RD_{157}	—	September 4, 2008	Kitt Peak	Spacewatch	·	1.9 km	MPC · JPL
830614	2008 RJ_{158}	—	September 6, 2008	Mount Lemmon	Mount Lemmon Survey	·	730 m	MPC · JPL
830615	2008 RO_{158}	—	September 2, 2008	Kitt Peak	Spacewatch	·	2.1 km	MPC · JPL
830616	2008 RY_{160}	—	September 7, 2008	Mount Lemmon	Mount Lemmon Survey	EUN	760 m	MPC · JPL
830617	2008 RZ_{160}	—	September 6, 2008	Mount Lemmon	Mount Lemmon Survey	·	930 m	MPC · JPL
830618	2008 RN_{170}	—	September 2, 2008	La Sagra	OAM	·	1.6 km	MPC · JPL
830619	2008 RB_{171}	—	September 5, 2008	Kitt Peak	Spacewatch	·	1.0 km	MPC · JPL
830620	2008 RE_{173}	—	September 7, 2008	Mount Lemmon	Mount Lemmon Survey	·	920 m	MPC · JPL
830621	2008 RH_{174}	—	September 9, 2008	Mount Lemmon	Mount Lemmon Survey	·	1.1 km	MPC · JPL
830622	2008 RC_{175}	—	September 6, 2008	Mount Lemmon	Mount Lemmon Survey	·	2.6 km	MPC · JPL
830623	2008 RS_{175}	—	September 3, 2008	Kitt Peak	Spacewatch	EUN	770 m	MPC · JPL
830624	2008 RK_{177}	—	September 5, 2008	Kitt Peak	Spacewatch	·	1.0 km	MPC · JPL
830625	2008 RK_{179}	—	September 9, 2008	Kitt Peak	Spacewatch	·	1.1 km	MPC · JPL
830626	2008 RR_{179}	—	September 3, 2008	Kitt Peak	Spacewatch	·	500 m	MPC · JPL
830627	2008 RO_{180}	—	September 6, 2008	Mount Lemmon	Mount Lemmon Survey	·	1 km	MPC · JPL
830628	2008 RF_{182}	—	September 3, 2008	Kitt Peak	Spacewatch	(5)	780 m	MPC · JPL
830629	2008 RO_{182}	—	September 6, 2008	Mount Lemmon	Mount Lemmon Survey	·	1.1 km	MPC · JPL
830630	2008 RD_{183}	—	September 5, 2008	Kitt Peak	Spacewatch	·	900 m	MPC · JPL
830631	2008 RH_{184}	—	September 6, 2008	Mount Lemmon	Mount Lemmon Survey	3:2	3.6 km	MPC · JPL
830632	2008 RV_{184}	—	September 5, 2008	Kitt Peak	Spacewatch	·	2.4 km	MPC · JPL
830633	2008 RX_{184}	—	September 5, 2008	Kitt Peak	Spacewatch	·	2.8 km	MPC · JPL
830634	2008 SB	—	September 20, 2008	Catalina	CSS	·	1.6 km	MPC · JPL
830635	2008 SC_{4}	—	September 24, 2008	Mount Lemmon	Mount Lemmon Survey	NYS	870 m	MPC · JPL
830636	2008 SU_{15}	—	September 7, 2008	Mount Lemmon	Mount Lemmon Survey	·	820 m	MPC · JPL
830637	2008 SZ_{15}	—	September 4, 2008	Kitt Peak	Spacewatch	·	580 m	MPC · JPL
830638	2008 SJ_{16}	—	September 19, 2008	Kitt Peak	Spacewatch	·	1.3 km	MPC · JPL
830639	2008 SW_{19}	—	August 12, 2008	Črni Vrh	Matičič, S.	THB	2.0 km	MPC · JPL
830640	2008 SN_{21}	—	September 9, 2008	Mount Lemmon	Mount Lemmon Survey	·	880 m	MPC · JPL
830641	2008 SB_{23}	—	September 7, 2008	Mount Lemmon	Mount Lemmon Survey	·	810 m	MPC · JPL
830642	2008 SD_{23}	—	September 7, 2008	Mount Lemmon	Mount Lemmon Survey	·	1.1 km	MPC · JPL
830643	2008 SJ_{23}	—	September 19, 2008	Kitt Peak	Spacewatch	·	810 m	MPC · JPL
830644	2008 SJ_{26}	—	September 19, 2008	Kitt Peak	Spacewatch	·	2.0 km	MPC · JPL
830645	2008 SO_{34}	—	September 20, 2008	Kitt Peak	Spacewatch	·	1.1 km	MPC · JPL
830646	2008 SR_{34}	—	September 6, 2008	Mount Lemmon	Mount Lemmon Survey	URS	2.6 km	MPC · JPL
830647	2008 SB_{35}	—	September 20, 2008	Kitt Peak	Spacewatch	·	1.6 km	MPC · JPL
830648	2008 SG_{43}	—	September 2, 2008	Kitt Peak	Spacewatch	AGN	760 m	MPC · JPL
830649	2008 SV_{46}	—	September 20, 2008	Kitt Peak	Spacewatch	·	980 m	MPC · JPL
830650	2008 SH_{52}	—	September 2, 2008	Kitt Peak	Spacewatch	·	1.1 km	MPC · JPL
830651	2008 SZ_{54}	—	September 20, 2008	Mount Lemmon	Mount Lemmon Survey	·	2.0 km	MPC · JPL
830652	2008 SQ_{55}	—	September 6, 2008	Mount Lemmon	Mount Lemmon Survey	·	1.3 km	MPC · JPL
830653	2008 SU_{60}	—	September 5, 2008	Kitt Peak	Spacewatch	(1547)	1.2 km	MPC · JPL
830654	2008 SR_{62}	—	August 24, 2008	Kitt Peak	Spacewatch	·	920 m	MPC · JPL
830655	2008 ST_{63}	—	August 24, 2008	Kitt Peak	Spacewatch	·	470 m	MPC · JPL
830656	2008 SU_{64}	—	April 21, 2007	Cerro Tololo	Deep Ecliptic Survey	AGN	910 m	MPC · JPL
830657	2008 SO_{71}	—	September 22, 2008	Kitt Peak	Spacewatch	·	900 m	MPC · JPL
830658	2008 SV_{76}	—	September 23, 2008	Mount Lemmon	Mount Lemmon Survey	·	2.7 km	MPC · JPL
830659	2008 SE_{78}	—	September 3, 2008	Kitt Peak	Spacewatch	·	970 m	MPC · JPL
830660	2008 SZ_{80}	—	September 23, 2008	Mount Lemmon	Mount Lemmon Survey	·	1.3 km	MPC · JPL
830661	2008 SU_{90}	—	September 21, 2008	Kitt Peak	Spacewatch	·	450 m	MPC · JPL
830662	2008 SD_{93}	—	September 21, 2008	Kitt Peak	Spacewatch	·	920 m	MPC · JPL
830663	2008 SX_{96}	—	September 21, 2008	Kitt Peak	Spacewatch	EOS	1.2 km	MPC · JPL
830664	2008 SF_{103}	—	September 21, 2008	Mount Lemmon	Mount Lemmon Survey	JUN	720 m	MPC · JPL
830665	2008 SO_{105}	—	September 7, 2008	Mount Lemmon	Mount Lemmon Survey	·	1.4 km	MPC · JPL
830666	2008 SH_{111}	—	September 22, 2008	Kitt Peak	Spacewatch	HNS	950 m	MPC · JPL
830667	2008 SQ_{111}	—	September 22, 2008	Mount Lemmon	Mount Lemmon Survey	·	1.6 km	MPC · JPL
830668	2008 SN_{115}	—	September 22, 2008	Kitt Peak	Spacewatch	·	1.5 km	MPC · JPL
830669	2008 SS_{115}	—	September 22, 2008	Kitt Peak	Spacewatch	·	980 m	MPC · JPL
830670	2008 SZ_{115}	—	September 22, 2008	Kitt Peak	Spacewatch	·	1.1 km	MPC · JPL
830671	2008 SZ_{121}	—	September 22, 2008	Mount Lemmon	Mount Lemmon Survey	L4	6.3 km	MPC · JPL
830672	2008 SK_{131}	—	September 22, 2008	Kitt Peak	Spacewatch	·	390 m	MPC · JPL
830673	2008 SN_{134}	—	September 5, 2008	Kitt Peak	Spacewatch	·	1.8 km	MPC · JPL
830674	2008 SO_{140}	—	September 24, 2008	Mount Lemmon	Mount Lemmon Survey	·	2.4 km	MPC · JPL
830675	2008 SU_{143}	—	September 24, 2008	Mount Lemmon	Mount Lemmon Survey	·	1.3 km	MPC · JPL
830676	2008 SP_{144}	—	September 25, 2008	Mount Lemmon	Mount Lemmon Survey	·	1.0 km	MPC · JPL
830677	2008 SR_{145}	—	August 6, 2008	Siding Spring	SSS	T_{j} (2.96)	2.2 km	MPC · JPL
830678	2008 SZ_{145}	—	September 22, 2008	Catalina	CSS	T_{j} (2.96)	2.0 km	MPC · JPL
830679	2008 SP_{146}	—	September 5, 2008	Kitt Peak	Spacewatch	·	510 m	MPC · JPL
830680	2008 SC_{148}	—	September 20, 2001	Kitt Peak	Spacewatch	·	470 m	MPC · JPL
830681	2008 SY_{153}	—	September 6, 2008	Catalina	CSS	·	990 m	MPC · JPL
830682	2008 ST_{158}	—	August 24, 2008	Kitt Peak	Spacewatch	·	1.6 km	MPC · JPL
830683	2008 SQ_{160}	—	September 20, 2008	Catalina	CSS	·	2.9 km	MPC · JPL
830684	2008 SS_{160}	—	September 3, 2008	Kitt Peak	Spacewatch	·	480 m	MPC · JPL
830685	2008 SZ_{168}	—	September 21, 2008	Mount Lemmon	Mount Lemmon Survey	·	890 m	MPC · JPL
830686	2008 SF_{173}	—	September 22, 2008	Mount Lemmon	Mount Lemmon Survey	·	1.1 km	MPC · JPL
830687	2008 SS_{184}	—	September 24, 2008	Kitt Peak	Spacewatch	·	2.5 km	MPC · JPL
830688	2008 SO_{185}	—	September 24, 2008	Kitt Peak	Spacewatch	H	370 m	MPC · JPL
830689	2008 SC_{195}	—	September 6, 2008	Mount Lemmon	Mount Lemmon Survey	·	480 m	MPC · JPL
830690	2008 SE_{196}	—	September 6, 2008	Mount Lemmon	Mount Lemmon Survey	·	670 m	MPC · JPL
830691	2008 SL_{197}	—	September 25, 2008	Kitt Peak	Spacewatch	EUN	960 m	MPC · JPL
830692	2008 SW_{199}	—	September 26, 2008	Kitt Peak	Spacewatch	·	980 m	MPC · JPL
830693	2008 SF_{201}	—	September 26, 2008	Kitt Peak	Spacewatch	·	1.1 km	MPC · JPL
830694	2008 SK_{209}	—	September 28, 2008	Mount Lemmon	Mount Lemmon Survey	·	3.3 km	MPC · JPL
830695	2008 SH_{212}	—	September 29, 2008	Mount Lemmon	Mount Lemmon Survey	·	2.0 km	MPC · JPL
830696	2008 SA_{217}	—	September 29, 2008	Mount Lemmon	Mount Lemmon Survey	·	1.1 km	MPC · JPL
830697	2008 ST_{223}	—	September 25, 2008	Mount Lemmon	Mount Lemmon Survey	·	530 m	MPC · JPL
830698	2008 SW_{225}	—	September 26, 2008	Kitt Peak	Spacewatch	·	1.2 km	MPC · JPL
830699	2008 ST_{226}	—	September 28, 2008	Charleston	R. Holmes, H. Devore	·	2.4 km	MPC · JPL
830700	2008 SW_{237}	—	September 29, 2008	Catalina	CSS	·	1.5 km	MPC · JPL

== 830701–830800 ==
back to top

Designation			Discovery			Properties		Ref
Permanent	Provisional	Named after	Date	Site	Discoverer(s)	Category	Diam.	Ref
830701	2008 SN_{241}	—	September 29, 2008	Catalina	CSS	·	1.2 km	MPC · JPL
830702	2008 SJ_{245}	—	September 29, 2008	Catalina	CSS	·	970 m	MPC · JPL
830703	2008 SS_{247}	—	September 26, 2008	Kitt Peak	Spacewatch	·	2.4 km	MPC · JPL
830704	2008 SP_{255}	—	September 25, 2008	Kitt Peak	Spacewatch	·	960 m	MPC · JPL
830705	2008 SX_{259}	—	September 23, 2008	Kitt Peak	Spacewatch	·	1.2 km	MPC · JPL
830706	2008 SO_{261}	—	September 23, 2008	Kitt Peak	Spacewatch	·	1.0 km	MPC · JPL
830707	2008 SD_{263}	—	September 24, 2008	Kitt Peak	Spacewatch	·	770 m	MPC · JPL
830708	2008 SR_{267}	—	September 23, 2008	Kitt Peak	Spacewatch	·	1.6 km	MPC · JPL
830709	2008 SN_{272}	—	September 23, 2008	Mount Lemmon	Mount Lemmon Survey	·	1.0 km	MPC · JPL
830710	2008 SE_{277}	—	September 24, 2008	Kitt Peak	Spacewatch	·	1.2 km	MPC · JPL
830711	2008 SR_{277}	—	September 25, 2008	Kitt Peak	Spacewatch	·	1.7 km	MPC · JPL
830712	2008 SB_{287}	—	September 23, 2008	Kitt Peak	Spacewatch	·	620 m	MPC · JPL
830713	2008 SK_{292}	—	September 22, 2008	Catalina	CSS	·	1.2 km	MPC · JPL
830714	2008 SR_{294}	—	September 9, 2008	Catalina	CSS	·	1.1 km	MPC · JPL
830715	2008 ST_{294}	—	August 14, 2002	Kitt Peak	Spacewatch	·	2.4 km	MPC · JPL
830716	2008 SH_{311}	—	September 6, 2008	Kitt Peak	Spacewatch	·	940 m	MPC · JPL
830717	2008 SA_{316}	—	September 28, 2008	Mount Lemmon	Mount Lemmon Survey	WIT	840 m	MPC · JPL
830718	2008 SV_{316}	—	September 23, 2008	Mount Lemmon	Mount Lemmon Survey	·	1.1 km	MPC · JPL
830719	2008 SJ_{317}	—	September 25, 2008	Kitt Peak	Spacewatch	EUN	850 m	MPC · JPL
830720	2008 SA_{318}	—	September 23, 2008	Kitt Peak	Spacewatch	·	1.4 km	MPC · JPL
830721	2008 SE_{318}	—	September 24, 2008	Mount Lemmon	Mount Lemmon Survey	·	1.2 km	MPC · JPL
830722	2008 ST_{318}	—	October 19, 2012	Mount Lemmon	Mount Lemmon Survey	PHO	800 m	MPC · JPL
830723	2008 SD_{319}	—	September 24, 2008	Mount Lemmon	Mount Lemmon Survey	·	1.3 km	MPC · JPL
830724	2008 SV_{321}	—	September 23, 2008	Kitt Peak	Spacewatch	·	930 m	MPC · JPL
830725	2008 SH_{322}	—	May 30, 2016	Haleakala	Pan-STARRS 1	·	1.2 km	MPC · JPL
830726	2008 SJ_{323}	—	September 23, 2008	Catalina	CSS	·	1.2 km	MPC · JPL
830727	2008 SS_{323}	—	September 20, 2008	Mount Lemmon	Mount Lemmon Survey	NYS	760 m	MPC · JPL
830728	2008 SU_{326}	—	September 22, 2008	Catalina	CSS	·	460 m	MPC · JPL
830729	2008 SW_{326}	—	August 9, 2013	Kitt Peak	Spacewatch	·	2.0 km	MPC · JPL
830730	2008 SY_{330}	—	October 13, 2017	Mount Lemmon	Mount Lemmon Survey	·	1.0 km	MPC · JPL
830731	2008 SG_{333}	—	March 13, 2011	Mount Lemmon	Mount Lemmon Survey	·	880 m	MPC · JPL
830732	2008 SL_{334}	—	November 28, 2013	Mount Lemmon	Mount Lemmon Survey	·	1.1 km	MPC · JPL
830733	2008 SU_{335}	—	September 20, 2014	Mount Lemmon	Mount Lemmon Survey	URS	2.3 km	MPC · JPL
830734	2008 SX_{335}	—	September 23, 2008	Kitt Peak	Spacewatch	·	2.2 km	MPC · JPL
830735	2008 SN_{337}	—	March 14, 2016	Mount Lemmon	Mount Lemmon Survey	·	1.9 km	MPC · JPL
830736	2008 ST_{337}	—	September 23, 2008	Kitt Peak	Spacewatch	·	730 m	MPC · JPL
830737	2008 SM_{339}	—	September 23, 2008	Kitt Peak	Spacewatch	·	2.5 km	MPC · JPL
830738	2008 ST_{339}	—	September 23, 2008	Kitt Peak	Spacewatch	·	460 m	MPC · JPL
830739	2008 SE_{341}	—	September 25, 2008	Kitt Peak	Spacewatch	·	650 m	MPC · JPL
830740	2008 SV_{341}	—	September 25, 2008	Kitt Peak	Spacewatch	·	1.1 km	MPC · JPL
830741	2008 SK_{342}	—	September 25, 2008	Kitt Peak	Spacewatch	·	1.0 km	MPC · JPL
830742	2008 SQ_{342}	—	September 25, 2008	Kitt Peak	Spacewatch	·	1.1 km	MPC · JPL
830743	2008 SN_{344}	—	September 25, 2008	Mount Lemmon	Mount Lemmon Survey	·	1.1 km	MPC · JPL
830744	2008 SR_{345}	—	September 23, 2008	Mount Lemmon	Mount Lemmon Survey	·	2.4 km	MPC · JPL
830745	2008 SH_{346}	—	September 29, 2008	Mount Lemmon	Mount Lemmon Survey	·	920 m	MPC · JPL
830746	2008 SJ_{347}	—	September 22, 2008	Mount Lemmon	Mount Lemmon Survey	·	1.8 km	MPC · JPL
830747	2008 SN_{348}	—	September 24, 2008	Mount Lemmon	Mount Lemmon Survey	·	1.4 km	MPC · JPL
830748	2008 SW_{349}	—	September 22, 2008	Kitt Peak	Spacewatch	(883)	510 m	MPC · JPL
830749	2008 SX_{350}	—	September 24, 2008	Mount Lemmon	Mount Lemmon Survey	L4	5.9 km	MPC · JPL
830750	2008 SQ_{351}	—	September 29, 2008	Mount Lemmon	Mount Lemmon Survey	·	1.2 km	MPC · JPL
830751	2008 SM_{352}	—	September 29, 2008	Mount Lemmon	Mount Lemmon Survey	·	890 m	MPC · JPL
830752	2008 SO_{353}	—	September 23, 2008	Kitt Peak	Spacewatch	·	410 m	MPC · JPL
830753	2008 SS_{353}	—	September 26, 2008	Mount Lemmon	Mount Lemmon Survey	ADE	1.2 km	MPC · JPL
830754	2008 SG_{354}	—	September 24, 2008	Kitt Peak	Spacewatch	·	1.1 km	MPC · JPL
830755	2008 SR_{355}	—	September 23, 2008	Kitt Peak	Spacewatch	·	1.0 km	MPC · JPL
830756	2008 SS_{356}	—	September 29, 2008	Mount Lemmon	Mount Lemmon Survey	EOS	1.2 km	MPC · JPL
830757	2008 SU_{358}	—	September 27, 2008	Mount Lemmon	Mount Lemmon Survey	·	1.0 km	MPC · JPL
830758	2008 SO_{362}	—	September 29, 2008	Mount Lemmon	Mount Lemmon Survey	WIT	630 m	MPC · JPL
830759	2008 SR_{365}	—	September 29, 2008	Mount Lemmon	Mount Lemmon Survey	L4	6.4 km	MPC · JPL
830760	2008 TU_{9}	—	October 7, 2008	Socorro	LINEAR	(1547)	1.4 km	MPC · JPL
830761	2008 TC_{10}	—	September 22, 2008	Kitt Peak	Spacewatch	·	440 m	MPC · JPL
830762	2008 TT_{11}	—	October 1, 2008	Mount Lemmon	Mount Lemmon Survey	·	990 m	MPC · JPL
830763	2008 TL_{14}	—	September 21, 2008	Kitt Peak	Spacewatch	·	970 m	MPC · JPL
830764	2008 TM_{19}	—	October 1, 2008	Mount Lemmon	Mount Lemmon Survey	·	880 m	MPC · JPL
830765	2008 TH_{25}	—	October 2, 2008	Mount Lemmon	Mount Lemmon Survey	·	1.0 km	MPC · JPL
830766	2008 TR_{31}	—	September 22, 2008	Mount Lemmon	Mount Lemmon Survey	·	1.2 km	MPC · JPL
830767	2008 TU_{43}	—	November 12, 2001	Kitt Peak	Spacewatch	·	550 m	MPC · JPL
830768	2008 TT_{53}	—	October 2, 2008	Kitt Peak	Spacewatch	HYG	2.0 km	MPC · JPL
830769	2008 TF_{57}	—	October 2, 2008	Kitt Peak	Spacewatch	·	1.1 km	MPC · JPL
830770	2008 TK_{57}	—	May 21, 2004	Kitt Peak	Spacewatch	·	500 m	MPC · JPL
830771	2008 TR_{58}	—	October 2, 2008	Kitt Peak	Spacewatch	·	1.4 km	MPC · JPL
830772	2008 TS_{64}	—	September 6, 2008	Catalina	CSS	·	1.2 km	MPC · JPL
830773	2008 TS_{74}	—	October 2, 2008	Kitt Peak	Spacewatch	·	860 m	MPC · JPL
830774	2008 TV_{74}	—	September 22, 2008	Kitt Peak	Spacewatch	·	1.1 km	MPC · JPL
830775	2008 TE_{104}	—	September 3, 2008	Kitt Peak	Spacewatch	·	1.5 km	MPC · JPL
830776	2008 TN_{109}	—	October 6, 2008	Mount Lemmon	Mount Lemmon Survey	T_{j} (2.95) · 3:2	2.9 km	MPC · JPL
830777	2008 TD_{114}	—	September 23, 2008	Kitt Peak	Spacewatch	L4	7.7 km	MPC · JPL
830778	2008 TO_{119}	—	September 23, 2008	Kitt Peak	Spacewatch	·	1.9 km	MPC · JPL
830779	2008 TY_{123}	—	September 4, 2008	Kitt Peak	Spacewatch	·	1.2 km	MPC · JPL
830780	2008 TD_{125}	—	September 23, 2008	Catalina	CSS	·	1.0 km	MPC · JPL
830781	2008 TQ_{128}	—	September 28, 2008	Mount Lemmon	Mount Lemmon Survey	·	600 m	MPC · JPL
830782	2008 TD_{143}	—	October 9, 2008	Mount Lemmon	Mount Lemmon Survey	·	920 m	MPC · JPL
830783	2008 TE_{149}	—	September 3, 2008	Kitt Peak	Spacewatch	·	2.1 km	MPC · JPL
830784	2008 TR_{153}	—	October 9, 2008	Mount Lemmon	Mount Lemmon Survey	(1547)	820 m	MPC · JPL
830785	2008 TS_{153}	—	October 9, 2008	Mount Lemmon	Mount Lemmon Survey	CLO	1.6 km	MPC · JPL
830786	2008 TM_{156}	—	September 24, 2008	Catalina	CSS	·	760 m	MPC · JPL
830787	2008 TP_{157}	—	September 22, 2008	Catalina	CSS	·	1.4 km	MPC · JPL
830788	2008 TW_{166}	—	October 8, 2008	Mount Lemmon	Mount Lemmon Survey	·	1.2 km	MPC · JPL
830789	2008 TO_{179}	—	October 1, 2008	Catalina	CSS	·	1.1 km	MPC · JPL
830790	2008 TG_{186}	—	October 7, 2008	Mount Lemmon	Mount Lemmon Survey	EUP	2.8 km	MPC · JPL
830791	2008 TU_{192}	—	October 8, 2008	Mount Lemmon	Mount Lemmon Survey	V	510 m	MPC · JPL
830792	2008 TX_{192}	—	October 9, 2008	Kitt Peak	Spacewatch	·	890 m	MPC · JPL
830793	2008 TE_{195}	—	October 8, 2008	Catalina	CSS	·	1.5 km	MPC · JPL
830794	2008 TQ_{195}	—	October 6, 2008	Kitt Peak	Spacewatch	·	600 m	MPC · JPL
830795	2008 TJ_{196}	—	October 9, 2008	Mount Lemmon	Mount Lemmon Survey	·	1.1 km	MPC · JPL
830796	2008 TP_{197}	—	September 24, 2008	Kitt Peak	Spacewatch	·	1.3 km	MPC · JPL
830797	2008 TQ_{197}	—	October 8, 2008	Kitt Peak	Spacewatch	3:2 · SHU	4.2 km	MPC · JPL
830798	2008 TZ_{197}	—	September 16, 2012	Catalina	CSS	(1547)	1.3 km	MPC · JPL
830799	2008 TZ_{199}	—	October 3, 2008	Mount Lemmon	Mount Lemmon Survey	·	660 m	MPC · JPL
830800	2008 TZ_{200}	—	July 19, 2015	Haleakala	Pan-STARRS 2	·	810 m	MPC · JPL

== 830801–830900 ==
back to top

Designation			Discovery			Properties		Ref
Permanent	Provisional	Named after	Date	Site	Discoverer(s)	Category	Diam.	Ref
830801	2008 TD_{202}	—	October 8, 2008	Mount Lemmon	Mount Lemmon Survey	·	1.5 km	MPC · JPL
830802	2008 TV_{202}	—	October 10, 2008	Mount Lemmon	Mount Lemmon Survey	·	1.3 km	MPC · JPL
830803	2008 TL_{203}	—	October 30, 2002	Sacramento Peak	SDSS	·	2.1 km	MPC · JPL
830804	2008 TS_{204}	—	October 9, 2008	Catalina	CSS	LIX	3.7 km	MPC · JPL
830805	2008 TP_{206}	—	June 11, 2015	Haleakala	Pan-STARRS 1	·	820 m	MPC · JPL
830806	2008 TE_{208}	—	October 1, 2008	Mount Lemmon	Mount Lemmon Survey	HNS	880 m	MPC · JPL
830807	2008 TB_{209}	—	October 7, 2008	Mount Lemmon	Mount Lemmon Survey	·	800 m	MPC · JPL
830808	2008 TH_{209}	—	October 6, 2008	Mount Lemmon	Mount Lemmon Survey	·	530 m	MPC · JPL
830809	2008 TT_{210}	—	July 5, 2016	Haleakala	Pan-STARRS 1	·	1.1 km	MPC · JPL
830810	2008 TA_{211}	—	October 10, 2008	Kitt Peak	Spacewatch	·	1.0 km	MPC · JPL
830811	2008 TE_{211}	—	October 10, 2008	Mount Lemmon	Mount Lemmon Survey	·	1.6 km	MPC · JPL
830812	2008 TV_{211}	—	October 9, 2008	Mount Lemmon	Mount Lemmon Survey	·	2.5 km	MPC · JPL
830813	2008 TT_{212}	—	October 8, 2008	Mount Lemmon	Mount Lemmon Survey	·	970 m	MPC · JPL
830814	2008 TA_{213}	—	October 1, 2008	Kitt Peak	Spacewatch	·	1.8 km	MPC · JPL
830815	2008 TV_{213}	—	September 24, 2017	Mount Lemmon	Mount Lemmon Survey	·	1.4 km	MPC · JPL
830816	2008 TU_{214}	—	October 8, 2008	Mount Lemmon	Mount Lemmon Survey	·	1.9 km	MPC · JPL
830817	2008 TM_{216}	—	October 1, 2008	Mount Lemmon	Mount Lemmon Survey	·	910 m	MPC · JPL
830818	2008 TO_{216}	—	October 10, 2008	Mount Lemmon	Mount Lemmon Survey	H	270 m	MPC · JPL
830819	2008 TX_{216}	—	October 6, 2008	Mount Lemmon	Mount Lemmon Survey	·	1.8 km	MPC · JPL
830820	2008 TJ_{217}	—	October 6, 2008	Mount Lemmon	Mount Lemmon Survey	·	1.2 km	MPC · JPL
830821	2008 TM_{217}	—	October 7, 2008	Mount Lemmon	Mount Lemmon Survey	·	1.1 km	MPC · JPL
830822	2008 TT_{219}	—	October 8, 2008	Kitt Peak	Spacewatch	·	1.1 km	MPC · JPL
830823	2008 TY_{219}	—	October 8, 2008	Mount Lemmon	Mount Lemmon Survey	·	1.3 km	MPC · JPL
830824	2008 TG_{220}	—	October 7, 2008	Mount Lemmon	Mount Lemmon Survey	·	1.1 km	MPC · JPL
830825	2008 TH_{221}	—	October 8, 2008	Kitt Peak	Spacewatch	·	540 m	MPC · JPL
830826	2008 TK_{221}	—	October 3, 2008	Kitt Peak	Spacewatch	·	1.1 km	MPC · JPL
830827	2008 TW_{221}	—	October 2, 2008	Mount Lemmon	Mount Lemmon Survey	·	1.2 km	MPC · JPL
830828	2008 TE_{225}	—	October 6, 2008	Mount Lemmon	Mount Lemmon Survey	·	2.9 km	MPC · JPL
830829	2008 TQ_{225}	—	October 8, 2008	Kitt Peak	Spacewatch	·	930 m	MPC · JPL
830830	2008 TW_{227}	—	October 9, 2008	Kitt Peak	Spacewatch	·	1.0 km	MPC · JPL
830831	2008 TL_{228}	—	October 8, 2008	Mount Lemmon	Mount Lemmon Survey	·	530 m	MPC · JPL
830832	2008 TY_{228}	—	October 2, 2008	Kitt Peak	Spacewatch	·	510 m	MPC · JPL
830833	2008 TR_{230}	—	October 1, 2008	Mount Lemmon	Mount Lemmon Survey	·	440 m	MPC · JPL
830834	2008 TU_{230}	—	October 8, 2008	Mount Lemmon	Mount Lemmon Survey	·	1.1 km	MPC · JPL
830835	2008 TX_{231}	—	October 8, 2008	Mount Lemmon	Mount Lemmon Survey	·	980 m	MPC · JPL
830836	2008 TQ_{232}	—	October 1, 2008	Mount Lemmon	Mount Lemmon Survey	·	1.1 km	MPC · JPL
830837	2008 TK_{233}	—	October 10, 2008	Mount Lemmon	Mount Lemmon Survey	·	1.0 km	MPC · JPL
830838	2008 TA_{235}	—	October 6, 2008	Kitt Peak	Spacewatch	·	1.3 km	MPC · JPL
830839	2008 TE_{236}	—	October 8, 2008	Mount Lemmon	Mount Lemmon Survey	EOS	1.3 km	MPC · JPL
830840	2008 TD_{240}	—	October 8, 2008	Mount Lemmon	Mount Lemmon Survey	·	1.5 km	MPC · JPL
830841	2008 TY_{240}	—	October 8, 2008	Mount Lemmon	Mount Lemmon Survey	·	1.1 km	MPC · JPL
830842	2008 UA_{13}	—	September 20, 2008	Mount Lemmon	Mount Lemmon Survey	LIX	2.7 km	MPC · JPL
830843	2008 UQ_{19}	—	October 19, 2008	Kitt Peak	Spacewatch	·	950 m	MPC · JPL
830844	2008 UK_{27}	—	October 20, 2008	Kitt Peak	Spacewatch	·	1.4 km	MPC · JPL
830845	2008 UR_{30}	—	September 22, 2008	Mount Lemmon	Mount Lemmon Survey	·	660 m	MPC · JPL
830846	2008 UA_{35}	—	October 20, 2008	Kitt Peak	Spacewatch	·	1.5 km	MPC · JPL
830847	2008 UX_{35}	—	October 8, 2008	Kitt Peak	Spacewatch	·	930 m	MPC · JPL
830848	2008 UF_{36}	—	October 20, 2008	Mount Lemmon	Mount Lemmon Survey	·	1.5 km	MPC · JPL
830849	2008 UE_{39}	—	October 20, 2008	Kitt Peak	Spacewatch	·	1.2 km	MPC · JPL
830850	2008 UZ_{39}	—	October 20, 2008	Kitt Peak	Spacewatch	HYG	2.0 km	MPC · JPL
830851	2008 UK_{55}	—	September 4, 2008	Kitt Peak	Spacewatch	·	1.3 km	MPC · JPL
830852	2008 UD_{58}	—	October 6, 2008	Kitt Peak	Spacewatch	·	2.5 km	MPC · JPL
830853	2008 UR_{58}	—	October 7, 2008	Kitt Peak	Spacewatch	·	1.0 km	MPC · JPL
830854	2008 UH_{60}	—	October 21, 2008	Kitt Peak	Spacewatch	·	1.3 km	MPC · JPL
830855	2008 UX_{63}	—	October 7, 2008	Mount Lemmon	Mount Lemmon Survey	·	1.1 km	MPC · JPL
830856	2008 UY_{67}	—	October 21, 2008	Mount Lemmon	Mount Lemmon Survey	·	1.2 km	MPC · JPL
830857	2008 UE_{68}	—	October 25, 2001	Sacramento Peak	SDSS	·	660 m	MPC · JPL
830858	2008 UB_{80}	—	September 9, 2008	Mount Lemmon	Mount Lemmon Survey	EUN	940 m	MPC · JPL
830859	2008 UA_{81}	—	September 22, 2008	Kitt Peak	Spacewatch	·	590 m	MPC · JPL
830860	2008 UP_{97}	—	October 7, 2008	Catalina	CSS	·	1.2 km	MPC · JPL
830861	2008 UO_{100}	—	October 28, 2008	Geisei	T. Seki	·	1.3 km	MPC · JPL
830862	2008 UW_{102}	—	October 20, 2008	Kitt Peak	Spacewatch	·	940 m	MPC · JPL
830863	2008 UB_{103}	—	October 20, 2008	Kitt Peak	Spacewatch	VER	2.0 km	MPC · JPL
830864	2008 UL_{103}	—	October 7, 2008	Mount Lemmon	Mount Lemmon Survey	PHO	720 m	MPC · JPL
830865	2008 UG_{107}	—	October 21, 2008	Kitt Peak	Spacewatch	·	1.4 km	MPC · JPL
830866	2008 UN_{112}	—	October 9, 2008	Kitt Peak	Spacewatch	HYG	1.9 km	MPC · JPL
830867	2008 UY_{112}	—	October 22, 2008	Kitt Peak	Spacewatch	·	490 m	MPC · JPL
830868	2008 UX_{123}	—	September 24, 2008	Mount Lemmon	Mount Lemmon Survey	critical	820 m	MPC · JPL
830869	2008 UP_{127}	—	October 22, 2008	Kitt Peak	Spacewatch	·	1.1 km	MPC · JPL
830870	2008 UZ_{128}	—	September 24, 2008	Kitt Peak	Spacewatch	·	560 m	MPC · JPL
830871	2008 UG_{129}	—	October 9, 2008	Kitt Peak	Spacewatch	·	590 m	MPC · JPL
830872	2008 UF_{130}	—	September 23, 2008	Mount Lemmon	Mount Lemmon Survey	·	1.3 km	MPC · JPL
830873	2008 UL_{136}	—	October 23, 2008	Kitt Peak	Spacewatch	NEM	1.5 km	MPC · JPL
830874	2008 UE_{137}	—	October 23, 2008	Kitt Peak	Spacewatch	·	2.1 km	MPC · JPL
830875	2008 UA_{140}	—	October 23, 2008	Kitt Peak	Spacewatch	ADE	1.3 km	MPC · JPL
830876	2008 UA_{144}	—	October 1, 2008	Kitt Peak	Spacewatch	·	3.1 km	MPC · JPL
830877	2008 UG_{144}	—	October 23, 2008	Kitt Peak	Spacewatch	·	1.1 km	MPC · JPL
830878	2008 UH_{144}	—	October 23, 2008	Kitt Peak	Spacewatch	·	1.3 km	MPC · JPL
830879	2008 UF_{146}	—	October 8, 2008	Kitt Peak	Spacewatch	V	460 m	MPC · JPL
830880	2008 UH_{147}	—	October 23, 2008	Kitt Peak	Spacewatch	·	1.1 km	MPC · JPL
830881	2008 UL_{149}	—	October 23, 2008	Mount Lemmon	Mount Lemmon Survey	·	1.9 km	MPC · JPL
830882	2008 UT_{154}	—	October 10, 2002	Sacramento Peak	SDSS	·	2.1 km	MPC · JPL
830883	2008 UG_{156}	—	October 3, 2008	Mount Lemmon	Mount Lemmon Survey	·	990 m	MPC · JPL
830884	2008 UO_{162}	—	October 24, 2008	Kitt Peak	Spacewatch	·	950 m	MPC · JPL
830885	2008 UR_{175}	—	September 22, 2008	Kitt Peak	Spacewatch	NYS	740 m	MPC · JPL
830886	2008 UU_{181}	—	October 24, 2008	Mount Lemmon	Mount Lemmon Survey	·	1.1 km	MPC · JPL
830887	2008 UT_{185}	—	October 24, 2008	Kitt Peak	Spacewatch	·	2.3 km	MPC · JPL
830888	2008 UX_{191}	—	October 5, 2008	La Sagra	OAM	·	1.4 km	MPC · JPL
830889	2008 UZ_{199}	—	August 26, 2008	Črni Vrh	Matičič, S.	·	1.3 km	MPC · JPL
830890	2008 UA_{206}	—	October 22, 2008	Kitt Peak	Spacewatch	·	880 m	MPC · JPL
830891	2008 UE_{211}	—	October 23, 2008	Kitt Peak	Spacewatch	·	360 m	MPC · JPL
830892	2008 UB_{218}	—	October 25, 2008	Kitt Peak	Spacewatch	·	1.1 km	MPC · JPL
830893	2008 UF_{223}	—	October 25, 2008	Kitt Peak	Spacewatch	·	1.1 km	MPC · JPL
830894	2008 UY_{232}	—	September 24, 2008	Mount Lemmon	Mount Lemmon Survey	·	1.7 km	MPC · JPL
830895	2008 UH_{237}	—	October 22, 2008	Kitt Peak	Spacewatch	·	730 m	MPC · JPL
830896	2008 UO_{238}	—	October 26, 2008	Kitt Peak	Spacewatch	·	1.0 km	MPC · JPL
830897	2008 UD_{240}	—	October 26, 2008	Kitt Peak	Spacewatch	·	1.5 km	MPC · JPL
830898	2008 UZ_{240}	—	October 26, 2008	Kitt Peak	Spacewatch	EUN	870 m	MPC · JPL
830899	2008 UV_{243}	—	October 26, 2008	Kitt Peak	Spacewatch	·	1.2 km	MPC · JPL
830900	2008 UU_{244}	—	October 26, 2008	Catalina	CSS	JUN	820 m	MPC · JPL

== 830901–831000 ==
back to top

Designation			Discovery			Properties		Ref
Permanent	Provisional	Named after	Date	Site	Discoverer(s)	Category	Diam.	Ref
830901	2008 UX_{244}	—	October 26, 2008	Kitt Peak	Spacewatch	·	1.1 km	MPC · JPL
830902	2008 UR_{251}	—	October 27, 2008	Kitt Peak	Spacewatch	·	1.2 km	MPC · JPL
830903	2008 UA_{252}	—	October 27, 2008	Kitt Peak	Spacewatch	615	980 m	MPC · JPL
830904	2008 UY_{255}	—	October 27, 2008	Kitt Peak	Spacewatch	·	1.2 km	MPC · JPL
830905	2008 UT_{258}	—	November 16, 2001	Kitt Peak	Spacewatch	·	450 m	MPC · JPL
830906	2008 UR_{261}	—	October 27, 2008	Kitt Peak	Spacewatch	ADE	1.5 km	MPC · JPL
830907	2008 UX_{266}	—	October 22, 2008	Kitt Peak	Spacewatch	·	560 m	MPC · JPL
830908	2008 UM_{269}	—	October 28, 2008	Kitt Peak	Spacewatch	·	2.8 km	MPC · JPL
830909	2008 UX_{273}	—	October 20, 2008	Kitt Peak	Spacewatch	EOS	1.7 km	MPC · JPL
830910	2008 UX_{279}	—	September 29, 2008	Kitt Peak	Spacewatch	·	1.4 km	MPC · JPL
830911	2008 UN_{283}	—	September 25, 2008	Kitt Peak	Spacewatch	THM	1.8 km	MPC · JPL
830912	2008 UG_{287}	—	September 26, 2008	Kitt Peak	Spacewatch	·	670 m	MPC · JPL
830913	2008 UJ_{289}	—	October 28, 2008	Kitt Peak	Spacewatch	·	1.6 km	MPC · JPL
830914	2008 UT_{292}	—	September 7, 2008	Catalina	CSS	·	1.1 km	MPC · JPL
830915	2008 UB_{293}	—	October 29, 2008	Kitt Peak	Spacewatch	EOS	1.3 km	MPC · JPL
830916	2008 UV_{294}	—	October 25, 2008	Kitt Peak	Spacewatch	·	2.1 km	MPC · JPL
830917	2008 UJ_{296}	—	October 29, 2008	Kitt Peak	Spacewatch	·	1.2 km	MPC · JPL
830918	2008 UQ_{297}	—	October 29, 2008	Kitt Peak	Spacewatch	·	1.6 km	MPC · JPL
830919	2008 UP_{298}	—	October 29, 2008	Kitt Peak	Spacewatch	·	1.8 km	MPC · JPL
830920	2008 UP_{306}	—	October 2, 2008	Kitt Peak	Spacewatch	T_{j} (2.99)	2.9 km	MPC · JPL
830921	2008 UQ_{307}	—	October 30, 2008	Kitt Peak	Spacewatch	·	560 m	MPC · JPL
830922	2008 UQ_{308}	—	October 26, 2008	Kitt Peak	Spacewatch	·	470 m	MPC · JPL
830923	2008 UG_{312}	—	September 28, 2008	Mount Lemmon	Mount Lemmon Survey	·	1.6 km	MPC · JPL
830924	2008 UL_{314}	—	October 22, 2008	Kitt Peak	Spacewatch	·	1.2 km	MPC · JPL
830925	2008 UH_{318}	—	September 24, 2008	Kitt Peak	Spacewatch	(5)	980 m	MPC · JPL
830926	2008 UM_{326}	—	October 31, 2008	Mount Lemmon	Mount Lemmon Survey	·	650 m	MPC · JPL
830927	2008 UC_{327}	—	October 31, 2008	Kitt Peak	Spacewatch	·	2.3 km	MPC · JPL
830928	2008 UU_{327}	—	September 23, 2008	Kitt Peak	Spacewatch	·	990 m	MPC · JPL
830929	2008 UM_{329}	—	October 15, 2001	Kitt Peak	Spacewatch	·	390 m	MPC · JPL
830930	2008 UD_{332}	—	October 26, 2008	Cerro Tololo	Wasserman, L. H.	L4 · 006	6.4 km	MPC · JPL
830931	2008 UM_{336}	—	October 23, 2008	Kitt Peak	Spacewatch	·	1.1 km	MPC · JPL
830932	2008 UQ_{339}	—	October 23, 2008	Kitt Peak	Spacewatch	·	1.7 km	MPC · JPL
830933	2008 UD_{355}	—	October 31, 2008	Kitt Peak	Spacewatch	EUP	2.2 km	MPC · JPL
830934	2008 US_{362}	—	October 25, 2008	Catalina	CSS	·	1.8 km	MPC · JPL
830935	2008 UJ_{366}	—	September 27, 2008	Mount Lemmon	Mount Lemmon Survey	·	1.2 km	MPC · JPL
830936	2008 UW_{366}	—	October 24, 2008	Kitt Peak	Spacewatch	·	670 m	MPC · JPL
830937	2008 UM_{375}	—	October 31, 2008	Kitt Peak	Spacewatch	·	620 m	MPC · JPL
830938	2008 UX_{380}	—	October 22, 2008	Kitt Peak	Spacewatch	·	1.5 km	MPC · JPL
830939	2008 UK_{382}	—	March 20, 2010	Kitt Peak	Spacewatch	·	2.7 km	MPC · JPL
830940	2008 UH_{383}	—	October 5, 2002	Sacramento Peak	SDSS	EOS	1.4 km	MPC · JPL
830941	2008 UX_{383}	—	October 23, 2008	Mount Lemmon	Mount Lemmon Survey	EOS	1.2 km	MPC · JPL
830942	2008 UV_{384}	—	October 22, 2008	Mount Lemmon	Mount Lemmon Survey	·	1.1 km	MPC · JPL
830943	2008 UR_{388}	—	June 26, 2015	Haleakala	Pan-STARRS 1	·	930 m	MPC · JPL
830944	2008 UW_{393}	—	October 27, 2008	Mount Lemmon	Mount Lemmon Survey	·	2.3 km	MPC · JPL
830945	2008 UA_{394}	—	October 20, 2008	Mount Lemmon	Mount Lemmon Survey	·	1.1 km	MPC · JPL
830946	2008 UC_{394}	—	December 11, 2014	Mount Lemmon	Mount Lemmon Survey	·	1.8 km	MPC · JPL
830947	2008 UC_{395}	—	October 24, 2008	Kitt Peak	Spacewatch	·	1.2 km	MPC · JPL
830948	2008 UK_{397}	—	November 28, 2013	Mount Lemmon	Mount Lemmon Survey	AGN	910 m	MPC · JPL
830949	2008 UY_{397}	—	October 28, 2014	Haleakala	Pan-STARRS 1	·	2.6 km	MPC · JPL
830950	2008 UL_{401}	—	October 26, 2008	Mount Lemmon	Mount Lemmon Survey	EOS	1.2 km	MPC · JPL
830951	2008 UG_{404}	—	October 28, 2008	Mount Lemmon	Mount Lemmon Survey	·	1.2 km	MPC · JPL
830952	2008 UL_{404}	—	October 28, 2008	Kitt Peak	Spacewatch	·	650 m	MPC · JPL
830953	2008 UJ_{405}	—	October 22, 2008	Kitt Peak	Spacewatch	·	950 m	MPC · JPL
830954	2008 UZ_{406}	—	October 23, 2008	Kitt Peak	Spacewatch	·	1.0 km	MPC · JPL
830955	2008 UB_{409}	—	October 20, 2008	Mount Lemmon	Mount Lemmon Survey	·	630 m	MPC · JPL
830956	2008 UP_{410}	—	October 21, 2008	Mount Lemmon	Mount Lemmon Survey	EUN	770 m	MPC · JPL
830957	2008 UU_{411}	—	October 29, 2008	Kitt Peak	Spacewatch	·	2.2 km	MPC · JPL
830958	2008 UQ_{414}	—	October 29, 2008	Kitt Peak	Spacewatch	·	1.3 km	MPC · JPL
830959	2008 UX_{414}	—	October 22, 2008	Kitt Peak	Spacewatch	EOS	1.5 km	MPC · JPL
830960	2008 UA_{415}	—	October 18, 2008	Cerro Las Campanas	EURONEAR	·	1.2 km	MPC · JPL
830961	2008 UV_{416}	—	September 27, 2008	Mount Lemmon	Mount Lemmon Survey	·	980 m	MPC · JPL
830962	2008 UD_{417}	—	October 25, 2008	Mount Lemmon	Mount Lemmon Survey	·	890 m	MPC · JPL
830963	2008 UE_{417}	—	October 23, 2008	Mount Lemmon	Mount Lemmon Survey	·	1.3 km	MPC · JPL
830964	2008 UZ_{417}	—	October 27, 2008	Mount Lemmon	Mount Lemmon Survey	·	1.2 km	MPC · JPL
830965	2008 UA_{418}	—	October 20, 2008	Mount Lemmon	Mount Lemmon Survey	·	1.1 km	MPC · JPL
830966	2008 UB_{418}	—	October 27, 2008	Mount Lemmon	Mount Lemmon Survey	·	890 m	MPC · JPL
830967	2008 UC_{418}	—	October 29, 2008	Mount Lemmon	Mount Lemmon Survey	EUN	830 m	MPC · JPL
830968	2008 UK_{418}	—	October 26, 2008	Mount Lemmon	Mount Lemmon Survey	·	1.1 km	MPC · JPL
830969	2008 UX_{419}	—	October 28, 2008	Kitt Peak	Spacewatch	·	1.2 km	MPC · JPL
830970	2008 UZ_{419}	—	October 22, 2008	Kitt Peak	Spacewatch	·	1.3 km	MPC · JPL
830971	2008 VA_{6}	—	November 1, 2008	Mount Lemmon	Mount Lemmon Survey	·	540 m	MPC · JPL
830972	2008 VQ_{9}	—	November 2, 2008	Mount Lemmon	Mount Lemmon Survey	·	2.1 km	MPC · JPL
830973	2008 VJ_{11}	—	November 2, 2008	Mount Lemmon	Mount Lemmon Survey	·	2.2 km	MPC · JPL
830974	2008 VA_{28}	—	October 23, 2008	Kitt Peak	Spacewatch	EUN	910 m	MPC · JPL
830975	2008 VD_{29}	—	November 2, 2008	Mount Lemmon	Mount Lemmon Survey	JUN	660 m	MPC · JPL
830976	2008 VZ_{30}	—	November 2, 2008	Mount Lemmon	Mount Lemmon Survey	·	1.7 km	MPC · JPL
830977	2008 VU_{37}	—	September 9, 2008	Mount Lemmon	Mount Lemmon Survey	·	540 m	MPC · JPL
830978	2008 VQ_{39}	—	November 2, 2008	Kitt Peak	Spacewatch	JUN	890 m	MPC · JPL
830979	2008 VC_{42}	—	November 3, 2008	Mount Lemmon	Mount Lemmon Survey	·	1.2 km	MPC · JPL
830980	2008 VR_{46}	—	November 3, 2008	Kitt Peak	Spacewatch	JUN	850 m	MPC · JPL
830981	2008 VV_{52}	—	October 8, 2008	Mount Lemmon	Mount Lemmon Survey	·	1.0 km	MPC · JPL
830982	2008 VP_{55}	—	October 20, 2008	Kitt Peak	Spacewatch	·	990 m	MPC · JPL
830983	2008 VU_{61}	—	November 8, 2008	Kitt Peak	Spacewatch	·	1.9 km	MPC · JPL
830984	2008 VS_{62}	—	November 8, 2008	Kitt Peak	Spacewatch	·	1.5 km	MPC · JPL
830985	2008 VK_{63}	—	October 23, 2008	Kitt Peak	Spacewatch	·	1.1 km	MPC · JPL
830986	2008 VO_{66}	—	November 3, 2008	Kitt Peak	Spacewatch	H	240 m	MPC · JPL
830987	2008 VG_{72}	—	November 1, 2008	Mount Lemmon	Mount Lemmon Survey	JUN	630 m	MPC · JPL
830988	2008 VM_{73}	—	November 6, 2008	Mount Lemmon	Mount Lemmon Survey	·	1.2 km	MPC · JPL
830989	2008 VT_{74}	—	November 2, 2008	Mount Lemmon	Mount Lemmon Survey	·	2.1 km	MPC · JPL
830990	2008 VW_{81}	—	November 2, 2008	Mount Lemmon	Mount Lemmon Survey	EUN	980 m	MPC · JPL
830991	2008 VY_{83}	—	November 3, 2008	Mount Lemmon	Mount Lemmon Survey	·	580 m	MPC · JPL
830992	2008 VQ_{84}	—	August 25, 2012	Haleakala	Pan-STARRS 1	·	1.2 km	MPC · JPL
830993	2008 VS_{85}	—	November 7, 2008	Kitt Peak	Spacewatch	H	430 m	MPC · JPL
830994	2008 VJ_{86}	—	November 7, 2008	Mount Lemmon	Mount Lemmon Survey	DOR	1.7 km	MPC · JPL
830995	2008 VA_{88}	—	November 1, 2008	Mount Lemmon	Mount Lemmon Survey	NEM	1.3 km	MPC · JPL
830996	2008 VU_{88}	—	November 9, 2008	Kitt Peak	Spacewatch	(21344)	1.1 km	MPC · JPL
830997	2008 VA_{89}	—	November 8, 2008	Mount Lemmon	Mount Lemmon Survey	·	3.5 km	MPC · JPL
830998	2008 VQ_{90}	—	September 26, 2008	Kitt Peak	Spacewatch	TIR	2.2 km	MPC · JPL
830999	2008 VP_{91}	—	January 6, 2010	Kitt Peak	Spacewatch	(21885)	2.5 km	MPC · JPL
831000	2008 VJ_{92}	—	January 11, 2016	Haleakala	Pan-STARRS 1	EOS	1.6 km	MPC · JPL

back to top
