= List of minor planets: 494001–495000 =

The following is a partial list of minor planets, running from minor-planet number 494001 through 495000, inclusive. The primary data for this and other partial lists is based on JPL's "Small-Body Orbital Elements" and data available from the Minor Planet Center. Critical list information is also provided by the MPC, unless otherwise specified from Lowell Observatory. A detailed description of the table's columns and additional sources are given on the main page including a complete list of every page in this series, and a statistical break-up on the dynamical classification of minor planets.

Also see the summary list of all named bodies in numerical and alphabetical order, and the corresponding naming citations for the number range of this particular list. New namings may only be added to this list after official publication, as the preannouncement of names is condemned by the Working Group for Small Bodies Nomenclature of the International Astronomical Union.

Near-Earth obj.	MBA (inner)	MBA (outer)	Centaur
Mars-crosser	MBA (middle)	Jupiter trojan	Trans-Neptunian obj.
Unclassified

== 494001–494100 ==
Designation			Discovery			Properties		Ref
Permanent	Provisional	Named after	Date	Site	Discoverer(s)	Category	Diam.	Ref
494001	2016 AB_{111}	—	February 8, 2011	Mount Lemmon	Mount Lemmon Survey	·	2.0 km	MPC · JPL
494002	2016 AF_{111}	—	September 11, 2010	Mount Lemmon	Mount Lemmon Survey	(5)	1.2 km	MPC · JPL
494003	2016 AS_{111}	—	October 5, 2004	Kitt Peak	Spacewatch	KOR	1.3 km	MPC · JPL
494004	2016 AX_{112}	—	April 2, 2011	Mount Lemmon	Mount Lemmon Survey	VER	2.3 km	MPC · JPL
494005	2016 AZ_{112}	—	February 14, 2008	Mount Lemmon	Mount Lemmon Survey	·	1.6 km	MPC · JPL
494006	2016 AD_{113}	—	November 26, 2003	Kitt Peak	Spacewatch	V	600 m	MPC · JPL
494007	2016 AW_{113}	—	December 15, 2004	Kitt Peak	Spacewatch	V	740 m	MPC · JPL
494008	2016 AN_{114}	—	January 19, 2008	Mount Lemmon	Mount Lemmon Survey	·	2.1 km	MPC · JPL
494009	2016 AU_{115}	—	November 21, 2009	Catalina	CSS	·	3.8 km	MPC · JPL
494010	2016 AZ_{118}	—	April 8, 2010	WISE	WISE	·	4.2 km	MPC · JPL
494011	2016 AJ_{121}	—	December 8, 2005	Kitt Peak	Spacewatch	HOF	3.1 km	MPC · JPL
494012	2016 AT_{121}	—	September 20, 2014	Haleakala	Pan-STARRS 1	CYB	4.6 km	MPC · JPL
494013	2016 AR_{122}	—	April 9, 2010	WISE	WISE	·	5.4 km	MPC · JPL
494014	2016 AV_{139}	—	December 10, 2009	Mount Lemmon	Mount Lemmon Survey	·	2.1 km	MPC · JPL
494015	2016 AK_{143}	—	October 28, 2008	Mount Lemmon	Mount Lemmon Survey	·	2.8 km	MPC · JPL
494016	2016 AU_{146}	—	September 21, 2009	Mount Lemmon	Mount Lemmon Survey	·	1.7 km	MPC · JPL
494017	2016 AA_{147}	—	March 11, 2011	Mount Lemmon	Mount Lemmon Survey	·	2.6 km	MPC · JPL
494018	2016 AJ_{154}	—	March 12, 2010	WISE	WISE	·	2.8 km	MPC · JPL
494019	2016 AB_{155}	—	March 15, 2007	Kitt Peak	Spacewatch	·	1.7 km	MPC · JPL
494020	2016 AK_{155}	—	November 19, 2003	Kitt Peak	Spacewatch	·	3.9 km	MPC · JPL
494021	2016 AR_{157}	—	September 29, 2009	Mount Lemmon	Mount Lemmon Survey	·	2.2 km	MPC · JPL
494022	2016 AU_{166}	—	May 1, 2000	Kitt Peak	Spacewatch	·	3.5 km	MPC · JPL
494023	2016 AW_{167}	—	March 5, 2011	Mount Lemmon	Mount Lemmon Survey	·	2.9 km	MPC · JPL
494024	2016 AY_{171}	—	March 13, 2011	Mount Lemmon	Mount Lemmon Survey	·	3.4 km	MPC · JPL
494025	2016 AQ_{172}	—	April 24, 2006	Kitt Peak	Spacewatch	·	3.9 km	MPC · JPL
494026	2016 AU_{173}	—	March 16, 2012	Mount Lemmon	Mount Lemmon Survey	·	1.9 km	MPC · JPL
494027	2016 AE_{174}	—	April 7, 2013	Kitt Peak	Spacewatch	·	1.7 km	MPC · JPL
494028	2016 AU_{174}	—	October 21, 1995	Kitt Peak	Spacewatch	·	1.5 km	MPC · JPL
494029	2016 AO_{175}	—	September 30, 2010	Mount Lemmon	Mount Lemmon Survey	·	1.3 km	MPC · JPL
494030	2016 AP_{184}	—	October 13, 2010	Mount Lemmon	Mount Lemmon Survey	NEM	2.1 km	MPC · JPL
494031	2016 AY_{184}	—	December 15, 2006	Kitt Peak	Spacewatch	·	2.8 km	MPC · JPL
494032	2016 AJ_{185}	—	January 30, 2012	Kitt Peak	Spacewatch	·	2.0 km	MPC · JPL
494033	2016 AM_{187}	—	November 18, 2003	Kitt Peak	Spacewatch	·	3.5 km	MPC · JPL
494034	2016 AN_{192}	—	October 1, 2009	Mount Lemmon	Mount Lemmon Survey	·	2.4 km	MPC · JPL
494035	2016 BX_{1}	—	November 6, 2010	Mount Lemmon	Mount Lemmon Survey	·	1.7 km	MPC · JPL
494036	2016 BW_{2}	—	September 27, 2009	Mount Lemmon	Mount Lemmon Survey	·	1.9 km	MPC · JPL
494037	2016 BD_{5}	—	December 18, 2004	Mount Lemmon	Mount Lemmon Survey	THM	2.2 km	MPC · JPL
494038	2016 BO_{16}	—	November 1, 2005	Mount Lemmon	Mount Lemmon Survey	AGN	1.6 km	MPC · JPL
494039	2016 BL_{17}	—	October 23, 2006	Mount Lemmon	Mount Lemmon Survey	·	1.4 km	MPC · JPL
494040	2016 BQ_{17}	—	March 15, 2010	WISE	WISE	·	3.2 km	MPC · JPL
494041	2016 BA_{19}	—	July 1, 2013	Haleakala	Pan-STARRS 1	·	2.7 km	MPC · JPL
494042	2016 BC_{21}	—	September 28, 2000	Kitt Peak	Spacewatch	AST	2.0 km	MPC · JPL
494043	2016 BU_{23}	—	April 27, 2012	Kitt Peak	Spacewatch	·	3.1 km	MPC · JPL
494044	2016 BG_{25}	—	September 30, 2008	Catalina	CSS	·	3.1 km	MPC · JPL
494045	2016 BC_{30}	—	August 26, 2013	Haleakala	Pan-STARRS 1	·	2.3 km	MPC · JPL
494046	2016 BJ_{30}	—	January 14, 2011	Kitt Peak	Spacewatch	KOR	1.1 km	MPC · JPL
494047	2016 BT_{30}	—	March 23, 2006	Kitt Peak	Spacewatch	·	2.1 km	MPC · JPL
494048	2016 BU_{31}	—	October 22, 2009	Mount Lemmon	Mount Lemmon Survey	·	2.3 km	MPC · JPL
494049	2016 BA_{33}	—	October 30, 2005	Mount Lemmon	Mount Lemmon Survey	HOF	2.7 km	MPC · JPL
494050	2016 BR_{33}	—	December 15, 2006	Kitt Peak	Spacewatch	·	1.7 km	MPC · JPL
494051	2016 BN_{35}	—	November 3, 2010	Kitt Peak	Spacewatch	MRX	890 m	MPC · JPL
494052	2016 BO_{36}	—	December 18, 2009	Kitt Peak	Spacewatch	·	3.1 km	MPC · JPL
494053	2016 BF_{37}	—	March 26, 2011	Mount Lemmon	Mount Lemmon Survey	EOS	2.0 km	MPC · JPL
494054	2016 BO_{44}	—	November 9, 1999	Socorro	LINEAR	·	1.2 km	MPC · JPL
494055	2016 BT_{48}	—	November 1, 2005	Mount Lemmon	Mount Lemmon Survey	AGN	1.3 km	MPC · JPL
494056	2016 BA_{50}	—	December 13, 2006	Kitt Peak	Spacewatch	WIT	960 m	MPC · JPL
494057	2016 BW_{51}	—	February 8, 2011	Mount Lemmon	Mount Lemmon Survey	·	1.3 km	MPC · JPL
494058	2016 BG_{53}	—	March 10, 2005	Mount Lemmon	Mount Lemmon Survey	·	2.6 km	MPC · JPL
494059	2016 BC_{54}	—	February 12, 2010	WISE	WISE	·	2.3 km	MPC · JPL
494060	2016 BT_{55}	—	October 28, 2014	Haleakala	Pan-STARRS 1	·	2.8 km	MPC · JPL
494061	2016 BU_{55}	—	February 10, 2011	Mount Lemmon	Mount Lemmon Survey	·	1.9 km	MPC · JPL
494062	2016 BX_{56}	—	August 7, 2008	Kitt Peak	Spacewatch	·	2.3 km	MPC · JPL
494063	2016 BL_{60}	—	October 25, 2005	Kitt Peak	Spacewatch	·	2.2 km	MPC · JPL
494064	2016 BQ_{60}	—	March 2, 2009	Kitt Peak	Spacewatch	V	700 m	MPC · JPL
494065	2016 BK_{64}	—	September 5, 1999	Kitt Peak	Spacewatch	KOR	1.3 km	MPC · JPL
494066	2016 BN_{65}	—	July 15, 2013	Haleakala	Pan-STARRS 1	·	2.4 km	MPC · JPL
494067	2016 BF_{67}	—	March 27, 2012	Mount Lemmon	Mount Lemmon Survey	·	2.2 km	MPC · JPL
494068	2016 BU_{67}	—	September 22, 2006	Catalina	CSS	·	1.3 km	MPC · JPL
494069	2016 BZ_{67}	—	September 16, 2014	Haleakala	Pan-STARRS 1	·	2.0 km	MPC · JPL
494070	2016 BE_{68}	—	April 7, 2006	Kitt Peak	Spacewatch	·	2.7 km	MPC · JPL
494071	2016 BK_{69}	—	December 16, 2009	Mount Lemmon	Mount Lemmon Survey	·	2.2 km	MPC · JPL
494072	2016 BW_{70}	—	April 2, 2010	WISE	WISE	·	3.1 km	MPC · JPL
494073	2016 BZ_{70}	—	February 16, 2012	Haleakala	Pan-STARRS 1	·	2.1 km	MPC · JPL
494074	2016 BC_{71}	—	January 7, 2010	Kitt Peak	Spacewatch	·	3.7 km	MPC · JPL
494075	2016 BV_{71}	—	September 3, 2013	Haleakala	Pan-STARRS 1	CYB	3.8 km	MPC · JPL
494076	2016 BK_{72}	—	October 1, 2008	Kitt Peak	Spacewatch	·	2.2 km	MPC · JPL
494077	2016 BL_{72}	—	August 18, 2009	Kitt Peak	Spacewatch	·	2.0 km	MPC · JPL
494078	2016 BB_{74}	—	February 9, 2005	Kitt Peak	Spacewatch	·	3.1 km	MPC · JPL
494079	2016 BY_{75}	—	December 18, 2009	Kitt Peak	Spacewatch	·	2.7 km	MPC · JPL
494080	2016 BY_{76}	—	October 16, 1977	Palomar	C. J. van Houten, I. van Houten-Groeneveld, T. Gehrels	·	720 m	MPC · JPL
494081	2016 BC_{81}	—	February 1, 2005	Kitt Peak	Spacewatch	·	2.7 km	MPC · JPL
494082	2016 CX	—	August 15, 2013	Haleakala	Pan-STARRS 1	·	2.2 km	MPC · JPL
494083	2016 CJ_{2}	—	February 17, 2007	Kitt Peak	Spacewatch	·	1.7 km	MPC · JPL
494084	2016 CU_{2}	—	March 9, 2005	Mount Lemmon	Mount Lemmon Survey	·	2.2 km	MPC · JPL
494085	2016 CK_{9}	—	February 7, 1999	Kitt Peak	Spacewatch	·	3.5 km	MPC · JPL
494086	2016 CF_{11}	—	February 24, 2006	Kitt Peak	Spacewatch	·	1.7 km	MPC · JPL
494087	2016 CU_{13}	—	August 14, 2001	Haleakala	NEAT	·	4.4 km	MPC · JPL
494088	2016 CR_{14}	—	October 12, 2009	Mount Lemmon	Mount Lemmon Survey	·	1.8 km	MPC · JPL
494089	2016 CP_{15}	—	October 28, 2005	Mount Lemmon	Mount Lemmon Survey	HOF	2.9 km	MPC · JPL
494090	2016 CA_{17}	—	October 9, 2008	Mount Lemmon	Mount Lemmon Survey	EOS	2.0 km	MPC · JPL
494091	2016 CE_{17}	—	October 10, 2004	Kitt Peak	Spacewatch	KOR	1.4 km	MPC · JPL
494092	2016 CW_{21}	—	February 26, 2007	Mount Lemmon	Mount Lemmon Survey	·	2.0 km	MPC · JPL
494093	2016 CU_{23}	—	September 21, 2003	Kitt Peak	Spacewatch	·	2.4 km	MPC · JPL
494094	2016 CH_{26}	—	March 12, 2011	Mount Lemmon	Mount Lemmon Survey	·	2.6 km	MPC · JPL
494095	2016 CW_{33}	—	January 15, 2005	Kitt Peak	Spacewatch	·	2.7 km	MPC · JPL
494096	2016 CL_{35}	—	November 11, 2009	Mount Lemmon	Mount Lemmon Survey	·	1.5 km	MPC · JPL
494097	2016 CG_{36}	—	January 26, 2006	Kitt Peak	Spacewatch	TEL	1.6 km	MPC · JPL
494098	2016 CN_{36}	—	February 9, 2010	Mount Lemmon	Mount Lemmon Survey	·	3.3 km	MPC · JPL
494099	2016 CL_{37}	—	November 18, 2003	Kitt Peak	Spacewatch	·	2.6 km	MPC · JPL
494100	2016 CK_{38}	—	October 4, 1999	Kitt Peak	Spacewatch	KOR	1.2 km	MPC · JPL

== 494101–494200 ==
back to top

Designation			Discovery			Properties		Ref
Permanent	Provisional	Named after	Date	Site	Discoverer(s)	Category	Diam.	Ref
494101	2016 CH_{39}	—	February 25, 2011	Mount Lemmon	Mount Lemmon Survey	·	1.8 km	MPC · JPL
494102	2016 CE_{40}	—	November 25, 2005	Mount Lemmon	Mount Lemmon Survey	AST	1.4 km	MPC · JPL
494103	2016 CL_{40}	—	January 21, 2006	Kitt Peak	Spacewatch	KOR	1.2 km	MPC · JPL
494104	2016 CN_{40}	—	January 26, 2006	Mount Lemmon	Mount Lemmon Survey	KOR	1.2 km	MPC · JPL
494105	2016 CT_{40}	—	January 26, 2007	Kitt Peak	Spacewatch	AGN	1.2 km	MPC · JPL
494106	2016 CB_{42}	—	December 13, 2004	Kitt Peak	Spacewatch	·	1.7 km	MPC · JPL
494107	2016 CE_{44}	—	October 28, 2005	Kitt Peak	Spacewatch	·	1.6 km	MPC · JPL
494108	2016 CP_{45}	—	November 8, 2009	Mount Lemmon	Mount Lemmon Survey	·	1.9 km	MPC · JPL
494109	2016 CH_{48}	—	September 5, 2007	Catalina	CSS	V	780 m	MPC · JPL
494110	2016 CT_{50}	—	March 2, 2011	Kitt Peak	Spacewatch	(1298)	2.9 km	MPC · JPL
494111	2016 CK_{58}	—	January 19, 1994	Kitt Peak	Spacewatch	EOS	2.4 km	MPC · JPL
494112	2016 CY_{71}	—	October 13, 2014	Mount Lemmon	Mount Lemmon Survey	·	2.2 km	MPC · JPL
494113	2016 CM_{75}	—	September 27, 2003	Kitt Peak	Spacewatch	·	2.7 km	MPC · JPL
494114	2016 CP_{94}	—	March 1, 2012	Mount Lemmon	Mount Lemmon Survey	EUN	1.1 km	MPC · JPL
494115	2016 CG_{105}	—	September 22, 2014	Haleakala	Pan-STARRS 1	·	3.2 km	MPC · JPL
494116	2016 CL_{105}	—	July 29, 2009	Kitt Peak	Spacewatch	·	2.6 km	MPC · JPL
494117	2016 CD_{108}	—	May 6, 2006	Mount Lemmon	Mount Lemmon Survey	·	3.4 km	MPC · JPL
494118	2016 CL_{109}	—	July 29, 2008	Mount Lemmon	Mount Lemmon Survey	·	1.9 km	MPC · JPL
494119	2016 CO_{113}	—	August 26, 2013	Haleakala	Pan-STARRS 1	·	2.8 km	MPC · JPL
494120	2016 CJ_{115}	—	September 10, 2013	Haleakala	Pan-STARRS 1	EOS	2.2 km	MPC · JPL
494121	2016 CE_{126}	—	August 23, 2014	Haleakala	Pan-STARRS 1	·	3.1 km	MPC · JPL
494122	2016 CK_{126}	—	February 12, 2011	Mount Lemmon	Mount Lemmon Survey	·	1.7 km	MPC · JPL
494123	2016 CL_{138}	—	October 17, 2010	Catalina	CSS	·	1.9 km	MPC · JPL
494124	2016 CH_{140}	—	May 16, 2012	Mount Lemmon	Mount Lemmon Survey	EOS	1.3 km	MPC · JPL
494125	2016 CM_{145}	—	January 30, 2006	Kitt Peak	Spacewatch	·	1.5 km	MPC · JPL
494126	2016 CP_{148}	—	October 23, 2003	Kitt Peak	Spacewatch	·	2.5 km	MPC · JPL
494127	2016 CN_{153}	—	December 19, 2004	Mount Lemmon	Mount Lemmon Survey	·	910 m	MPC · JPL
494128	2016 CW_{153}	—	January 12, 2002	Kitt Peak	Spacewatch	HOF	3.2 km	MPC · JPL
494129	2016 CK_{158}	—	March 4, 2005	Mount Lemmon	Mount Lemmon Survey	·	2.9 km	MPC · JPL
494130	2016 CJ_{166}	—	March 6, 2011	Mount Lemmon	Mount Lemmon Survey	EOS	1.9 km	MPC · JPL
494131	2016 CM_{171}	—	December 12, 2004	Kitt Peak	Spacewatch	·	2.2 km	MPC · JPL
494132	2016 CB_{172}	—	January 28, 2011	Mount Lemmon	Mount Lemmon Survey	·	1.5 km	MPC · JPL
494133	2016 CP_{180}	—	November 17, 2014	Mount Lemmon	Mount Lemmon Survey	·	2.4 km	MPC · JPL
494134	2016 CA_{182}	—	May 15, 2012	Mount Lemmon	Mount Lemmon Survey	EOS	1.5 km	MPC · JPL
494135	2016 CP_{185}	—	April 19, 2006	Kitt Peak	Spacewatch	·	2.5 km	MPC · JPL
494136	2016 CZ_{187}	—	May 19, 2012	Haleakala	Pan-STARRS 1	EOS	1.3 km	MPC · JPL
494137	2016 CP_{188}	—	January 9, 2002	Socorro	LINEAR	GEF	1.3 km	MPC · JPL
494138	2016 CJ_{198}	—	June 14, 2012	Mount Lemmon	Mount Lemmon Survey	CYB	3.6 km	MPC · JPL
494139	2016 CD_{199}	—	March 13, 2010	WISE	WISE	EOS	4.1 km	MPC · JPL
494140	2016 CW_{199}	—	November 19, 2003	Kitt Peak	Spacewatch	THM	2.5 km	MPC · JPL
494141	2016 CR_{201}	—	October 25, 2014	Mount Lemmon	Mount Lemmon Survey	·	2.6 km	MPC · JPL
494142	2016 CR_{202}	—	November 21, 2014	Haleakala	Pan-STARRS 1	·	3.2 km	MPC · JPL
494143	2016 CN_{208}	—	February 8, 2007	Kitt Peak	Spacewatch	·	1.9 km	MPC · JPL
494144	2016 CA_{215}	—	June 21, 2007	Mount Lemmon	Mount Lemmon Survey	·	3.5 km	MPC · JPL
494145	2016 CZ_{218}	—	February 21, 2006	Mount Lemmon	Mount Lemmon Survey	KOR	1.4 km	MPC · JPL
494146	2016 CM_{219}	—	March 8, 2005	Mount Lemmon	Mount Lemmon Survey	THM	1.8 km	MPC · JPL
494147	2016 CQ_{238}	—	October 6, 2008	Mount Lemmon	Mount Lemmon Survey	·	2.7 km	MPC · JPL
494148	2016 CL_{239}	—	May 21, 2006	Kitt Peak	Spacewatch	·	3.9 km	MPC · JPL
494149	2016 CL_{250}	—	September 22, 2009	Kitt Peak	Spacewatch	KOR	1.3 km	MPC · JPL
494150	2016 CJ_{251}	—	April 2, 2010	WISE	WISE	·	3.7 km	MPC · JPL
494151	2016 CY_{255}	—	November 2, 2008	Mount Lemmon	Mount Lemmon Survey	·	3.9 km	MPC · JPL
494152	2016 CD_{256}	—	February 28, 2006	Catalina	CSS	·	2.7 km	MPC · JPL
494153	2016 CU_{259}	—	May 27, 2010	WISE	WISE	·	4.9 km	MPC · JPL
494154	2016 CY_{259}	—	May 4, 2005	Mount Lemmon	Mount Lemmon Survey	·	1.1 km	MPC · JPL
494155	2016 CE_{264}	—	December 13, 2010	Mount Lemmon	Mount Lemmon Survey	·	2.0 km	MPC · JPL
494156	2016 CQ_{264}	—	October 25, 2014	Haleakala	Pan-STARRS 1	HYG	2.5 km	MPC · JPL
494157	2016 DP_{15}	—	February 26, 2012	Haleakala	Pan-STARRS 1	·	1.6 km	MPC · JPL
494158	2016 EX	—	January 16, 2013	Haleakala	Pan-STARRS 1	centaur	20 km	MPC · JPL
494159	2016 ED_{68}	—	August 15, 2013	Haleakala	Pan-STARRS 1	·	3.1 km	MPC · JPL
494160	2016 ED_{76}	—	April 18, 2010	WISE	WISE	·	3.9 km	MPC · JPL
494161	2016 ED_{89}	—	November 20, 2008	Mount Lemmon	Mount Lemmon Survey	·	2.3 km	MPC · JPL
494162	2016 EV_{107}	—	September 6, 2013	Mount Lemmon	Mount Lemmon Survey	·	2.6 km	MPC · JPL
494163	2016 FK_{2}	—	December 29, 2014	Haleakala	Pan-STARRS 1	3:2	4.1 km	MPC · JPL
494164	2016 GD_{112}	—	October 8, 2007	Mount Lemmon	Mount Lemmon Survey	·	2.3 km	MPC · JPL
494165	2016 GU_{112}	—	December 30, 2005	Kitt Peak	Spacewatch	·	1.6 km	MPC · JPL
494166	2016 GF_{113}	—	November 21, 1997	Kitt Peak	Spacewatch	·	660 m	MPC · JPL
494167	2016 GZ_{122}	—	September 18, 2007	Kitt Peak	Spacewatch	·	2.3 km	MPC · JPL
494168	2016 GE_{126}	—	April 1, 2008	Kitt Peak	Spacewatch	·	1.2 km	MPC · JPL
494169	2016 GA_{133}	—	November 5, 2007	Mount Lemmon	Mount Lemmon Survey	·	2.6 km	MPC · JPL
494170	2016 GJ_{133}	—	September 28, 2008	Mount Lemmon	Mount Lemmon Survey	KOR	1.3 km	MPC · JPL
494171	2016 GT_{145}	—	October 11, 2007	Kitt Peak	Spacewatch	HYG	3.1 km	MPC · JPL
494172	2016 GZ_{145}	—	September 19, 2003	Kitt Peak	Spacewatch	(2076)	1.1 km	MPC · JPL
494173	2016 GO_{164}	—	January 29, 1995	Kitt Peak	Spacewatch	·	650 m	MPC · JPL
494174	2016 GR_{164}	—	February 6, 2007	Mount Lemmon	Mount Lemmon Survey	·	1.1 km	MPC · JPL
494175	2016 GR_{165}	—	September 18, 2007	Kitt Peak	Spacewatch	·	2.8 km	MPC · JPL
494176	2016 GS_{174}	—	January 21, 2012	Haleakala	Pan-STARRS 1	·	1.2 km	MPC · JPL
494177	2016 GC_{175}	—	September 23, 2008	Mount Lemmon	Mount Lemmon Survey	·	1.8 km	MPC · JPL
494178	2016 GX_{176}	—	April 5, 2010	Mount Lemmon	Mount Lemmon Survey	·	2.9 km	MPC · JPL
494179	2016 GA_{185}	—	October 5, 2005	Catalina	CSS	·	1.9 km	MPC · JPL
494180	2016 GF_{229}	—	March 3, 2006	Kitt Peak	Spacewatch	·	2.7 km	MPC · JPL
494181	2016 GF_{230}	—	March 11, 2005	Kitt Peak	Spacewatch	·	2.8 km	MPC · JPL
494182	2016 GD_{242}	—	February 15, 2010	Catalina	CSS	·	2.6 km	MPC · JPL
494183	2016 GA_{247}	—	May 17, 2010	WISE	WISE	·	2.9 km	MPC · JPL
494184	2016 GC_{247}	—	October 30, 2008	Kitt Peak	Spacewatch	EOS	2.4 km	MPC · JPL
494185	2016 GF_{247}	—	April 29, 2003	Socorro	LINEAR	·	1.7 km	MPC · JPL
494186	2016 GG_{247}	—	March 9, 2011	Mount Lemmon	Mount Lemmon Survey	·	2.3 km	MPC · JPL
494187	2016 GM_{247}	—	October 3, 1999	Kitt Peak	Spacewatch	KOR	1.4 km	MPC · JPL
494188	2016 GZ_{248}	—	May 17, 2001	Kitt Peak	Spacewatch	·	1.3 km	MPC · JPL
494189	2016 GL_{249}	—	October 23, 2003	Kitt Peak	Spacewatch	·	2.2 km	MPC · JPL
494190	2016 GQ_{249}	—	March 9, 2005	Mount Lemmon	Mount Lemmon Survey	·	2.8 km	MPC · JPL
494191	2016 HC_{1}	—	October 3, 2013	Kitt Peak	Spacewatch	·	1.8 km	MPC · JPL
494192	2016 HG_{1}	—	September 29, 2005	Mount Lemmon	Mount Lemmon Survey	·	1.1 km	MPC · JPL
494193	2016 HJ_{1}	—	February 14, 2010	Mount Lemmon	Mount Lemmon Survey	KOR	1.6 km	MPC · JPL
494194	2016 HK_{1}	—	May 13, 2010	WISE	WISE	·	3.7 km	MPC · JPL
494195	2016 HP_{1}	—	October 11, 2012	Haleakala	Pan-STARRS 1	·	1.9 km	MPC · JPL
494196	2016 HQ_{1}	—	May 1, 2006	Kitt Peak	Spacewatch	·	620 m	MPC · JPL
494197	2016 HF_{6}	—	October 25, 2013	Mount Lemmon	Mount Lemmon Survey	·	2.4 km	MPC · JPL
494198	2016 HE_{7}	—	February 6, 2007	Mount Lemmon	Mount Lemmon Survey	·	1.1 km	MPC · JPL
494199	2016 HG_{7}	—	April 11, 2005	Mount Lemmon	Mount Lemmon Survey	NYS	1.0 km	MPC · JPL
494200	2016 HV_{7}	—	April 2, 2005	Kitt Peak	Spacewatch	·	2.0 km	MPC · JPL

== 494201–494300 ==
back to top

Designation			Discovery			Properties		Ref
Permanent	Provisional	Named after	Date	Site	Discoverer(s)	Category	Diam.	Ref
494201	2016 HJ_{9}	—	December 20, 2009	Kitt Peak	Spacewatch	MRX	1.2 km	MPC · JPL
494202	2016 HT_{9}	—	March 15, 2001	Kitt Peak	Spacewatch	·	1.3 km	MPC · JPL
494203	2016 HB_{10}	—	February 27, 2006	Kitt Peak	Spacewatch	·	710 m	MPC · JPL
494204	2016 HO_{11}	—	April 5, 2005	Mount Lemmon	Mount Lemmon Survey	·	2.5 km	MPC · JPL
494205	2016 HT_{13}	—	October 28, 2008	Kitt Peak	Spacewatch	EOS	1.8 km	MPC · JPL
494206	2016 HM_{14}	—	December 9, 2006	Kitt Peak	Spacewatch	·	1.3 km	MPC · JPL
494207	2016 HQ_{14}	—	February 1, 2005	Kitt Peak	Spacewatch	·	2.2 km	MPC · JPL
494208	2016 HZ_{14}	—	February 2, 2006	Kitt Peak	Spacewatch	·	1.8 km	MPC · JPL
494209	2016 HH_{15}	—	November 5, 2007	Kitt Peak	Spacewatch	·	3.5 km	MPC · JPL
494210	2016 HO_{15}	—	November 9, 2009	Kitt Peak	Spacewatch	(5)	980 m	MPC · JPL
494211	2016 HC_{16}	—	October 12, 2013	Mount Lemmon	Mount Lemmon Survey	·	1.4 km	MPC · JPL
494212	2016 HS_{18}	—	December 2, 2008	Kitt Peak	Spacewatch	·	2.4 km	MPC · JPL
494213	2016 HQ_{23}	—	January 1, 2008	Mount Lemmon	Mount Lemmon Survey	·	1.2 km	MPC · JPL
494214	2016 JV_{6}	—	November 6, 2013	Haleakala	Pan-STARRS 1	·	3.4 km	MPC · JPL
494215	2016 JX_{6}	—	July 22, 2006	Mount Lemmon	Mount Lemmon Survey	·	980 m	MPC · JPL
494216	2016 JP_{19}	—	September 20, 2001	Socorro	LINEAR	·	2.5 km	MPC · JPL
494217	2016 JJ_{25}	—	February 17, 2004	Kitt Peak	Spacewatch	·	2.9 km	MPC · JPL
494218	2016 JR_{36}	—	July 18, 2013	Haleakala	Pan-STARRS 1	EUN	1.3 km	MPC · JPL
494219	2016 LN_{8}	—	September 23, 2012	Mount Lemmon	Mount Lemmon Survey	T_{j} (2.43)	10 km	MPC · JPL
494220	2016 LK_{42}	—	October 24, 2011	Haleakala	Pan-STARRS 1	THB	1.7 km	MPC · JPL
494221	2016 NZ_{6}	—	February 14, 2010	Mount Lemmon	Mount Lemmon Survey	·	1.3 km	MPC · JPL
494222	2016 ND_{10}	—	February 10, 2014	Haleakala	Pan-STARRS 1	·	1.7 km	MPC · JPL
494223	2016 NQ_{11}	—	December 14, 2013	Mount Lemmon	Mount Lemmon Survey	(5)	1.5 km	MPC · JPL
494224	2016 NQ_{17}	—	December 16, 2006	Mount Lemmon	Mount Lemmon Survey	·	1.5 km	MPC · JPL
494225	2016 NB_{21}	—	August 22, 2011	La Sagra	OAM	EOS	2.3 km	MPC · JPL
494226	2016 NP_{24}	—	May 15, 2008	Mount Lemmon	Mount Lemmon Survey	3:2 · (6124)	6.7 km	MPC · JPL
494227	2016 NX_{24}	—	July 3, 2005	Mount Lemmon	Mount Lemmon Survey	THM	2.0 km	MPC · JPL
494228	2016 ND_{36}	—	December 4, 2008	Mount Lemmon	Mount Lemmon Survey	·	1.1 km	MPC · JPL
494229	2016 NY_{43}	—	October 16, 2009	Mount Lemmon	Mount Lemmon Survey	3:2 · SHU	4.5 km	MPC · JPL
494230	2016 NZ_{44}	—	March 2, 2009	Kitt Peak	Spacewatch	·	2.4 km	MPC · JPL
494231	2016 NA_{47}	—	December 29, 2003	Kitt Peak	Spacewatch	·	1.3 km	MPC · JPL
494232	2016 NL_{50}	—	April 3, 2011	Haleakala	Pan-STARRS 1	NYS	1.4 km	MPC · JPL
494233	2016 NE_{52}	—	September 22, 2003	Kitt Peak	Spacewatch	·	1.9 km	MPC · JPL
494234	2016 NJ_{53}	—	October 9, 2007	Kitt Peak	Spacewatch	·	2.3 km	MPC · JPL
494235	2016 PE_{3}	—	November 25, 2000	Kitt Peak	Spacewatch	HYG	2.2 km	MPC · JPL
494236	2016 PX_{9}	—	April 4, 2010	Kitt Peak	Spacewatch	HOF	2.1 km	MPC · JPL
494237	2016 PM_{10}	—	October 4, 2004	Palomar	NEAT	·	1.2 km	MPC · JPL
494238	2016 PN_{13}	—	December 18, 2007	Kitt Peak	Spacewatch	EOS	2.0 km	MPC · JPL
494239	2016 PB_{24}	—	January 14, 2008	Kitt Peak	Spacewatch	·	4.1 km	MPC · JPL
494240	2016 PP_{25}	—	October 6, 2012	Kitt Peak	Spacewatch	·	1.7 km	MPC · JPL
494241	2016 PT_{27}	—	October 6, 2012	Haleakala	Pan-STARRS 1	·	2.1 km	MPC · JPL
494242	2016 PL_{29}	—	January 10, 2008	Desert Eagle	W. K. Y. Yeung	EOS	2.1 km	MPC · JPL
494243	2016 PU_{55}	—	November 7, 2007	Kitt Peak	Spacewatch	·	1.8 km	MPC · JPL
494244	2016 PD_{59}	—	November 5, 2007	Kitt Peak	Spacewatch	·	2.1 km	MPC · JPL
494245	2016 PC_{75}	—	October 30, 1999	Kitt Peak	Spacewatch	THB	2.8 km	MPC · JPL
494246	2016 QB_{1}	—	January 12, 2010	Mount Lemmon	Mount Lemmon Survey	·	1.2 km	MPC · JPL
494247	2016 QR_{6}	—	September 24, 2008	Kitt Peak	Spacewatch	·	1.4 km	MPC · JPL
494248	2016 QE_{13}	—	July 25, 2006	Mount Lemmon	Mount Lemmon Survey	·	1.8 km	MPC · JPL
494249	2016 QL_{14}	—	September 25, 2012	Catalina	CSS	·	990 m	MPC · JPL
494250	2016 QM_{17}	—	October 1, 2011	Kitt Peak	Spacewatch	·	2.6 km	MPC · JPL
494251	2016 QO_{20}	—	November 30, 2005	Kitt Peak	Spacewatch	·	930 m	MPC · JPL
494252	2016 QM_{21}	—	September 20, 2003	Kitt Peak	Spacewatch	·	1.6 km	MPC · JPL
494253	2016 QK_{23}	—	August 31, 2011	Haleakala	Pan-STARRS 1	·	1.8 km	MPC · JPL
494254	2016 QP_{30}	—	April 14, 2010	Mount Lemmon	Mount Lemmon Survey	·	1.7 km	MPC · JPL
494255	2016 QX_{30}	—	January 24, 2014	Haleakala	Pan-STARRS 1	NYS	810 m	MPC · JPL
494256	2016 QH_{34}	—	September 12, 2005	Kitt Peak	Spacewatch	·	2.7 km	MPC · JPL
494257	2016 QN_{35}	—	October 6, 2008	Kitt Peak	Spacewatch	(5)	1.0 km	MPC · JPL
494258	2016 QA_{39}	—	November 28, 2005	Kitt Peak	Spacewatch	V	630 m	MPC · JPL
494259	2016 QH_{39}	—	February 9, 2008	Mount Lemmon	Mount Lemmon Survey	·	630 m	MPC · JPL
494260	2016 QL_{41}	—	March 18, 2010	Mount Lemmon	Mount Lemmon Survey	·	2.0 km	MPC · JPL
494261	2016 QW_{49}	—	May 4, 2005	Mount Lemmon	Mount Lemmon Survey	KOR	1.3 km	MPC · JPL
494262	2016 QS_{52}	—	October 7, 2005	Kitt Peak	Spacewatch	·	2.6 km	MPC · JPL
494263	2016 QT_{53}	—	September 1, 2005	Kitt Peak	Spacewatch	HYG	2.3 km	MPC · JPL
494264	2016 QC_{54}	—	November 26, 2003	Kitt Peak	Spacewatch	·	670 m	MPC · JPL
494265	2016 QL_{55}	—	November 21, 2006	Mount Lemmon	Mount Lemmon Survey	EOS	1.9 km	MPC · JPL
494266	2016 QY_{55}	—	November 1, 2006	Mount Lemmon	Mount Lemmon Survey	EOS	2.1 km	MPC · JPL
494267	2016 QO_{57}	—	October 11, 2007	Kitt Peak	Spacewatch	·	4.2 km	MPC · JPL
494268	2016 QZ_{64}	—	November 4, 2012	Kitt Peak	Spacewatch	·	1.9 km	MPC · JPL
494269	2016 QY_{65}	—	October 19, 2006	Kitt Peak	Spacewatch	·	2.8 km	MPC · JPL
494270	2016 QU_{69}	—	August 31, 2011	Haleakala	Pan-STARRS 1	·	1.9 km	MPC · JPL
494271	2016 QO_{70}	—	November 19, 2008	Mount Lemmon	Mount Lemmon Survey	·	980 m	MPC · JPL
494272	2016 QR_{73}	—	July 30, 2008	Mount Lemmon	Mount Lemmon Survey	·	960 m	MPC · JPL
494273	2016 QZ_{77}	—	October 8, 2007	Catalina	CSS	·	1.7 km	MPC · JPL
494274	2016 QB_{78}	—	September 28, 2003	Kitt Peak	Spacewatch	EUN	1.1 km	MPC · JPL
494275	2016 QQ_{83}	—	November 7, 2012	Kitt Peak	Spacewatch	(5)	1.2 km	MPC · JPL
494276	2016 RL_{3}	—	June 20, 2004	Kitt Peak	Spacewatch	HYG	4.1 km	MPC · JPL
494277	2016 RG_{4}	—	October 28, 2008	Mount Lemmon	Mount Lemmon Survey	·	1.9 km	MPC · JPL
494278	2016 RW_{6}	—	October 2, 2006	Kitt Peak	Spacewatch	·	2.1 km	MPC · JPL
494279	2016 RZ_{6}	—	October 12, 2006	Kitt Peak	Spacewatch	·	2.1 km	MPC · JPL
494280	2016 RC_{10}	—	April 6, 2010	Mount Lemmon	Mount Lemmon Survey	·	1.7 km	MPC · JPL
494281	2016 RS_{10}	—	November 14, 2006	Mount Lemmon	Mount Lemmon Survey	·	2.2 km	MPC · JPL
494282	2016 RJ_{11}	—	August 29, 2005	Kitt Peak	Spacewatch	·	2.9 km	MPC · JPL
494283	2016 RE_{12}	—	August 29, 1995	Kitt Peak	Spacewatch	V	430 m	MPC · JPL
494284	2016 RC_{13}	—	November 18, 2009	Kitt Peak	Spacewatch	·	940 m	MPC · JPL
494285	2016 RD_{13}	—	October 28, 2008	Kitt Peak	Spacewatch	·	1.2 km	MPC · JPL
494286	2016 RH_{13}	—	March 29, 2011	Mount Lemmon	Mount Lemmon Survey	·	710 m	MPC · JPL
494287	2016 RF_{14}	—	September 10, 2007	Kitt Peak	Spacewatch	AGN	1.0 km	MPC · JPL
494288	2016 RJ_{15}	—	November 5, 2007	Kitt Peak	Spacewatch	·	2.3 km	MPC · JPL
494289	2016 RM_{15}	—	January 10, 2008	Catalina	CSS	·	2.1 km	MPC · JPL
494290	2016 RJ_{21}	—	November 27, 2009	Mount Lemmon	Mount Lemmon Survey	·	1.2 km	MPC · JPL
494291	2016 RN_{23}	—	May 10, 2007	Mount Lemmon	Mount Lemmon Survey	·	1.7 km	MPC · JPL
494292	2016 RP_{25}	—	December 30, 2008	Kitt Peak	Spacewatch	HOF	2.3 km	MPC · JPL
494293	2016 RG_{27}	—	August 31, 2005	Kitt Peak	Spacewatch	EOS	1.8 km	MPC · JPL
494294	2016 RP_{29}	—	November 4, 2005	Mount Lemmon	Mount Lemmon Survey	HYG · fast	2.6 km	MPC · JPL
494295	2016 RM_{30}	—	March 28, 2011	Mount Lemmon	Mount Lemmon Survey	·	660 m	MPC · JPL
494296	2016 RT_{34}	—	October 14, 2012	Kitt Peak	Spacewatch	(5)	1.0 km	MPC · JPL
494297	2016 RJ_{35}	—	October 3, 2006	Mount Lemmon	Mount Lemmon Survey	·	1.0 km	MPC · JPL
494298	2016 RJ_{36}	—	October 15, 2012	Kitt Peak	Spacewatch	·	1.0 km	MPC · JPL
494299	2016 RC_{42}	—	November 30, 2005	Kitt Peak	Spacewatch	·	1.2 km	MPC · JPL
494300	2016 SQ_{4}	—	November 9, 2009	Kitt Peak	Spacewatch	PHO	2.1 km	MPC · JPL

== 494301–494400 ==
back to top

Designation			Discovery			Properties		Ref
Permanent	Provisional	Named after	Date	Site	Discoverer(s)	Category	Diam.	Ref
494301	2016 SO_{7}	—	June 15, 2010	WISE	WISE	·	2.4 km	MPC · JPL
494302	2016 SA_{8}	—	September 17, 2003	Kitt Peak	Spacewatch	EUN	1.0 km	MPC · JPL
494303	2016 SG_{9}	—	September 23, 2005	Catalina	CSS	·	1.3 km	MPC · JPL
494304	2016 SM_{9}	—	August 6, 2012	Haleakala	Pan-STARRS 1	·	1.3 km	MPC · JPL
494305	2016 SV_{10}	—	October 1, 2005	Catalina	CSS	·	740 m	MPC · JPL
494306	2016 SG_{11}	—	August 31, 2005	Kitt Peak	Spacewatch	·	710 m	MPC · JPL
494307	2016 SY_{11}	—	October 25, 2005	Kitt Peak	Spacewatch	THM	2.3 km	MPC · JPL
494308	2016 SF_{14}	—	October 26, 2008	Mount Lemmon	Mount Lemmon Survey	(5)	880 m	MPC · JPL
494309	2016 SE_{16}	—	February 25, 2006	Kitt Peak	Spacewatch	·	1.7 km	MPC · JPL
494310	2016 SH_{18}	—	July 8, 2008	La Sagra	OAM	·	1.1 km	MPC · JPL
494311	2016 SJ_{19}	—	July 31, 2011	Haleakala	Pan-STARRS 1	·	1.6 km	MPC · JPL
494312	2016 SU_{21}	—	April 25, 2003	Kitt Peak	Spacewatch	·	1.6 km	MPC · JPL
494313	2016 SG_{22}	—	March 18, 2010	Kitt Peak	Spacewatch	·	1.9 km	MPC · JPL
494314	2016 SG_{29}	—	November 15, 2003	Kitt Peak	Spacewatch	·	1.8 km	MPC · JPL
494315	2016 SD_{35}	—	August 31, 2000	Socorro	LINEAR	·	2.5 km	MPC · JPL
494316	2016 SL_{38}	—	April 22, 2007	Kitt Peak	Spacewatch	·	1.0 km	MPC · JPL
494317	2016 SP_{44}	—	October 27, 2005	Kitt Peak	Spacewatch	·	2.5 km	MPC · JPL
494318	2016 SD_{46}	—	September 30, 2005	Catalina	CSS	·	1.5 km	MPC · JPL
494319	2016 TK_{1}	—	October 21, 2011	Kitt Peak	Spacewatch	·	2.1 km	MPC · JPL
494320	2016 TO_{1}	—	May 22, 2011	Mount Lemmon	Mount Lemmon Survey	·	1.2 km	MPC · JPL
494321	2016 TU_{1}	—	October 8, 2007	Kitt Peak	Spacewatch	DOR	2.9 km	MPC · JPL
494322	2016 TO_{3}	—	September 24, 2005	Kitt Peak	Spacewatch	NYS	1.1 km	MPC · JPL
494323	2016 TQ_{3}	—	March 11, 1996	Kitt Peak	Spacewatch	·	3.3 km	MPC · JPL
494324	2016 TO_{9}	—	September 29, 2010	Mount Lemmon	Mount Lemmon Survey	·	3.5 km	MPC · JPL
494325	2016 TU_{9}	—	October 27, 2000	Socorro	LINEAR	·	2.6 km	MPC · JPL
494326	2016 TS_{11}	—	October 25, 2011	Haleakala	Pan-STARRS 1	·	2.1 km	MPC · JPL
494327	2016 TL_{13}	—	August 28, 2006	Kitt Peak	Spacewatch	·	1.9 km	MPC · JPL
494328	2016 TX_{13}	—	September 22, 2011	Kitt Peak	Spacewatch	·	2.6 km	MPC · JPL
494329	2016 TG_{14}	—	November 16, 2006	Mount Lemmon	Mount Lemmon Survey	·	2.9 km	MPC · JPL
494330	2016 TY_{16}	—	February 12, 2008	Kitt Peak	Spacewatch	·	1.7 km	MPC · JPL
494331	2016 TO_{22}	—	November 17, 2006	Kitt Peak	Spacewatch	·	4.6 km	MPC · JPL
494332	2016 TD_{25}	—	September 20, 2009	Kitt Peak	Spacewatch	·	740 m	MPC · JPL
494333	2016 TT_{29}	—	December 11, 2012	Mount Lemmon	Mount Lemmon Survey	·	1.9 km	MPC · JPL
494334	2016 TR_{30}	—	October 23, 2005	Catalina	CSS	·	1.4 km	MPC · JPL
494335	2016 TZ_{33}	—	December 11, 2006	Kitt Peak	Spacewatch	·	3.1 km	MPC · JPL
494336	2016 TJ_{34}	—	August 29, 2005	Kitt Peak	Spacewatch	EOS	1.6 km	MPC · JPL
494337	2016 TL_{35}	—	April 25, 2006	Mount Lemmon	Mount Lemmon Survey	·	3.0 km	MPC · JPL
494338	2016 TS_{36}	—	January 13, 2010	Mount Lemmon	Mount Lemmon Survey	V	580 m	MPC · JPL
494339	2016 TB_{43}	—	September 10, 2007	Mount Lemmon	Mount Lemmon Survey	·	1.7 km	MPC · JPL
494340	2016 TK_{43}	—	September 24, 2000	Kitt Peak	Spacewatch	·	1.6 km	MPC · JPL
494341	2016 TZ_{43}	—	March 27, 2014	Haleakala	Pan-STARRS 1	·	2.1 km	MPC · JPL
494342	2016 TQ_{46}	—	September 23, 2011	Kitt Peak	Spacewatch	·	2.1 km	MPC · JPL
494343	2016 TC_{47}	—	September 12, 2007	Mount Lemmon	Mount Lemmon Survey	·	1.3 km	MPC · JPL
494344	2016 TU_{48}	—	April 2, 2006	Mount Lemmon	Mount Lemmon Survey	·	1.9 km	MPC · JPL
494345	2016 TD_{54}	—	November 22, 2006	Mount Lemmon	Mount Lemmon Survey	EOS	1.6 km	MPC · JPL
494346	2016 TS_{57}	—	October 10, 2004	Kitt Peak	Spacewatch	·	900 m	MPC · JPL
494347	2016 TZ_{59}	—	August 13, 2012	Haleakala	Pan-STARRS 1	NYS	1.0 km	MPC · JPL
494348	2016 TZ_{63}	—	September 22, 2003	Kitt Peak	Spacewatch	·	1.2 km	MPC · JPL
494349	2016 TP_{64}	—	November 5, 1999	Socorro	LINEAR	·	1.7 km	MPC · JPL
494350	2016 TD_{70}	—	December 28, 1998	Kitt Peak	Spacewatch	·	2.2 km	MPC · JPL
494351	2016 TA_{74}	—	October 7, 2005	Kitt Peak	Spacewatch	·	2.6 km	MPC · JPL
494352	2016 TB_{74}	—	October 14, 1998	Kitt Peak	Spacewatch	·	1.5 km	MPC · JPL
494353	2016 TW_{76}	—	September 29, 2003	Kitt Peak	Spacewatch	·	1.3 km	MPC · JPL
494354	2016 TE_{78}	—	October 6, 1999	Socorro	LINEAR	·	1.3 km	MPC · JPL
494355	2016 TX_{79}	—	February 17, 2013	Kitt Peak	Spacewatch	·	2.6 km	MPC · JPL
494356	2016 TQ_{89}	—	October 29, 2005	Mount Lemmon	Mount Lemmon Survey	·	2.9 km	MPC · JPL
494357	2016 TN_{90}	—	January 20, 2009	Catalina	CSS	·	1.2 km	MPC · JPL
494358	2016 TY_{90}	—	September 28, 2006	Kitt Peak	Spacewatch	KOR	1.5 km	MPC · JPL
494359	2016 TT_{91}	—	September 25, 2005	Catalina	CSS	EOS	2.1 km	MPC · JPL
494360	2016 UO_{1}	—	November 17, 2006	Kitt Peak	Spacewatch	·	2.2 km	MPC · JPL
494361	2016 UG_{6}	—	October 24, 2011	Haleakala	Pan-STARRS 1	EOS	1.7 km	MPC · JPL
494362	2016 UX_{8}	—	December 26, 2006	Kitt Peak	Spacewatch	·	2.7 km	MPC · JPL
494363	2016 UB_{12}	—	April 4, 2008	Catalina	CSS	·	1.2 km	MPC · JPL
494364	2016 UD_{12}	—	October 22, 2012	Haleakala	Pan-STARRS 1	·	940 m	MPC · JPL
494365	2016 UJ_{16}	—	March 9, 2008	Mount Lemmon	Mount Lemmon Survey	EOS	1.8 km	MPC · JPL
494366	2016 UH_{20}	—	March 10, 2005	Mount Lemmon	Mount Lemmon Survey	·	640 m	MPC · JPL
494367	2016 UB_{23}	—	March 29, 2009	Kitt Peak	Spacewatch	·	1.5 km	MPC · JPL
494368	2016 UL_{23}	—	November 12, 1999	Socorro	LINEAR	·	950 m	MPC · JPL
494369	2016 UN_{23}	—	September 28, 2006	Mount Lemmon	Mount Lemmon Survey	·	620 m	MPC · JPL
494370	2016 UM_{25}	—	October 17, 2003	Kitt Peak	Spacewatch	·	1.6 km	MPC · JPL
494371	2016 UC_{27}	—	January 1, 2009	XuYi	PMO NEO Survey Program	·	1.5 km	MPC · JPL
494372	2016 UV_{27}	—	September 30, 2006	Mount Lemmon	Mount Lemmon Survey	·	1.9 km	MPC · JPL
494373	2016 UQ_{28}	—	March 6, 2008	Mount Lemmon	Mount Lemmon Survey	·	3.5 km	MPC · JPL
494374	2016 UZ_{28}	—	December 27, 2006	Mount Lemmon	Mount Lemmon Survey	·	2.3 km	MPC · JPL
494375	2016 UU_{30}	—	September 15, 2010	Mount Lemmon	Mount Lemmon Survey	·	3.0 km	MPC · JPL
494376	2016 UC_{33}	—	September 29, 2005	Kitt Peak	Spacewatch	·	3.2 km	MPC · JPL
494377	2016 UT_{33}	—	October 4, 1999	Kitt Peak	Spacewatch	·	1.1 km	MPC · JPL
494378	2016 UV_{34}	—	October 18, 2006	Kitt Peak	Spacewatch	·	1.8 km	MPC · JPL
494379	2016 UM_{39}	—	October 26, 2009	Kitt Peak	Spacewatch	·	910 m	MPC · JPL
494380	2016 UW_{42}	—	September 10, 2010	Mount Lemmon	Mount Lemmon Survey	·	2.7 km	MPC · JPL
494381	2016 UQ_{43}	—	December 12, 1998	Kitt Peak	Spacewatch	·	870 m	MPC · JPL
494382	2016 UU_{45}	—	November 6, 2005	Mount Lemmon	Mount Lemmon Survey	·	2.6 km	MPC · JPL
494383	2016 UJ_{46}	—	October 20, 2006	Kitt Peak	Spacewatch	·	760 m	MPC · JPL
494384	2016 UR_{47}	—	August 31, 2005	Kitt Peak	Spacewatch	EOS	1.5 km	MPC · JPL
494385	2016 UV_{47}	—	November 19, 2006	Kitt Peak	Spacewatch	·	2.9 km	MPC · JPL
494386	2016 UE_{48}	—	October 13, 2005	Kitt Peak	Spacewatch	·	2.4 km	MPC · JPL
494387	2016 UH_{48}	—	September 27, 2005	Kitt Peak	Spacewatch	·	2.0 km	MPC · JPL
494388	2016 UK_{48}	—	November 8, 2009	Mount Lemmon	Mount Lemmon Survey	·	820 m	MPC · JPL
494389	2016 UR_{49}	—	December 16, 1995	Kitt Peak	Spacewatch	·	1.1 km	MPC · JPL
494390	2016 UM_{50}	—	October 30, 2011	Mount Lemmon	Mount Lemmon Survey	·	2.1 km	MPC · JPL
494391	2016 UF_{51}	—	April 5, 2014	Haleakala	Pan-STARRS 1	·	1.6 km	MPC · JPL
494392	2016 UQ_{51}	—	May 12, 2010	Kitt Peak	Spacewatch	(5)	1.2 km	MPC · JPL
494393	2016 UJ_{52}	—	May 13, 2005	Mount Lemmon	Mount Lemmon Survey	·	2.2 km	MPC · JPL
494394	2016 UR_{53}	—	September 17, 2006	Kitt Peak	Spacewatch	·	440 m	MPC · JPL
494395	2016 UB_{54}	—	August 21, 2004	Siding Spring	SSS	·	1.3 km	MPC · JPL
494396	2016 UM_{55}	—	December 18, 2007	Mount Lemmon	Mount Lemmon Survey	·	1.7 km	MPC · JPL
494397	2016 UP_{56}	—	August 20, 2011	Haleakala	Pan-STARRS 1	·	1.6 km	MPC · JPL
494398	2016 UE_{58}	—	September 12, 1994	Kitt Peak	Spacewatch	·	1.6 km	MPC · JPL
494399	2016 UT_{58}	—	March 1, 2008	Kitt Peak	Spacewatch	EOS	1.9 km	MPC · JPL
494400	2016 UU_{58}	—	April 11, 2008	Mount Lemmon	Mount Lemmon Survey	·	2.4 km	MPC · JPL

== 494401–494500 ==
back to top

Designation			Discovery			Properties		Ref
Permanent	Provisional	Named after	Date	Site	Discoverer(s)	Category	Diam.	Ref
494401	2016 UA_{59}	—	September 30, 2009	Mount Lemmon	Mount Lemmon Survey	V	620 m	MPC · JPL
494402	2016 UB_{59}	—	July 5, 2005	Kitt Peak	Spacewatch	EOS	1.7 km	MPC · JPL
494403	2016 UC_{59}	—	December 26, 2011	Mount Lemmon	Mount Lemmon Survey	·	2.4 km	MPC · JPL
494404	2016 UF_{59}	—	November 12, 2005	Kitt Peak	Spacewatch	·	3.4 km	MPC · JPL
494405	2016 UQ_{59}	—	November 6, 2008	Kitt Peak	Spacewatch	(5)	1.4 km	MPC · JPL
494406	2016 UZ_{59}	—	October 10, 2005	Kitt Peak	Spacewatch	·	2.4 km	MPC · JPL
494407	2016 UZ_{60}	—	November 26, 2009	Mount Lemmon	Mount Lemmon Survey	·	1.2 km	MPC · JPL
494408	2016 UQ_{62}	—	October 22, 2005	Catalina	CSS	·	3.0 km	MPC · JPL
494409	2016 UG_{64}	—	April 19, 2007	Mount Lemmon	Mount Lemmon Survey	·	1.2 km	MPC · JPL
494410	2016 UJ_{64}	—	March 26, 2011	Mount Lemmon	Mount Lemmon Survey	·	1.3 km	MPC · JPL
494411	2016 UV_{69}	—	October 22, 2012	Haleakala	Pan-STARRS 1	MAR	990 m	MPC · JPL
494412	2016 UA_{70}	—	September 28, 2003	Kitt Peak	Spacewatch	·	1.4 km	MPC · JPL
494413	2016 UB_{70}	—	September 23, 2005	Kitt Peak	Spacewatch	·	2.2 km	MPC · JPL
494414	2016 US_{72}	—	December 25, 2005	Kitt Peak	Spacewatch	·	780 m	MPC · JPL
494415	2016 UX_{72}	—	October 18, 2011	Mount Lemmon	Mount Lemmon Survey	·	1.6 km	MPC · JPL
494416	2016 UB_{73}	—	April 10, 2010	Mount Lemmon	Mount Lemmon Survey	DOR	2.2 km	MPC · JPL
494417	2016 UF_{74}	—	November 28, 2011	Mount Lemmon	Mount Lemmon Survey	·	2.2 km	MPC · JPL
494418	2016 UW_{74}	—	September 4, 2000	Kitt Peak	Spacewatch	·	1.7 km	MPC · JPL
494419	2016 UP_{75}	—	May 22, 2011	Mount Lemmon	Mount Lemmon Survey	·	780 m	MPC · JPL
494420	2016 UR_{75}	—	December 10, 2005	Kitt Peak	Spacewatch	·	1.0 km	MPC · JPL
494421	2016 US_{75}	—	September 30, 2005	Mount Lemmon	Mount Lemmon Survey	·	3.0 km	MPC · JPL
494422	2016 UM_{81}	—	September 20, 2001	Socorro	LINEAR	·	870 m	MPC · JPL
494423	2016 UO_{81}	—	September 30, 2005	Kitt Peak	Spacewatch	·	2.3 km	MPC · JPL
494424	2016 UK_{82}	—	September 17, 2006	Kitt Peak	Spacewatch	·	1.8 km	MPC · JPL
494425	2016 UQ_{83}	—	November 18, 2003	Kitt Peak	Spacewatch	EUN	900 m	MPC · JPL
494426	2016 UW_{83}	—	February 13, 2004	Kitt Peak	Spacewatch	·	1.8 km	MPC · JPL
494427	2016 UO_{84}	—	October 18, 2009	Mount Lemmon	Mount Lemmon Survey	·	610 m	MPC · JPL
494428	2016 UW_{84}	—	November 7, 2012	Kitt Peak	Spacewatch	(5)	1.0 km	MPC · JPL
494429	2016 UK_{85}	—	October 17, 2007	Mount Lemmon	Mount Lemmon Survey	·	1.7 km	MPC · JPL
494430	2016 UD_{86}	—	October 11, 2005	Kitt Peak	Spacewatch	·	2.0 km	MPC · JPL
494431	2016 UR_{88}	—	October 20, 2003	Kitt Peak	Spacewatch	EUN	1.1 km	MPC · JPL
494432	2016 UE_{89}	—	April 3, 2008	Mount Lemmon	Mount Lemmon Survey	V	460 m	MPC · JPL
494433	2016 UM_{89}	—	September 15, 2010	Mount Lemmon	Mount Lemmon Survey	·	2.4 km	MPC · JPL
494434	2016 UL_{90}	—	April 20, 2009	Mount Lemmon	Mount Lemmon Survey	EOS	2.2 km	MPC · JPL
494435	2016 UT_{90}	—	April 18, 2009	Mount Lemmon	Mount Lemmon Survey	·	1.8 km	MPC · JPL
494436	2016 UV_{90}	—	September 29, 1994	Kitt Peak	Spacewatch	·	1.9 km	MPC · JPL
494437	2016 UW_{90}	—	October 20, 2011	Mount Lemmon	Mount Lemmon Survey	·	1.9 km	MPC · JPL
494438	2016 US_{93}	—	September 28, 2003	Kitt Peak	Spacewatch	·	1.6 km	MPC · JPL
494439	2016 UP_{96}	—	August 31, 2005	Kitt Peak	Spacewatch	·	980 m	MPC · JPL
494440	2016 UJ_{104}	—	January 1, 2009	Kitt Peak	Spacewatch	·	1.3 km	MPC · JPL
494441	2016 UQ_{104}	—	June 29, 2005	Kitt Peak	Spacewatch	NYS	640 m	MPC · JPL
494442	2016 UY_{112}	—	March 11, 2007	Mount Lemmon	Mount Lemmon Survey	·	1.1 km	MPC · JPL
494443	2016 UG_{116}	—	November 15, 2011	Mount Lemmon	Mount Lemmon Survey	EOS	1.5 km	MPC · JPL
494444	2016 UC_{117}	—	June 7, 2011	Kitt Peak	Spacewatch	·	1.2 km	MPC · JPL
494445	2016 UW_{118}	—	March 12, 2008	Mount Lemmon	Mount Lemmon Survey	·	3.2 km	MPC · JPL
494446	2016 UT_{121}	—	January 17, 2007	Kitt Peak	Spacewatch	THM	1.7 km	MPC · JPL
494447	2016 UD_{138}	—	October 8, 2012	Mount Lemmon	Mount Lemmon Survey	·	880 m	MPC · JPL
494448	2016 UO_{142}	—	September 16, 2010	Mount Lemmon	Mount Lemmon Survey	·	2.7 km	MPC · JPL
494449	2016 UP_{142}	—	June 25, 2010	WISE	WISE	·	2.8 km	MPC · JPL
494450	2016 UY_{142}	—	October 9, 1997	Kitt Peak	Spacewatch	·	1.3 km	MPC · JPL
494451	2016 UC_{143}	—	November 2, 2005	Mount Lemmon	Mount Lemmon Survey	·	2.9 km	MPC · JPL
494452	2016 UF_{143}	—	February 19, 2012	Catalina	CSS	H	380 m	MPC · JPL
494453	2016 UD_{144}	—	September 15, 2010	Mount Lemmon	Mount Lemmon Survey	VER	2.5 km	MPC · JPL
494454	2016 UW_{145}	—	December 17, 2007	Mount Lemmon	Mount Lemmon Survey	·	2.1 km	MPC · JPL
494455	2016 UB_{146}	—	October 24, 2007	Mount Lemmon	Mount Lemmon Survey	AGN	1.2 km	MPC · JPL
494456	2016 UU_{146}	—	December 11, 2006	Kitt Peak	Spacewatch	EOS	1.7 km	MPC · JPL
494457	2016 VY_{7}	—	April 29, 2003	Kitt Peak	Spacewatch	·	1.2 km	MPC · JPL
494458	2016 VH_{9}	—	October 12, 2005	Kitt Peak	Spacewatch	·	3.1 km	MPC · JPL
494459	2016 VQ_{9}	—	October 21, 2003	Kitt Peak	Spacewatch	·	1.1 km	MPC · JPL
494460	2016 VA_{11}	—	November 24, 2011	Mount Lemmon	Mount Lemmon Survey	EOS	1.9 km	MPC · JPL
494461	2016 VF_{11}	—	December 4, 2008	Kitt Peak	Spacewatch	·	930 m	MPC · JPL
494462	2016 VJ_{12}	—	September 25, 1995	Kitt Peak	Spacewatch	·	1.0 km	MPC · JPL
494463	2016 VS_{15}	—	October 15, 2012	Mount Lemmon	Mount Lemmon Survey	EUN	1.3 km	MPC · JPL
494464	2016 VZ_{15}	—	November 6, 2012	Mount Lemmon	Mount Lemmon Survey	EUN	1.1 km	MPC · JPL
494465	2016 WH_{4}	—	April 2, 2005	Mount Lemmon	Mount Lemmon Survey	·	780 m	MPC · JPL
494466	2016 WD_{5}	—	September 29, 1994	Kitt Peak	Spacewatch	·	910 m	MPC · JPL
494467	2016 WM_{5}	—	April 3, 2009	Mount Lemmon	Mount Lemmon Survey	·	1.8 km	MPC · JPL
494468	2016 WU_{10}	—	March 8, 2005	Mount Lemmon	Mount Lemmon Survey	·	770 m	MPC · JPL
494469	2016 WV_{10}	—	November 22, 2005	Kitt Peak	Spacewatch	THM	1.9 km	MPC · JPL
494470	2016 WK_{11}	—	September 19, 2006	Catalina	CSS	·	2.9 km	MPC · JPL
494471	2016 WF_{12}	—	October 24, 2009	Kitt Peak	Spacewatch	·	750 m	MPC · JPL
494472	2016 WM_{12}	—	October 3, 1997	Caussols	ODAS	·	1.0 km	MPC · JPL
494473	2016 WJ_{13}	—	November 17, 2006	Kitt Peak	Spacewatch	·	700 m	MPC · JPL
494474	2016 WL_{13}	—	October 25, 2008	Kitt Peak	Spacewatch	·	1.3 km	MPC · JPL
494475	2016 WJ_{18}	—	October 21, 2011	Mount Lemmon	Mount Lemmon Survey	·	1.8 km	MPC · JPL
494476	2016 WC_{19}	—	October 18, 2007	Mount Lemmon	Mount Lemmon Survey	·	1.3 km	MPC · JPL
494477	2016 WC_{22}	—	July 5, 2010	Kitt Peak	Spacewatch	·	2.4 km	MPC · JPL
494478	2016 WL_{22}	—	November 19, 2003	Kitt Peak	Spacewatch	·	1.2 km	MPC · JPL
494479	2016 WQ_{23}	—	November 12, 2009	La Sagra	OAM	·	830 m	MPC · JPL
494480	2016 WV_{24}	—	February 4, 2010	WISE	WISE	PHO	1.1 km	MPC · JPL
494481	2016 WF_{25}	—	November 25, 2009	Kitt Peak	Spacewatch	·	800 m	MPC · JPL
494482	2016 WG_{27}	—	September 18, 2010	Mount Lemmon	Mount Lemmon Survey	EOS	2.1 km	MPC · JPL
494483	2016 WH_{27}	—	January 17, 2013	Mount Lemmon	Mount Lemmon Survey	EUN	1.1 km	MPC · JPL
494484	2016 WX_{32}	—	May 22, 2010	WISE	WISE	T_{j} (2.97)	2.6 km	MPC · JPL
494485	2016 WG_{33}	—	August 28, 2005	Kitt Peak	Spacewatch	·	3.1 km	MPC · JPL
494486	2016 WB_{34}	—	June 19, 2015	Mount Lemmon	Mount Lemmon Survey	·	1.9 km	MPC · JPL
494487	2016 WY_{35}	—	July 21, 2010	WISE	WISE	·	2.7 km	MPC · JPL
494488	2016 WF_{39}	—	November 5, 2012	Kitt Peak	Spacewatch	·	1.0 km	MPC · JPL
494489	2016 WR_{41}	—	September 10, 2007	Mount Lemmon	Mount Lemmon Survey	·	1.5 km	MPC · JPL
494490	2016 WL_{42}	—	December 22, 1998	Kitt Peak	Spacewatch	·	2.6 km	MPC · JPL
494491	2016 WQ_{43}	—	March 17, 2005	Mount Lemmon	Mount Lemmon Survey	AGN	1.5 km	MPC · JPL
494492	2016 WV_{43}	—	September 30, 2011	Kitt Peak	Spacewatch	·	1.7 km	MPC · JPL
494493	2016 WN_{45}	—	January 3, 2013	Catalina	CSS	·	1.4 km	MPC · JPL
494494	2016 WP_{45}	—	October 27, 2006	Mount Lemmon	Mount Lemmon Survey	·	3.0 km	MPC · JPL
494495	2016 WZ_{45}	—	December 8, 2012	Catalina	CSS	·	1.1 km	MPC · JPL
494496	2016 WQ_{46}	—	November 5, 2007	Kitt Peak	Spacewatch	·	2.0 km	MPC · JPL
494497	2016 WV_{47}	—	November 8, 2008	Mount Lemmon	Mount Lemmon Survey	(5)	1.5 km	MPC · JPL
494498	2016 WU_{49}	—	October 5, 2005	Kitt Peak	Spacewatch	·	2.6 km	MPC · JPL
494499	2016 WZ_{49}	—	October 29, 2005	Mount Lemmon	Mount Lemmon Survey	·	1.0 km	MPC · JPL
494500	2016 WL_{50}	—	October 29, 2003	Kitt Peak	Spacewatch	·	1.0 km	MPC · JPL

== 494501–494600 ==
back to top

Designation			Discovery			Properties		Ref
Permanent	Provisional	Named after	Date	Site	Discoverer(s)	Category	Diam.	Ref
494501	2016 WO_{50}	—	January 12, 2008	Kitt Peak	Spacewatch	·	1.8 km	MPC · JPL
494502	2016 WV_{50}	—	December 6, 2012	Mount Lemmon	Mount Lemmon Survey	·	1.4 km	MPC · JPL
494503	2016 WO_{53}	—	September 15, 2012	Catalina	CSS	NYS	970 m	MPC · JPL
494504	2016 WU_{54}	—	April 4, 2008	Kitt Peak	Spacewatch	·	610 m	MPC · JPL
494505	2016 WE_{55}	—	July 5, 2011	Haleakala	Pan-STARRS 1	·	1.5 km	MPC · JPL
494506	2016 WH_{55}	—	November 23, 2012	Catalina	CSS	·	1.4 km	MPC · JPL
494507	2016 XY	—	January 4, 2013	Mount Lemmon	Mount Lemmon Survey	·	1.2 km	MPC · JPL
494508	2016 XG_{5}	—	November 30, 2003	Kitt Peak	Spacewatch	·	660 m	MPC · JPL
494509	2016 XS_{9}	—	October 21, 2006	Kitt Peak	Spacewatch	·	2.2 km	MPC · JPL
494510	2016 XT_{9}	—	December 26, 2011	Mount Lemmon	Mount Lemmon Survey	·	2.1 km	MPC · JPL
494511	2016 XN_{15}	—	October 25, 2011	Haleakala	Pan-STARRS 1	·	2.2 km	MPC · JPL
494512	2016 XS_{22}	—	December 29, 2003	Anderson Mesa	LONEOS	·	1.3 km	MPC · JPL
494513	2016 XY_{22}	—	March 3, 2006	Kitt Peak	Spacewatch	NYS	1.2 km	MPC · JPL
494514	2016 YP_{8}	—	February 21, 2006	Catalina	CSS	H	660 m	MPC · JPL
494515	2016 YQ_{9}	—	January 7, 2000	Socorro	LINEAR	·	4.7 km	MPC · JPL
494516	2016 YM_{10}	—	February 2, 2006	Mount Lemmon	Mount Lemmon Survey	·	1.4 km	MPC · JPL
494517	2016 YN_{10}	—	December 22, 2005	Socorro	LINEAR	PHO	1.1 km	MPC · JPL
494518	2016 YA_{11}	—	December 28, 2011	Catalina	CSS	H	630 m	MPC · JPL
494519	2016 YD_{11}	—	January 4, 2003	Socorro	LINEAR	PHO	1.6 km	MPC · JPL
494520	2016 YN_{12}	—	October 9, 2008	Mount Lemmon	Mount Lemmon Survey	·	1.3 km	MPC · JPL
494521	2016 YT_{12}	—	August 17, 2009	Kitt Peak	Spacewatch	ELF	3.8 km	MPC · JPL
494522	2016 YU_{12}	—	July 16, 2007	Siding Spring	SSS	·	1.8 km	MPC · JPL
494523	2016 YX_{12}	—	October 15, 2004	Mount Lemmon	Mount Lemmon Survey	·	3.0 km	MPC · JPL
494524	2016 YE_{13}	—	February 2, 2009	Mount Lemmon	Mount Lemmon Survey	EUN	1.2 km	MPC · JPL
494525	2017 AU	—	September 23, 2009	Mount Lemmon	Mount Lemmon Survey	·	4.6 km	MPC · JPL
494526	2017 AO_{2}	—	August 28, 2014	Haleakala	Pan-STARRS 1	·	3.5 km	MPC · JPL
494527	2017 AS_{5}	—	October 10, 2008	Mount Lemmon	Mount Lemmon Survey	·	1.4 km	MPC · JPL
494528	2017 AA_{6}	—	January 7, 2000	Socorro	LINEAR	T_{j} (2.94)	3.8 km	MPC · JPL
494529	2017 AN_{6}	—	January 8, 2010	Kitt Peak	Spacewatch	·	870 m	MPC · JPL
494530	2017 AF_{7}	—	February 16, 2004	Kitt Peak	Spacewatch	·	2.3 km	MPC · JPL
494531	2017 AU_{11}	—	October 1, 2005	Mount Lemmon	Mount Lemmon Survey	V	580 m	MPC · JPL
494532	2017 AB_{12}	—	October 25, 2005	Kitt Peak	Spacewatch	·	990 m	MPC · JPL
494533	2017 AO_{12}	—	November 16, 2009	Mount Lemmon	Mount Lemmon Survey	·	680 m	MPC · JPL
494534	2017 AT_{12}	—	January 7, 2010	Kitt Peak	Spacewatch	·	790 m	MPC · JPL
494535	2017 AV_{12}	—	November 7, 2007	Mount Lemmon	Mount Lemmon Survey	·	2.2 km	MPC · JPL
494536	2017 AW_{12}	—	January 23, 2006	Kitt Peak	Spacewatch	·	3.2 km	MPC · JPL
494537	2017 AJ_{14}	—	May 2, 2009	Mount Lemmon	Mount Lemmon Survey	·	2.6 km	MPC · JPL
494538	2017 AN_{14}	—	October 15, 2007	Catalina	CSS	·	1.8 km	MPC · JPL
494539	2017 AA_{15}	—	December 7, 2005	Kitt Peak	Spacewatch	·	1.2 km	MPC · JPL
494540	2017 AD_{15}	—	February 1, 2009	Kitt Peak	Spacewatch	·	1.2 km	MPC · JPL
494541	2017 AE_{17}	—	March 12, 2007	Catalina	CSS	·	1.0 km	MPC · JPL
494542	2017 AF_{17}	—	January 23, 2006	Kitt Peak	Spacewatch	MAS	520 m	MPC · JPL
494543	2017 AX_{17}	—	November 2, 2007	Kitt Peak	Spacewatch	·	1.4 km	MPC · JPL
494544	2017 AB_{18}	—	October 7, 2012	Haleakala	Pan-STARRS 1	·	910 m	MPC · JPL
494545	2017 AL_{20}	—	October 16, 2007	Mount Lemmon	Mount Lemmon Survey	·	1.3 km	MPC · JPL
494546	2017 BZ_{1}	—	September 7, 2004	Kitt Peak	Spacewatch	·	2.9 km	MPC · JPL
494547	2017 BY_{3}	—	April 21, 2012	Haleakala	Pan-STARRS 1	·	3.5 km	MPC · JPL
494548	2017 BZ_{3}	—	January 5, 2006	Mount Lemmon	Mount Lemmon Survey	·	1.4 km	MPC · JPL
494549	2017 BN_{5}	—	December 14, 1999	Socorro	LINEAR	H	740 m	MPC · JPL
494550	2017 BF_{6}	—	March 14, 2012	Haleakala	Pan-STARRS 1	H	590 m	MPC · JPL
494551	2017 BO_{7}	—	August 27, 2006	Kitt Peak	Spacewatch	·	2.2 km	MPC · JPL
494552	2017 BR_{7}	—	January 28, 2006	Catalina	CSS	·	4.1 km	MPC · JPL
494553	2017 BY_{7}	—	July 25, 2015	Haleakala	Pan-STARRS 1	JUN	900 m	MPC · JPL
494554	2017 BB_{8}	—	December 14, 2004	Socorro	LINEAR	·	3.2 km	MPC · JPL
494555	2017 BF_{8}	—	October 25, 2005	Kitt Peak	Spacewatch	·	1.0 km	MPC · JPL
494556	2017 BH_{8}	—	March 16, 2004	Kitt Peak	Spacewatch	·	870 m	MPC · JPL
494557	2017 BO_{8}	—	January 31, 2008	Catalina	CSS	·	2.1 km	MPC · JPL
494558	2017 BQ_{8}	—	April 22, 2007	Mount Lemmon	Mount Lemmon Survey	·	4.0 km	MPC · JPL
494559	2017 BT_{8}	—	March 15, 2007	Catalina	CSS	·	930 m	MPC · JPL
494560	2017 BW_{8}	—	November 2, 2011	Mount Lemmon	Mount Lemmon Survey	·	2.3 km	MPC · JPL
494561	2017 BD_{9}	—	September 17, 2009	Mount Lemmon	Mount Lemmon Survey	·	2.7 km	MPC · JPL
494562	2017 BL_{9}	—	January 28, 2004	Socorro	LINEAR	JUN	1.1 km	MPC · JPL
494563	2017 BA_{10}	—	March 5, 2013	Haleakala	Pan-STARRS 1	·	1.8 km	MPC · JPL
494564	2017 BF_{11}	—	May 1, 2003	Kitt Peak	Spacewatch	·	1.1 km	MPC · JPL
494565	2017 BD_{12}	—	December 15, 2004	Kitt Peak	Spacewatch	THM	3.1 km	MPC · JPL
494566	2017 BL_{12}	—	January 26, 2003	Kitt Peak	Spacewatch	·	3.0 km	MPC · JPL
494567	2017 BX_{14}	—	August 29, 2006	Catalina	CSS	·	1.9 km	MPC · JPL
494568	2017 BA_{18}	—	March 6, 2003	Anderson Mesa	LONEOS	·	790 m	MPC · JPL
494569	2017 BN_{24}	—	September 13, 2007	Kitt Peak	Spacewatch	(5)	1.1 km	MPC · JPL
494570	2017 BB_{28}	—	November 20, 2007	Mount Lemmon	Mount Lemmon Survey	KON	2.4 km	MPC · JPL
494571	2017 BL_{28}	—	January 22, 2006	Mount Lemmon	Mount Lemmon Survey	·	1.2 km	MPC · JPL
494572	2017 BZ_{28}	—	February 27, 2006	Mount Lemmon	Mount Lemmon Survey	T_{j} (2.92)	4.2 km	MPC · JPL
494573	2017 BN_{33}	—	August 28, 2011	Haleakala	Pan-STARRS 1	·	1.1 km	MPC · JPL
494574	2017 BD_{35}	—	February 2, 2006	Kitt Peak	Spacewatch	·	1.5 km	MPC · JPL
494575	2017 BX_{35}	—	February 29, 2008	Kitt Peak	Spacewatch	KOR	1.7 km	MPC · JPL
494576	2017 BY_{37}	—	January 28, 2006	Kitt Peak	Spacewatch	NYS	1.0 km	MPC · JPL
494577	2017 BD_{38}	—	November 3, 2011	Catalina	CSS	·	2.8 km	MPC · JPL
494578	2017 BX_{41}	—	December 19, 2009	Mount Lemmon	Mount Lemmon Survey	·	960 m	MPC · JPL
494579	2017 BB_{47}	—	March 26, 2004	Kitt Peak	Spacewatch	·	1.8 km	MPC · JPL
494580	2017 BQ_{54}	—	October 7, 2008	Kitt Peak	Spacewatch	·	860 m	MPC · JPL
494581	2017 BC_{58}	—	January 8, 2007	Mount Lemmon	Mount Lemmon Survey	·	750 m	MPC · JPL
494582	2017 BM_{59}	—	January 17, 2013	Haleakala	Pan-STARRS 1	·	1.5 km	MPC · JPL
494583	2017 BE_{64}	—	October 3, 2005	Kitt Peak	Spacewatch	·	760 m	MPC · JPL
494584	2017 BH_{65}	—	January 27, 2006	Catalina	CSS	·	3.2 km	MPC · JPL
494585	2017 BF_{68}	—	November 30, 2005	Mount Lemmon	Mount Lemmon Survey	V	680 m	MPC · JPL
494586	2017 BW_{73}	—	October 27, 2005	Kitt Peak	Spacewatch	·	670 m	MPC · JPL
494587	2017 BK_{85}	—	November 17, 2011	Mount Lemmon	Mount Lemmon Survey	·	2.3 km	MPC · JPL
494588	2017 BU_{87}	—	August 21, 2006	Kitt Peak	Spacewatch	·	1.9 km	MPC · JPL
494589	2017 BH_{88}	—	February 2, 2006	Mount Lemmon	Mount Lemmon Survey	·	1.3 km	MPC · JPL
494590	2017 BU_{89}	—	February 18, 2010	Mount Lemmon	Mount Lemmon Survey	·	1.1 km	MPC · JPL
494591	2017 BD_{94}	—	September 18, 2003	Kitt Peak	Spacewatch	·	1.4 km	MPC · JPL
494592	2017 BQ_{101}	—	July 30, 2008	Kitt Peak	Spacewatch	·	3.9 km	MPC · JPL
494593	2017 BL_{102}	—	October 31, 2008	Mount Lemmon	Mount Lemmon Survey	·	1.0 km	MPC · JPL
494594	2017 BP_{102}	—	April 4, 2008	Mount Lemmon	Mount Lemmon Survey	BRA	1.6 km	MPC · JPL
494595	2017 BR_{102}	—	July 28, 2011	Siding Spring	SSS	·	1.5 km	MPC · JPL
494596	2017 BK_{107}	—	October 3, 2008	Mount Lemmon	Mount Lemmon Survey	PHO	980 m	MPC · JPL
494597	2017 BY_{109}	—	March 13, 2007	Mount Lemmon	Mount Lemmon Survey	·	1.9 km	MPC · JPL
494598	2017 BA_{110}	—	December 5, 2005	Mount Lemmon	Mount Lemmon Survey	·	3.8 km	MPC · JPL
494599	2017 BJ_{111}	—	September 5, 2010	Mount Lemmon	Mount Lemmon Survey	EUN	1.5 km	MPC · JPL
494600	2017 BS_{111}	—	December 26, 2011	Mount Lemmon	Mount Lemmon Survey	·	1.5 km	MPC · JPL

== 494601–494700 ==
back to top

Designation			Discovery			Properties		Ref
Permanent	Provisional	Named after	Date	Site	Discoverer(s)	Category	Diam.	Ref
494601	2017 BU_{111}	—	December 30, 2008	Kitt Peak	Spacewatch	·	930 m	MPC · JPL
494602	2017 BQ_{112}	—	October 4, 2006	Mount Lemmon	Mount Lemmon Survey	·	2.1 km	MPC · JPL
494603	2017 BB_{114}	—	February 13, 2009	Catalina	CSS	MAR	1.3 km	MPC · JPL
494604	2017 BL_{116}	—	December 15, 2004	Kitt Peak	Spacewatch	·	1.3 km	MPC · JPL
494605	2017 BG_{121}	—	September 29, 2008	Mount Lemmon	Mount Lemmon Survey	·	3.6 km	MPC · JPL
494606	2017 BN_{122}	—	December 31, 1999	Kitt Peak	Spacewatch	·	2.6 km	MPC · JPL
494607	2017 BJ_{124}	—	December 18, 2007	Mount Lemmon	Mount Lemmon Survey	·	1.6 km	MPC · JPL
494608	2017 BS_{124}	—	September 11, 2004	Kitt Peak	Spacewatch	·	2.5 km	MPC · JPL
494609	2017 BU_{124}	—	November 11, 2007	Mount Lemmon	Mount Lemmon Survey	·	1.9 km	MPC · JPL
494610	2017 BV_{124}	—	April 20, 2007	Kitt Peak	Spacewatch	·	2.8 km	MPC · JPL
494611	2017 BJ_{125}	—	August 31, 1998	Kitt Peak	Spacewatch	JUN	790 m	MPC · JPL
494612	2017 BR_{129}	—	October 10, 1996	Kitt Peak	Spacewatch	·	1.8 km	MPC · JPL
494613	2017 BL_{132}	—	October 23, 2006	Mount Lemmon	Mount Lemmon Survey	HOF	2.3 km	MPC · JPL
494614	2017 BC_{133}	—	August 27, 2011	Haleakala	Pan-STARRS 1	·	990 m	MPC · JPL
494615	2017 BD_{133}	—	June 19, 2013	Haleakala	Pan-STARRS 1	·	2.9 km	MPC · JPL
494616	2017 BF_{133}	—	March 10, 2007	Mount Lemmon	Mount Lemmon Survey	·	1.7 km	MPC · JPL
494617	2017 BC_{135}	—	November 2, 2008	Mount Lemmon	Mount Lemmon Survey	V	580 m	MPC · JPL
494618	2017 CN	—	February 1, 2009	Catalina	CSS	H	470 m	MPC · JPL
494619	2017 CW_{2}	—	December 6, 2005	Mount Lemmon	Mount Lemmon Survey	·	1.7 km	MPC · JPL
494620	2017 CY_{2}	—	January 22, 2004	Socorro	LINEAR	·	600 m	MPC · JPL
494621	2017 CF_{3}	—	November 12, 2010	Mount Lemmon	Mount Lemmon Survey	·	2.5 km	MPC · JPL
494622	2017 CS_{3}	—	January 30, 2004	Anderson Mesa	LONEOS	·	1.6 km	MPC · JPL
494623	2017 CR_{4}	—	May 7, 2006	Kitt Peak	Spacewatch	·	1.7 km	MPC · JPL
494624	2017 CN_{7}	—	February 9, 2008	Mount Lemmon	Mount Lemmon Survey	·	2.1 km	MPC · JPL
494625	2017 CL_{10}	—	December 25, 2005	Kitt Peak	Spacewatch	·	2.1 km	MPC · JPL
494626	2017 CZ_{10}	—	July 25, 2015	Haleakala	Pan-STARRS 1	·	2.4 km	MPC · JPL
494627	2017 CC_{12}	—	January 19, 2013	Mount Lemmon	Mount Lemmon Survey	EUN	830 m	MPC · JPL
494628	2017 CU_{12}	—	September 28, 2008	Mount Lemmon	Mount Lemmon Survey	·	3.2 km	MPC · JPL
494629	2017 CP_{13}	—	February 2, 2006	Kitt Peak	Spacewatch	·	1.3 km	MPC · JPL
494630	2017 CW_{21}	—	January 17, 2007	Kitt Peak	Spacewatch	·	480 m	MPC · JPL
494631	2017 CN_{27}	—	October 10, 2007	Mount Lemmon	Mount Lemmon Survey	·	1.0 km	MPC · JPL
494632	2017 CB_{28}	—	March 26, 2007	Mount Lemmon	Mount Lemmon Survey	·	760 m	MPC · JPL
494633	2017 CP_{29}	—	February 12, 2008	Mount Lemmon	Mount Lemmon Survey	·	1.4 km	MPC · JPL
494634	2017 CF_{30}	—	January 10, 2008	Kitt Peak	Spacewatch	·	1.9 km	MPC · JPL
494635	2017 CO_{30}	—	January 20, 2010	WISE	WISE	·	2.7 km	MPC · JPL
494636	2017 DN_{7}	—	October 8, 2008	Catalina	CSS	CYB	5.2 km	MPC · JPL
494637	2017 DD_{9}	—	November 10, 2004	Kitt Peak	Spacewatch	·	4.4 km	MPC · JPL
494638	2017 DH_{12}	—	November 10, 2004	Kitt Peak	Spacewatch	·	1.4 km	MPC · JPL
494639	2017 DM_{31}	—	January 23, 2006	Kitt Peak	Spacewatch	·	3.2 km	MPC · JPL
494640	2017 DU_{31}	—	September 2, 2008	Kitt Peak	Spacewatch	·	1.1 km	MPC · JPL
494641	2017 DQ_{45}	—	August 22, 2004	Kitt Peak	Spacewatch	H	460 m	MPC · JPL
494642	2017 DG_{48}	—	February 25, 2006	Kitt Peak	Spacewatch	·	4.4 km	MPC · JPL
494643	2017 DU_{70}	—	August 27, 2009	Kitt Peak	Spacewatch	·	2.3 km	MPC · JPL
494644	2017 DE_{73}	—	March 14, 2004	Kitt Peak	Spacewatch	·	1.3 km	MPC · JPL
494645	2017 DE_{76}	—	March 14, 2004	Kitt Peak	Spacewatch	EUN	1.3 km	MPC · JPL
494646	2017 DS_{77}	—	May 1, 2006	Kitt Peak	Spacewatch	·	1.7 km	MPC · JPL
494647	2017 DX_{78}	—	September 23, 2008	Kitt Peak	Spacewatch	·	1.0 km	MPC · JPL
494648	2017 DH_{79}	—	March 5, 1994	Kitt Peak	Spacewatch	·	2.4 km	MPC · JPL
494649	2017 DJ_{79}	—	December 15, 2009	Mount Lemmon	Mount Lemmon Survey	·	770 m	MPC · JPL
494650	2017 DZ_{83}	—	February 20, 2006	Kitt Peak	Spacewatch	·	1.1 km	MPC · JPL
494651	2017 DF_{85}	—	April 9, 2002	Kitt Peak	Spacewatch	·	1.5 km	MPC · JPL
494652	2017 DM_{94}	—	January 11, 1999	Kitt Peak	Spacewatch	·	3.0 km	MPC · JPL
494653	2017 DH_{107}	—	December 24, 2005	Kitt Peak	Spacewatch	·	2.1 km	MPC · JPL
494654	1995 ST_{28}	—	September 20, 1995	Kitt Peak	Spacewatch	·	950 m	MPC · JPL
494655	1998 WX_{38}	—	November 15, 1998	Kitt Peak	Spacewatch	L4 · 006	10 km	MPC · JPL
494656	2000 CD_{127}	—	February 1, 2000	Kitt Peak	Spacewatch	EOS	1.6 km	MPC · JPL
494657	2000 TP_{40}	—	October 1, 2000	Socorro	LINEAR	·	1.9 km	MPC · JPL
494658	2000 UG_{11}	—	October 25, 2000	Socorro	LINEAR	APO · PHA · moon	260 m	MPC · JPL
494659	2000 YQ_{13}	—	December 21, 2000	Kitt Peak	Spacewatch	H	540 m	MPC · JPL
494660	2001 RP_{47}	—	September 12, 2001	Socorro	LINEAR	H	580 m	MPC · JPL
494661	2001 RO_{75}	—	September 10, 2001	Socorro	LINEAR	slow	1.4 km	MPC · JPL
494662	2001 RT_{100}	—	September 12, 2001	Socorro	LINEAR	·	1.3 km	MPC · JPL
494663	2001 SG_{117}	—	August 24, 2001	Anderson Mesa	LONEOS	·	730 m	MPC · JPL
494664	2001 TZ_{18}	—	August 19, 2001	Socorro	LINEAR	·	2.3 km	MPC · JPL
494665	2001 TQ_{84}	—	October 14, 2001	Socorro	LINEAR	·	1.1 km	MPC · JPL
494666	2001 UT_{31}	—	October 16, 2001	Socorro	LINEAR	·	1.3 km	MPC · JPL
494667	2001 WX_{1}	—	August 24, 2001	Socorro	LINEAR	T_{j} (2.66)	4.0 km	MPC · JPL
494668	2002 AH_{19}	—	December 9, 2001	Socorro	LINEAR	H	640 m	MPC · JPL
494669	2002 CG_{226}	—	December 19, 2001	Socorro	LINEAR	·	2.1 km	MPC · JPL
494670	2002 MQ_{1}	—	June 18, 2002	Socorro	LINEAR	·	640 m	MPC · JPL
494671	2002 QK_{81}	—	August 30, 2002	Palomar	NEAT	·	1.0 km	MPC · JPL
494672	2002 RE_{267}	—	September 14, 2002	Palomar	NEAT	·	2.0 km	MPC · JPL
494673	2002 SM_{61}	—	September 16, 2002	Palomar	NEAT	·	2.0 km	MPC · JPL
494674	2002 TC_{311}	—	October 4, 2002	Apache Point	SDSS	·	2.2 km	MPC · JPL
494675	2002 VX_{14}	—	November 6, 2002	Needville	Needville	T_{j} (2.95)	3.5 km	MPC · JPL
494676	2002 VD_{111}	—	November 6, 2002	Anderson Mesa	LONEOS	(18466)	2.6 km	MPC · JPL
494677	2003 SJ_{111}	—	September 18, 2003	Kitt Peak	Spacewatch	·	550 m	MPC · JPL
494678	2003 SQ_{116}	—	September 16, 2003	Kitt Peak	Spacewatch	·	1.4 km	MPC · JPL
494679	2003 SZ_{197}	—	September 21, 2003	Anderson Mesa	LONEOS	NYS	930 m	MPC · JPL
494680	2003 SC_{393}	—	September 26, 2003	Apache Point	SDSS	·	800 m	MPC · JPL
494681	2003 SE_{427}	—	September 16, 2003	Kitt Peak	Spacewatch	EOS	1.6 km	MPC · JPL
494682	2003 TJ_{54}	—	September 19, 2003	Campo Imperatore	CINEOS	EOS	1.8 km	MPC · JPL
494683	2003 WJ_{15}	—	October 19, 2003	Kitt Peak	Spacewatch	V	640 m	MPC · JPL
494684	2003 WO_{163}	—	November 30, 2003	Kitt Peak	Spacewatch	·	1.8 km	MPC · JPL
494685	2004 BK_{77}	—	January 22, 2004	Socorro	LINEAR	·	1.3 km	MPC · JPL
494686	2004 CD_{50}	—	February 12, 2004	Kitt Peak	Spacewatch	H	470 m	MPC · JPL
494687	2004 ED_{25}	—	March 15, 2004	Socorro	LINEAR	·	1.5 km	MPC · JPL
494688	2004 FN_{53}	—	March 17, 2004	Kitt Peak	Spacewatch	·	1.2 km	MPC · JPL
494689	2004 JR	—	May 9, 2004	Socorro	LINEAR	APO	600 m	MPC · JPL
494690	2004 JQ_{1}	—	May 11, 2004	Socorro	LINEAR	APO · PHA	340 m	MPC · JPL
494691	2004 MB_{2}	—	May 28, 2004	Kitt Peak	Spacewatch	·	1.5 km	MPC · JPL
494692	2004 PL_{26}	—	August 8, 2004	Bergisch Gladbach	W. Bickel	·	1.6 km	MPC · JPL
494693	2004 PT_{63}	—	August 10, 2004	Socorro	LINEAR	·	650 m	MPC · JPL
494694	2004 RS_{96}	—	September 8, 2004	Palomar	NEAT	·	1.5 km	MPC · JPL
494695	2004 RR_{328}	—	September 15, 2004	Anderson Mesa	LONEOS	·	680 m	MPC · JPL
494696	2004 RN_{335}	—	September 13, 2004	Palomar	NEAT	AMO	450 m	MPC · JPL
494697	2004 SW_{55}	—	September 24, 2004	Siding Spring	SSS	APO · PHA	250 m	MPC · JPL
494698	2004 TL_{13}	—	October 8, 2004	Socorro	LINEAR	·	2.8 km	MPC · JPL
494699	2004 TS_{92}	—	October 5, 2004	Kitt Peak	Spacewatch	BRA	1.4 km	MPC · JPL
494700	2004 TR_{100}	—	September 7, 2004	Socorro	LINEAR	·	1.6 km	MPC · JPL

== 494701–494800 ==
back to top

Designation			Discovery			Properties		Ref
Permanent	Provisional	Named after	Date	Site	Discoverer(s)	Category	Diam.	Ref
494701	2004 TF_{242}	—	October 8, 2004	Socorro	LINEAR	H	570 m	MPC · JPL
494702	2004 VK_{59}	—	November 9, 2004	Catalina	CSS	PHO	990 m	MPC · JPL
494703	2004 XN_{62}	—	December 14, 2004	Socorro	LINEAR	·	1.1 km	MPC · JPL
494704	2004 YK_{36}	—	December 21, 2004	Catalina	CSS	·	3.8 km	MPC · JPL
494705	2005 ED_{76}	—	March 3, 2005	Kitt Peak	Spacewatch	NYS	1.1 km	MPC · JPL
494706	2005 GL_{9}	—	April 3, 2005	Socorro	LINEAR	T_{j} (2.96) · APO +1km	1.6 km	MPC · JPL
494707	2005 GD_{219}	—	March 10, 2005	Catalina	CSS	·	1.1 km	MPC · JPL
494708	2005 JY_{74}	—	May 8, 2005	Anderson Mesa	LONEOS	·	1.1 km	MPC · JPL
494709	2005 LP_{19}	—	June 8, 2005	Kitt Peak	Spacewatch	·	930 m	MPC · JPL
494710	2005 MO_{13}	—	June 30, 2005	Catalina	CSS	ATE · PHA	250 m	MPC · JPL
494711	2005 NL_{85}	—	May 20, 2005	Mount Lemmon	Mount Lemmon Survey	·	940 m	MPC · JPL
494712	2005 NG_{122}	—	July 4, 2005	Kitt Peak	Spacewatch	·	1.1 km	MPC · JPL
494713	2005 OU_{2}	—	July 29, 2005	Siding Spring	SSS	APO	460 m	MPC · JPL
494714	2005 QS_{40}	—	August 26, 2005	Palomar	NEAT	·	1.3 km	MPC · JPL
494715	2005 QB_{82}	—	August 28, 2005	Anderson Mesa	LONEOS	·	590 m	MPC · JPL
494716	2005 SQ_{89}	—	September 24, 2005	Kitt Peak	Spacewatch	·	1.3 km	MPC · JPL
494717	2005 SE_{121}	—	September 29, 2005	Kitt Peak	Spacewatch	·	1.7 km	MPC · JPL
494718	2005 SF_{151}	—	September 25, 2005	Kitt Peak	Spacewatch	·	1.7 km	MPC · JPL
494719	2005 SD_{171}	—	September 29, 2005	Kitt Peak	Spacewatch	·	1.4 km	MPC · JPL
494720	2005 SM_{171}	—	September 29, 2005	Kitt Peak	Spacewatch	·	1.8 km	MPC · JPL
494721	2005 SO_{191}	—	September 23, 2005	Kitt Peak	Spacewatch	·	1.8 km	MPC · JPL
494722	2005 SD_{233}	—	September 30, 2005	Mount Lemmon	Mount Lemmon Survey	·	1.8 km	MPC · JPL
494723	2005 SA_{245}	—	September 30, 2005	Mount Lemmon	Mount Lemmon Survey	MAR	880 m	MPC · JPL
494724	2005 SX_{256}	—	September 22, 2005	Palomar	NEAT	·	1.5 km	MPC · JPL
494725	2005 SR_{289}	—	September 29, 2005	Mount Lemmon	Mount Lemmon Survey	·	590 m	MPC · JPL
494726	2005 TF_{3}	—	October 1, 2005	Socorro	LINEAR	·	1.3 km	MPC · JPL
494727	2005 TL_{183}	—	October 7, 2005	Anderson Mesa	LONEOS	·	2.2 km	MPC · JPL
494728	2005 UA_{5}	—	October 25, 2005	Kitt Peak	Spacewatch	·	1.7 km	MPC · JPL
494729	2005 UG_{38}	—	October 24, 2005	Kitt Peak	Spacewatch	·	2.4 km	MPC · JPL
494730	2005 UT_{50}	—	October 23, 2005	Catalina	CSS	·	2.0 km	MPC · JPL
494731	2005 UR_{74}	—	October 23, 2005	Palomar	NEAT	·	1.5 km	MPC · JPL
494732	2005 UV_{107}	—	October 22, 2005	Kitt Peak	Spacewatch	·	2.0 km	MPC · JPL
494733	2005 UF_{115}	—	October 23, 2005	Kitt Peak	Spacewatch	·	610 m	MPC · JPL
494734	2005 UC_{133}	—	October 25, 2005	Kitt Peak	Spacewatch	·	1.4 km	MPC · JPL
494735	2005 UA_{242}	—	October 25, 2005	Kitt Peak	Spacewatch	·	1.4 km	MPC · JPL
494736	2005 UC_{337}	—	September 30, 2005	Mount Lemmon	Mount Lemmon Survey	·	1.3 km	MPC · JPL
494737	2005 UP_{395}	—	October 1, 2005	Mount Lemmon	Mount Lemmon Survey	·	1.3 km	MPC · JPL
494738	2005 UC_{431}	—	October 28, 2005	Kitt Peak	Spacewatch	·	1.5 km	MPC · JPL
494739	2005 UA_{454}	—	October 30, 2005	Kitt Peak	Spacewatch	·	1.4 km	MPC · JPL
494740	2005 UA_{511}	—	October 26, 2005	Kitt Peak	Spacewatch	·	1.5 km	MPC · JPL
494741	2005 UP_{520}	—	October 26, 2005	Apache Point	A. C. Becker	·	1.3 km	MPC · JPL
494742	2005 VM	—	October 24, 2005	Kitt Peak	Spacewatch	H	520 m	MPC · JPL
494743	2005 VF_{17}	—	October 28, 2005	Catalina	CSS	·	2.0 km	MPC · JPL
494744	2005 VG_{60}	—	October 31, 2005	Mount Lemmon	Mount Lemmon Survey	·	630 m	MPC · JPL
494745	2005 VE_{84}	—	October 27, 2005	Kitt Peak	Spacewatch	·	1.2 km	MPC · JPL
494746	2005 WQ_{56}	—	October 30, 2005	Socorro	LINEAR	H	570 m	MPC · JPL
494747	2005 WG_{65}	—	October 25, 2005	Kitt Peak	Spacewatch	·	740 m	MPC · JPL
494748	2005 WU_{119}	—	November 29, 2005	Kitt Peak	Spacewatch	(1547)	1.6 km	MPC · JPL
494749	2005 WL_{172}	—	November 5, 2005	Kitt Peak	Spacewatch	·	2.1 km	MPC · JPL
494750	2005 WZ_{180}	—	November 1, 2005	Catalina	CSS	·	2.9 km	MPC · JPL
494751	2005 WG_{186}	—	November 29, 2005	Mount Lemmon	Mount Lemmon Survey	·	1.9 km	MPC · JPL
494752	2005 WJ_{197}	—	October 26, 2005	Kitt Peak	Spacewatch	·	1.5 km	MPC · JPL
494753	2005 YJ_{9}	—	December 21, 2005	Kitt Peak	Spacewatch	·	1.4 km	MPC · JPL
494754	2005 YU_{141}	—	December 28, 2005	Mount Lemmon	Mount Lemmon Survey	·	1.8 km	MPC · JPL
494755	2005 YR_{143}	—	December 28, 2005	Mount Lemmon	Mount Lemmon Survey	·	1.5 km	MPC · JPL
494756	2005 YE_{291}	—	December 25, 2005	Kitt Peak	Spacewatch	·	580 m	MPC · JPL
494757	2006 BZ_{92}	—	January 26, 2006	Kitt Peak	Spacewatch	·	1.2 km	MPC · JPL
494758	2006 BO_{108}	—	January 25, 2006	Kitt Peak	Spacewatch	(2076)	640 m	MPC · JPL
494759	2006 BH_{279}	—	January 23, 2006	Mount Lemmon	Mount Lemmon Survey	NYS	760 m	MPC · JPL
494760	2006 DX_{12}	—	December 6, 2005	Mount Lemmon	Mount Lemmon Survey	·	2.8 km	MPC · JPL
494761	2006 DE_{23}	—	February 20, 2006	Kitt Peak	Spacewatch	NYS	740 m	MPC · JPL
494762	2006 DX_{108}	—	February 25, 2006	Mount Lemmon	Mount Lemmon Survey	EOS	1.8 km	MPC · JPL
494763	2006 DD_{133}	—	February 25, 2006	Kitt Peak	Spacewatch	NYS	600 m	MPC · JPL
494764	2006 FU_{17}	—	March 23, 2006	Kitt Peak	Spacewatch	NYS	860 m	MPC · JPL
494765	2006 GU_{34}	—	April 7, 2006	Catalina	CSS	·	2.6 km	MPC · JPL
494766	2006 HH_{12}	—	April 19, 2006	Kitt Peak	Spacewatch	·	2.3 km	MPC · JPL
494767	2006 HQ_{26}	—	April 20, 2006	Kitt Peak	Spacewatch	EOS	1.9 km	MPC · JPL
494768	2006 HE_{73}	—	April 25, 2006	Kitt Peak	Spacewatch	·	740 m	MPC · JPL
494769	2006 HQ_{85}	—	April 27, 2006	Kitt Peak	Spacewatch	PHO	880 m	MPC · JPL
494770	2006 HM_{102}	—	April 30, 2006	Kitt Peak	Spacewatch	·	1.0 km	MPC · JPL
494771	2006 JG_{3}	—	May 2, 2006	Mount Lemmon	Mount Lemmon Survey	·	2.0 km	MPC · JPL
494772	2006 JD_{15}	—	April 2, 2006	Kitt Peak	Spacewatch	·	1.1 km	MPC · JPL
494773	2006 JE_{27}	—	May 1, 2006	Kitt Peak	Spacewatch	PHO	1.9 km	MPC · JPL
494774	2006 JF_{33}	—	April 25, 2006	Kitt Peak	Spacewatch	·	2.0 km	MPC · JPL
494775	2006 KL_{26}	—	May 20, 2006	Kitt Peak	Spacewatch	·	3.2 km	MPC · JPL
494776	2006 KS_{32}	—	May 20, 2006	Kitt Peak	Spacewatch	·	870 m	MPC · JPL
494777	2006 KN_{44}	—	May 21, 2006	Kitt Peak	Spacewatch	·	2.2 km	MPC · JPL
494778	2006 KX_{70}	—	May 4, 2006	Kitt Peak	Spacewatch	TIR	3.0 km	MPC · JPL
494779	2006 KC_{94}	—	May 7, 2006	Mount Lemmon	Mount Lemmon Survey	·	2.5 km	MPC · JPL
494780	2006 QN_{72}	—	August 21, 2006	Kitt Peak	Spacewatch	·	1.4 km	MPC · JPL
494781	2006 SR_{86}	—	September 14, 2006	Kitt Peak	Spacewatch	MRX	930 m	MPC · JPL
494782	2006 SX_{117}	—	September 24, 2006	Kitt Peak	Spacewatch	·	400 m	MPC · JPL
494783	2006 SL_{366}	—	September 30, 2006	Mount Lemmon	Mount Lemmon Survey	·	820 m	MPC · JPL
494784	2006 TN_{37}	—	October 12, 2006	Kitt Peak	Spacewatch	·	1.9 km	MPC · JPL
494785	2006 TJ_{44}	—	September 25, 2006	Mount Lemmon	Mount Lemmon Survey	·	1.1 km	MPC · JPL
494786	2006 TL_{67}	—	September 17, 2006	Catalina	CSS	·	1.0 km	MPC · JPL
494787	2006 TF_{83}	—	October 2, 2006	Mount Lemmon	Mount Lemmon Survey	HNS	1.2 km	MPC · JPL
494788	2006 TD_{126}	—	October 2, 2006	Mount Lemmon	Mount Lemmon Survey	·	1.3 km	MPC · JPL
494789	2006 UB_{61}	—	October 4, 2006	Mount Lemmon	Mount Lemmon Survey	·	1.1 km	MPC · JPL
494790	2006 UR_{169}	—	September 30, 2006	Catalina	CSS	GAL	1.5 km	MPC · JPL
494791	2006 UW_{217}	—	October 28, 2006	Mount Lemmon	Mount Lemmon Survey	·	1.0 km	MPC · JPL
494792	2006 UY_{282}	—	October 16, 2006	Kitt Peak	Spacewatch	AGN	1.1 km	MPC · JPL
494793	2006 UU_{336}	—	October 21, 2006	Kitt Peak	Spacewatch	JUN	940 m	MPC · JPL
494794	2006 VU_{13}	—	October 23, 2006	Catalina	CSS	H	600 m	MPC · JPL
494795	2006 WM_{175}	—	November 11, 2006	Kitt Peak	Spacewatch	·	880 m	MPC · JPL
494796	2006 WV_{181}	—	November 19, 2006	Kitt Peak	Spacewatch	·	1.3 km	MPC · JPL
494797	2006 XY_{9}	—	December 9, 2006	Kitt Peak	Spacewatch	·	1.8 km	MPC · JPL
494798	2006 XL_{59}	—	December 14, 2006	Kitt Peak	Spacewatch	·	1.5 km	MPC · JPL
494799	2006 YV_{18}	—	December 23, 2006	Mount Lemmon	Mount Lemmon Survey	·	1.9 km	MPC · JPL
494800	2006 YV_{42}	—	December 23, 2006	Catalina	CSS	H	580 m	MPC · JPL

== 494801–494900 ==
back to top

Designation			Discovery			Properties		Ref
Permanent	Provisional	Named after	Date	Site	Discoverer(s)	Category	Diam.	Ref
494801	2007 AA_{17}	—	November 21, 2006	Mount Lemmon	Mount Lemmon Survey	·	1.9 km	MPC · JPL
494802	2007 BS_{17}	—	January 17, 2007	Catalina	CSS	·	2.4 km	MPC · JPL
494803	2007 CU_{36}	—	January 10, 2007	Mount Lemmon	Mount Lemmon Survey	·	1.3 km	MPC · JPL
494804	2007 DU_{69}	—	November 16, 2006	Mount Lemmon	Mount Lemmon Survey	·	810 m	MPC · JPL
494805	2007 DS_{85}	—	February 21, 2007	Mount Lemmon	Mount Lemmon Survey	PAD	1.5 km	MPC · JPL
494806	2007 HZ_{39}	—	March 16, 2007	Mount Lemmon	Mount Lemmon Survey	·	580 m	MPC · JPL
494807	2007 JF_{37}	—	April 25, 2007	Kitt Peak	Spacewatch	·	2.2 km	MPC · JPL
494808	2007 LV_{37}	—	June 12, 2007	Kitt Peak	Spacewatch	LIX	3.9 km	MPC · JPL
494809	2007 RH_{143}	—	July 18, 2007	Mount Lemmon	Mount Lemmon Survey	·	1.7 km	MPC · JPL
494810	2007 RB_{150}	—	September 13, 2007	Catalina	CSS	T_{j} (2.94) · 3:2	6.2 km	MPC · JPL
494811	2007 RE_{155}	—	September 10, 2007	Mount Lemmon	Mount Lemmon Survey	·	2.4 km	MPC · JPL
494812	2007 RS_{202}	—	September 13, 2007	Kitt Peak	Spacewatch	·	2.5 km	MPC · JPL
494813	2007 RF_{239}	—	September 5, 2007	Catalina	CSS	·	1.1 km	MPC · JPL
494814	2007 RC_{278}	—	September 5, 2007	Catalina	CSS	H	540 m	MPC · JPL
494815	2007 RA_{308}	—	April 25, 2006	Kitt Peak	Spacewatch	·	2.4 km	MPC · JPL
494816	2007 SG	—	September 4, 2007	Catalina	CSS	·	3.4 km	MPC · JPL
494817	2007 SD_{22}	—	September 24, 2007	Kitt Peak	Spacewatch	·	910 m	MPC · JPL
494818	2007 TX_{10}	—	September 13, 2007	Mount Lemmon	Mount Lemmon Survey	·	3.1 km	MPC · JPL
494819	2007 TP_{39}	—	October 6, 2007	Kitt Peak	Spacewatch	NYS	970 m	MPC · JPL
494820	2007 TK_{43}	—	September 10, 2007	Mount Lemmon	Mount Lemmon Survey	·	620 m	MPC · JPL
494821	2007 TN_{80}	—	September 21, 2007	XuYi	PMO NEO Survey Program	·	880 m	MPC · JPL
494822	2007 TT_{104}	—	September 15, 2007	Mount Lemmon	Mount Lemmon Survey	·	580 m	MPC · JPL
494823	2007 TC_{110}	—	October 7, 2007	Catalina	CSS	H	550 m	MPC · JPL
494824	2007 TA_{137}	—	September 15, 2007	Catalina	CSS	·	3.2 km	MPC · JPL
494825	2007 TT_{145}	—	September 10, 2007	Kitt Peak	Spacewatch	NYS	730 m	MPC · JPL
494826	2007 TE_{165}	—	October 8, 2007	Catalina	CSS	·	980 m	MPC · JPL
494827	2007 TF_{199}	—	October 8, 2007	Kitt Peak	Spacewatch	·	640 m	MPC · JPL
494828	2007 TP_{229}	—	October 8, 2007	Kitt Peak	Spacewatch	NYS	860 m	MPC · JPL
494829	2007 TM_{248}	—	October 10, 2007	Anderson Mesa	LONEOS	·	1.8 km	MPC · JPL
494830	2007 TG_{253}	—	September 12, 2007	Mount Lemmon	Mount Lemmon Survey	THM	1.9 km	MPC · JPL
494831	2007 TJ_{288}	—	September 18, 2007	Anderson Mesa	LONEOS	·	760 m	MPC · JPL
494832	2007 TS_{298}	—	October 12, 2007	Kitt Peak	Spacewatch	THM	1.8 km	MPC · JPL
494833	2007 TW_{299}	—	October 8, 2007	Kitt Peak	Spacewatch	3:2 · SHU	3.5 km	MPC · JPL
494834	2007 TO_{428}	—	October 11, 2007	Catalina	CSS	·	1.1 km	MPC · JPL
494835	2007 TD_{431}	—	October 10, 2007	Kitt Peak	Spacewatch	·	2.0 km	MPC · JPL
494836	2007 UR_{9}	—	September 18, 2007	Anderson Mesa	LONEOS	·	620 m	MPC · JPL
494837	2007 UM_{96}	—	October 30, 2007	Kitt Peak	Spacewatch	·	2.0 km	MPC · JPL
494838	2007 UU_{104}	—	October 30, 2007	Kitt Peak	Spacewatch	·	920 m	MPC · JPL
494839	2007 VL_{334}	—	November 13, 2007	Kitt Peak	Spacewatch	·	3.0 km	MPC · JPL
494840	2007 WJ_{1}	—	November 13, 2007	Kitt Peak	Spacewatch	H	410 m	MPC · JPL
494841	2007 XC_{16}	—	October 20, 2007	Mount Lemmon	Mount Lemmon Survey	·	2.1 km	MPC · JPL
494842	2007 YH_{14}	—	November 3, 2007	Mount Lemmon	Mount Lemmon Survey	·	890 m	MPC · JPL
494843	2008 AO_{25}	—	January 10, 2008	Mount Lemmon	Mount Lemmon Survey	·	1.1 km	MPC · JPL
494844	2008 AN_{28}	—	January 10, 2008	Mount Lemmon	Mount Lemmon Survey	·	1.7 km	MPC · JPL
494845	2008 AQ_{33}	—	December 30, 2007	Catalina	CSS	H	530 m	MPC · JPL
494846	2008 AY_{76}	—	January 12, 2008	Kitt Peak	Spacewatch	·	970 m	MPC · JPL
494847	2008 CO_{5}	—	January 1, 2008	Mount Lemmon	Mount Lemmon Survey	·	1.3 km	MPC · JPL
494848	2008 CR_{6}	—	February 1, 2008	Kitt Peak	Spacewatch	JUN	830 m	MPC · JPL
494849	2008 CA_{48}	—	October 9, 2007	Mount Lemmon	Mount Lemmon Survey	JUN	1.3 km	MPC · JPL
494850	2008 CZ_{77}	—	February 6, 2008	XuYi	PMO NEO Survey Program	·	3.1 km	MPC · JPL
494851	2008 CY_{137}	—	February 1, 2008	Kitt Peak	Spacewatch	·	1.3 km	MPC · JPL
494852	2008 CC_{154}	—	February 9, 2008	Kitt Peak	Spacewatch	·	1.4 km	MPC · JPL
494853	2008 CT_{205}	—	February 2, 2008	Kitt Peak	Spacewatch	3:2	4.4 km	MPC · JPL
494854	2008 CN_{210}	—	February 2, 2008	Catalina	CSS	·	1.3 km	MPC · JPL
494855	2008 CX_{214}	—	February 12, 2008	Mount Lemmon	Mount Lemmon Survey	JUN	1.1 km	MPC · JPL
494856	2008 DY_{48}	—	February 14, 2008	Catalina	CSS	·	1.5 km	MPC · JPL
494857	2008 DD_{53}	—	February 29, 2008	Mount Lemmon	Mount Lemmon Survey	·	1.5 km	MPC · JPL
494858	2008 EZ_{11}	—	March 1, 2008	Kitt Peak	Spacewatch	·	1.4 km	MPC · JPL
494859	2008 ET_{17}	—	March 1, 2008	Kitt Peak	Spacewatch	·	1.3 km	MPC · JPL
494860	2008 ER_{26}	—	February 2, 2008	Kitt Peak	Spacewatch	JUN	1.0 km	MPC · JPL
494861	2008 EH_{36}	—	February 28, 2008	Mount Lemmon	Mount Lemmon Survey	·	1.4 km	MPC · JPL
494862	2008 EB_{38}	—	February 3, 2008	Kitt Peak	Spacewatch	·	1.2 km	MPC · JPL
494863	2008 ED_{112}	—	February 2, 2008	Kitt Peak	Spacewatch	·	880 m	MPC · JPL
494864	2008 EK_{135}	—	January 19, 2008	Mount Lemmon	Mount Lemmon Survey	·	1.6 km	MPC · JPL
494865	2008 EE_{141}	—	February 29, 2008	Kitt Peak	Spacewatch	·	1.5 km	MPC · JPL
494866	2008 EH_{167}	—	February 13, 2008	Mount Lemmon	Mount Lemmon Survey	·	1.4 km	MPC · JPL
494867	2008 FY_{63}	—	March 28, 2008	Mount Lemmon	Mount Lemmon Survey	3:2 · SHU	4.6 km	MPC · JPL
494868	2008 FF_{125}	—	March 30, 2008	Kitt Peak	Spacewatch	·	1.6 km	MPC · JPL
494869	2008 GZ_{15}	—	April 3, 2008	Mount Lemmon	Mount Lemmon Survey	EUN	910 m	MPC · JPL
494870	2008 GB_{43}	—	April 4, 2008	Mount Lemmon	Mount Lemmon Survey	·	1.4 km	MPC · JPL
494871	2008 GK_{74}	—	March 30, 2008	Kitt Peak	Spacewatch	·	1.6 km	MPC · JPL
494872	2008 GG_{81}	—	March 5, 2008	Mount Lemmon	Mount Lemmon Survey	·	2.0 km	MPC · JPL
494873	2008 GO_{93}	—	April 7, 2008	Kitt Peak	Spacewatch	MIS	2.1 km	MPC · JPL
494874	2008 GU_{96}	—	April 8, 2008	Mount Lemmon	Mount Lemmon Survey	·	1.5 km	MPC · JPL
494875	2008 GW_{116}	—	April 3, 2008	Kitt Peak	Spacewatch	EUN	1.0 km	MPC · JPL
494876	2008 HX	—	April 24, 2008	Kitt Peak	Spacewatch	·	1.9 km	MPC · JPL
494877	2008 HT_{1}	—	April 6, 2008	Mount Lemmon	Mount Lemmon Survey	·	1.4 km	MPC · JPL
494878	2008 HD_{48}	—	March 29, 2008	Mount Lemmon	Mount Lemmon Survey	HNS	1.0 km	MPC · JPL
494879	2008 HF_{67}	—	April 26, 2008	Mount Lemmon	Mount Lemmon Survey	·	1.5 km	MPC · JPL
494880	2008 SQ_{7}	—	September 23, 2008	Socorro	LINEAR	APO	380 m	MPC · JPL
494881	2008 SF_{36}	—	September 20, 2008	Kitt Peak	Spacewatch	·	870 m	MPC · JPL
494882	2008 SH_{51}	—	September 20, 2008	Mount Lemmon	Mount Lemmon Survey	THM	1.8 km	MPC · JPL
494883	2008 SV_{58}	—	September 20, 2008	Kitt Peak	Spacewatch	·	2.2 km	MPC · JPL
494884	2008 SZ_{66}	—	August 26, 2008	Črni Vrh	Zakrajsek, J.	TIN	1.3 km	MPC · JPL
494885	2008 ST_{86}	—	September 9, 2008	Kitt Peak	Spacewatch	EOS	1.6 km	MPC · JPL
494886	2008 SD_{106}	—	September 21, 2008	Kitt Peak	Spacewatch	·	3.2 km	MPC · JPL
494887	2008 SE_{108}	—	July 30, 2008	Kitt Peak	Spacewatch	·	1.5 km	MPC · JPL
494888	2008 SC_{180}	—	September 24, 2008	Mount Lemmon	Mount Lemmon Survey	·	680 m	MPC · JPL
494889	2008 SH_{185}	—	September 24, 2008	Kitt Peak	Spacewatch	T_{j} (2.95)	4.0 km	MPC · JPL
494890	2008 SG_{267}	—	September 23, 2008	Catalina	CSS	·	3.1 km	MPC · JPL
494891	2008 TO_{9}	—	September 23, 2008	Mount Lemmon	Mount Lemmon Survey	·	820 m	MPC · JPL
494892	2008 TW_{135}	—	September 26, 2008	Kitt Peak	Spacewatch	·	3.0 km	MPC · JPL
494893	2008 UH_{20}	—	September 22, 2008	Kitt Peak	Spacewatch	·	1.0 km	MPC · JPL
494894	2008 UO_{22}	—	October 1, 2008	Kitt Peak	Spacewatch	·	620 m	MPC · JPL
494895	2008 UA_{53}	—	October 20, 2008	Mount Lemmon	Mount Lemmon Survey	·	2.1 km	MPC · JPL
494896	2008 UC_{81}	—	October 7, 2005	Mauna Kea	A. Boattini	MAS	550 m	MPC · JPL
494897	2008 UG_{97}	—	October 25, 2008	Socorro	LINEAR	·	640 m	MPC · JPL
494898	2008 UB_{121}	—	October 22, 2008	Kitt Peak	Spacewatch	·	5.0 km	MPC · JPL
494899	2008 UD_{136}	—	October 23, 2008	Kitt Peak	Spacewatch	·	2.6 km	MPC · JPL
494900	2008 UJ_{198}	—	September 7, 2008	Mount Lemmon	Mount Lemmon Survey	·	750 m	MPC · JPL

== 494901–495000 ==
back to top

Designation			Discovery			Properties		Ref
Permanent	Provisional	Named after	Date	Site	Discoverer(s)	Category	Diam.	Ref
494901	2008 UN_{199}	—	October 30, 2008	Kitt Peak	Spacewatch	H	350 m	MPC · JPL
494902	2008 UO_{213}	—	October 24, 2008	Kitt Peak	Spacewatch	·	2.5 km	MPC · JPL
494903	2008 UQ_{254}	—	October 1, 2008	Catalina	CSS	·	2.7 km	MPC · JPL
494904	2008 UK_{266}	—	October 28, 2008	Kitt Peak	Spacewatch	PHO	740 m	MPC · JPL
494905	2008 UN_{282}	—	October 28, 2008	Kitt Peak	Spacewatch	·	2.3 km	MPC · JPL
494906	2008 UU_{288}	—	October 28, 2008	Mount Lemmon	Mount Lemmon Survey	·	1.9 km	MPC · JPL
494907	2008 UG_{290}	—	October 28, 2008	Kitt Peak	Spacewatch	EUP	5.1 km	MPC · JPL
494908	2008 UA_{310}	—	October 5, 2008	La Sagra	OAM	·	4.0 km	MPC · JPL
494909	2008 UX_{315}	—	October 30, 2008	Kitt Peak	Spacewatch	·	1.2 km	MPC · JPL
494910	2008 UK_{358}	—	October 26, 2008	Kitt Peak	Spacewatch	EOS	2.1 km	MPC · JPL
494911	2008 US_{359}	—	October 28, 2008	Kitt Peak	Spacewatch	·	2.5 km	MPC · JPL
494912	2008 VH_{25}	—	November 2, 2008	Kitt Peak	Spacewatch	·	2.1 km	MPC · JPL
494913	2008 VO_{40}	—	October 26, 2008	Kitt Peak	Spacewatch	·	3.4 km	MPC · JPL
494914	2008 VD_{43}	—	October 22, 2008	Kitt Peak	Spacewatch	·	3.6 km	MPC · JPL
494915	2008 VM_{56}	—	October 26, 2008	Kitt Peak	Spacewatch	·	890 m	MPC · JPL
494916	2008 VV_{73}	—	February 24, 2006	Kitt Peak	Spacewatch	·	710 m	MPC · JPL
494917	2008 WF_{3}	—	October 2, 2008	Kitt Peak	Spacewatch	·	1.8 km	MPC · JPL
494918	2008 WQ_{27}	—	October 24, 2008	Kitt Peak	Spacewatch	·	2.7 km	MPC · JPL
494919	2008 WU_{31}	—	November 19, 2008	Mount Lemmon	Mount Lemmon Survey	·	2.5 km	MPC · JPL
494920	2008 WC_{62}	—	September 29, 2008	Mount Lemmon	Mount Lemmon Survey	·	720 m	MPC · JPL
494921	2008 WE_{80}	—	November 20, 2008	Kitt Peak	Spacewatch	·	3.0 km	MPC · JPL
494922	2008 WJ_{115}	—	November 22, 2008	Kitt Peak	Spacewatch	·	890 m	MPC · JPL
494923	2008 WW_{140}	—	November 2, 2008	Catalina	CSS	TIR	2.7 km	MPC · JPL
494924	2008 WC_{141}	—	October 26, 2008	Mount Lemmon	Mount Lemmon Survey	·	1.3 km	MPC · JPL
494925	2008 XG_{14}	—	December 1, 2008	Kitt Peak	Spacewatch	·	5.0 km	MPC · JPL
494926	2008 XW_{21}	—	November 23, 2008	Kitt Peak	Spacewatch	LUT	3.7 km	MPC · JPL
494927	2008 YC_{27}	—	November 9, 2008	Mount Lemmon	Mount Lemmon Survey	PHO	1.1 km	MPC · JPL
494928	2008 YH_{85}	—	November 19, 2008	Kitt Peak	Spacewatch	(2076)	640 m	MPC · JPL
494929	2008 YO_{93}	—	December 29, 2008	Kitt Peak	Spacewatch	NYS	890 m	MPC · JPL
494930	2008 YV_{98}	—	December 29, 2008	Kitt Peak	Spacewatch	·	3.4 km	MPC · JPL
494931	2008 YL_{114}	—	December 21, 2008	Kitt Peak	Spacewatch	·	910 m	MPC · JPL
494932	2009 AU_{37}	—	December 22, 2008	Kitt Peak	Spacewatch	V	540 m	MPC · JPL
494933	2009 BO_{2}	—	December 21, 2008	Kitt Peak	Spacewatch	H	430 m	MPC · JPL
494934	2009 BF_{38}	—	January 16, 2009	Kitt Peak	Spacewatch	MAS	510 m	MPC · JPL
494935	2009 BB_{44}	—	January 16, 2009	Kitt Peak	Spacewatch	·	1.0 km	MPC · JPL
494936	2009 BS_{53}	—	January 16, 2009	Mount Lemmon	Mount Lemmon Survey	·	1.0 km	MPC · JPL
494937	2009 BO_{81}	—	January 17, 2009	Kitt Peak	Spacewatch	·	1.0 km	MPC · JPL
494938	2009 CU_{15}	—	February 3, 2009	Kitt Peak	Spacewatch	·	680 m	MPC · JPL
494939	2009 DA_{48}	—	February 19, 2009	Catalina	CSS	H	660 m	MPC · JPL
494940	2009 DQ_{60}	—	February 22, 2009	Kitt Peak	Spacewatch	·	950 m	MPC · JPL
494941	2009 EE_{13}	—	February 14, 2009	Catalina	CSS	PHO	1.0 km	MPC · JPL
494942	2009 EH_{22}	—	March 2, 2009	Kitt Peak	Spacewatch	·	1.8 km	MPC · JPL
494943	2009 FS_{25}	—	March 17, 2009	Kitt Peak	Spacewatch	·	1.1 km	MPC · JPL
494944	2009 FG_{35}	—	November 3, 2007	Mount Lemmon	Mount Lemmon Survey	PHO	820 m	MPC · JPL
494945	2009 FQ_{52}	—	March 29, 2009	Kitt Peak	Spacewatch	MAS	660 m	MPC · JPL
494946	2009 HJ_{25}	—	April 17, 2009	Kitt Peak	Spacewatch	·	990 m	MPC · JPL
494947	2009 JV_{17}	—	May 3, 2009	Kitt Peak	Spacewatch	·	1.0 km	MPC · JPL
494948	2009 OE_{9}	—	July 28, 2009	La Sagra	OAM	·	910 m	MPC · JPL
494949	2009 OW_{9}	—	July 28, 2009	Tiki	Teamo, N.	·	1.3 km	MPC · JPL
494950	2009 PV_{9}	—	April 30, 2009	Mount Lemmon	Mount Lemmon Survey	·	1.3 km	MPC · JPL
494951	2009 PN_{15}	—	August 15, 2009	Kitt Peak	Spacewatch	·	1.5 km	MPC · JPL
494952	2009 QX_{4}	—	August 16, 2009	La Sagra	OAM	·	1.3 km	MPC · JPL
494953	2009 RP_{14}	—	September 12, 2009	Kitt Peak	Spacewatch	·	2.0 km	MPC · JPL
494954	2009 RQ_{18}	—	August 17, 2009	Catalina	CSS	·	1.7 km	MPC · JPL
494955	2009 RH_{19}	—	August 15, 2009	Kitt Peak	Spacewatch	·	2.0 km	MPC · JPL
494956	2009 RQ_{58}	—	September 15, 2009	Kitt Peak	Spacewatch	HOF	2.1 km	MPC · JPL
494957	2009 SK_{23}	—	January 6, 2005	Catalina	CSS	·	1.2 km	MPC · JPL
494958	2009 SZ_{46}	—	September 16, 2009	Kitt Peak	Spacewatch	·	1.6 km	MPC · JPL
494959	2009 SH_{73}	—	August 27, 2009	Kitt Peak	Spacewatch	·	2.7 km	MPC · JPL
494960	2009 SZ_{120}	—	September 18, 2009	Kitt Peak	Spacewatch	·	1.8 km	MPC · JPL
494961	2009 SV_{235}	—	September 18, 2009	Kitt Peak	Spacewatch	L4	7.4 km	MPC · JPL
494962	2009 SJ_{250}	—	September 19, 2009	Kitt Peak	Spacewatch	EOS	1.7 km	MPC · JPL
494963	2009 TH_{9}	—	September 29, 2009	Mount Lemmon	Mount Lemmon Survey	·	760 m	MPC · JPL
494964	2009 TA_{15}	—	October 13, 2009	Socorro	LINEAR	·	1.9 km	MPC · JPL
494965	2009 TL_{40}	—	October 15, 2009	Catalina	CSS	·	2.5 km	MPC · JPL
494966	2009 UR_{82}	—	September 18, 2009	Mount Lemmon	Mount Lemmon Survey	·	1.9 km	MPC · JPL
494967	2009 UB_{106}	—	September 19, 2009	Mount Lemmon	Mount Lemmon Survey	EOS	1.4 km	MPC · JPL
494968	2009 UA_{151}	—	May 14, 2008	Mount Lemmon	Mount Lemmon Survey	·	1.6 km	MPC · JPL
494969	2009 VO_{13}	—	November 8, 2009	Mount Lemmon	Mount Lemmon Survey	NAE	1.5 km	MPC · JPL
494970	2009 VA_{32}	—	September 16, 2009	Mount Lemmon	Mount Lemmon Survey	GEF	910 m	MPC · JPL
494971	2009 VB_{36}	—	October 26, 2009	Kitt Peak	Spacewatch	·	2.2 km	MPC · JPL
494972	2009 VQ_{67}	—	October 22, 2009	Mount Lemmon	Mount Lemmon Survey	·	4.4 km	MPC · JPL
494973	2009 VT_{96}	—	November 8, 2009	Kitt Peak	Spacewatch	·	3.6 km	MPC · JPL
494974	2009 WL_{78}	—	November 10, 2009	Kitt Peak	Spacewatch	·	2.9 km	MPC · JPL
494975	2009 WO_{106}	—	November 26, 2009	Mount Lemmon	Mount Lemmon Survey	APO	510 m	MPC · JPL
494976	2009 WY_{135}	—	October 23, 2009	Mount Lemmon	Mount Lemmon Survey	·	4.5 km	MPC · JPL
494977	2009 WN_{146}	—	October 25, 2009	Mount Lemmon	Mount Lemmon Survey	·	1.8 km	MPC · JPL
494978	2009 WJ_{148}	—	September 19, 2009	Mount Lemmon	Mount Lemmon Survey	·	2.2 km	MPC · JPL
494979	2009 WE_{165}	—	November 8, 2009	Kitt Peak	Spacewatch	·	1.1 km	MPC · JPL
494980	2009 WZ_{215}	—	October 17, 2009	Mount Lemmon	Mount Lemmon Survey	EOS	1.7 km	MPC · JPL
494981	2009 WE_{260}	—	November 21, 2009	Mount Lemmon	Mount Lemmon Survey	·	2.7 km	MPC · JPL
494982	2009 XR_{14}	—	December 15, 2009	Mount Lemmon	Mount Lemmon Survey	·	2.4 km	MPC · JPL
494983	2010 AW_{33}	—	January 7, 2010	Kitt Peak	Spacewatch	·	490 m	MPC · JPL
494984	2010 AJ_{37}	—	January 7, 2010	Kitt Peak	Spacewatch	·	560 m	MPC · JPL
494985	2010 AS_{41}	—	January 6, 2010	Catalina	CSS	TIR	3.4 km	MPC · JPL
494986	2010 AO_{55}	—	January 8, 2010	Kitt Peak	Spacewatch	·	670 m	MPC · JPL
494987	2010 BK_{86}	—	November 8, 2009	Mount Lemmon	Mount Lemmon Survey	·	3.2 km	MPC · JPL
494988	2010 CC_{2}	—	February 5, 2010	Catalina	CSS	·	2.6 km	MPC · JPL
494989	2010 CY_{108}	—	February 14, 2010	Mount Lemmon	Mount Lemmon Survey	·	4.1 km	MPC · JPL
494990	2010 CZ_{117}	—	January 12, 2010	Mount Lemmon	Mount Lemmon Survey	·	3.2 km	MPC · JPL
494991	2010 CM_{229}	—	February 9, 2010	WISE	WISE	PHO	3.0 km	MPC · JPL
494992	2010 EL_{77}	—	January 31, 2003	Kitt Peak	Spacewatch	·	540 m	MPC · JPL
494993	2010 EB_{100}	—	March 14, 2010	Kitt Peak	Spacewatch	·	770 m	MPC · JPL
494994	2010 FU_{29}	—	March 17, 2010	Kitt Peak	Spacewatch	·	1.0 km	MPC · JPL
494995	2010 GP_{97}	—	April 7, 2010	Kitt Peak	Spacewatch	·	730 m	MPC · JPL
494996	2010 HD_{76}	—	April 28, 2010	WISE	WISE	·	3.6 km	MPC · JPL
494997	2010 HY_{113}	—	May 27, 2000	Socorro	LINEAR	·	580 m	MPC · JPL
494998	2010 JR_{31}	—	May 5, 2010	Tzec Maun	E. Schwab	·	560 m	MPC · JPL
494999	2010 JU_{39}	—	May 9, 2010	Mount Lemmon	Mount Lemmon Survey	ATE · PHA	410 m	MPC · JPL
495000	2010 JF_{46}	—	May 7, 2010	Kitt Peak	Spacewatch	·	1.2 km	MPC · JPL

back to top
