= Ivan Radoev =

Ivan Radoev may refer to:

- Ivan Radoev (footballer) (1901–1985), Bulgarian footballer
- Ivan Radoev (poet) (1927–1994), Bulgarian lyrical poet and playwrighter
