= Pleven Regional Historical Museum =

Museum in Pleven, Bulgaria

Coordinates: 43°24′14″N 24°37′7″E

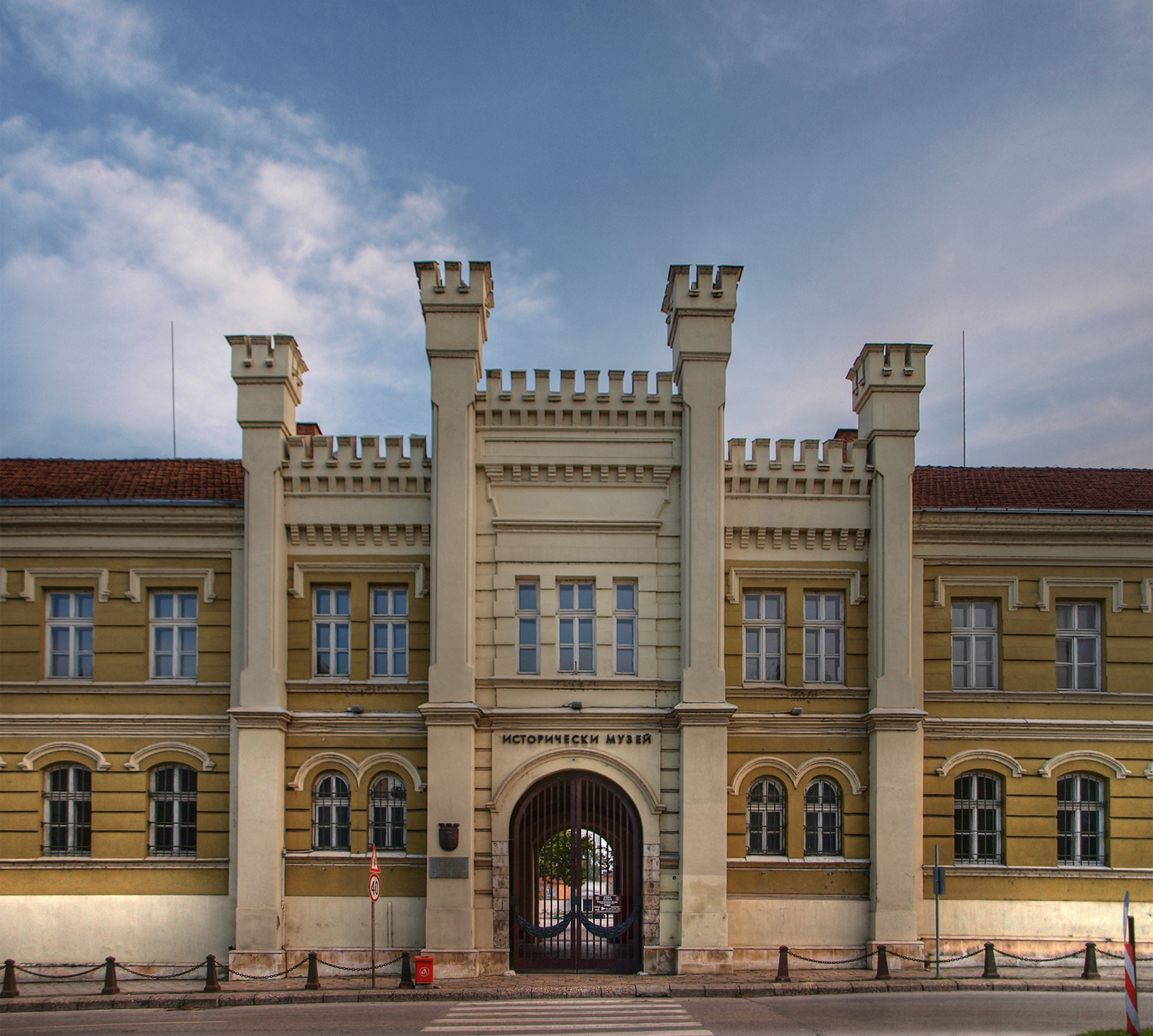
The main entrance to the museum's edifice

The Pleven Regional Historical Museum (Bulgarian: Регионален исторически музей — Плевен), founded in 1953, is one of the largest museums in Bulgaria. The museum is situated in a two-story edifice near the centre of Pleven that is a monument of culture of national importance and has an area of 7,000 m^{2}. Its main stock includes over 180,000 units and the museum library houses over 10,000 volumes of scientific literature and periodicals.

== History ==
The Pleven Regional Historical Museum has its roots in the local Archaeological Society founded in 1903, the goals of which included the creation of a museum, as well as the discovery and research of historical monuments in the town and the region. The first excavations of the Roman fortress of Storgosia in Kaylaka Park in May 1905 were organized and carried out by the society under the direction of Yurdan Kantardzhiev.

A museum collection that exhibited the items found was assembled by the society in 1911. In 1923, all the materials were moved to the Saglasie Community Centre, where a museum was established.

Officially founded in 1953, the museum moved to its current edifice, built between 1884 and 1888 after an Italian project for barracks, in 1984.

The museum became regional on 1 July 2000, embracing the provinces of Pleven and Lovech. Each year, the museum awards a "Friend of the Museum" honor to those that support the cultural institution.

== Exhibitions ==
The museum's permanent exposition of 5,000 items is situated in a total of 24 halls and is divided in 5 departments, devoted to archaeology, ethnography, the Bulgarian National Revival and the Ottoman rule of Bulgaria, modern history, and nature. Additionally, the numismatic collection that includes 25,000 coins is regarded as one of the richest in Bulgaria.

In 2025, the museum opened a new exhibition, "The Soldier in the Form of a Man: 9th Infantry Pleven Division in the Wars of National Unification (1912–1918)" (in Bulgarian, „Войникът във формата на човек 9-а пехотна Плевенска дивизия във войните за национално обединение (1912–1918)“ ), focusing on Pleven's military history.
