= Lukoil Neftohim Burgas =

Oil refinery in Bulgaria

LUKOIL Neftohim Burgas (Bulgarian: ЛУКОЙЛ Нефтохим Бургас), based in Burgas, Bulgaria, sometimes spelt "Neftochim Burgas," is one of the largest oil refineries in the Balkans and the largest industrial enterprise in Bulgaria.

Owned by Russian oil giant LUKOIL, the refinery has the biggest contribution among the privately owned enterprises to the country's GDP and to the state budget revenues. LUKOIL Neftohim Burgas is the leading producer and supplier of liquid fuels, petrochemicals and polymers for Bulgaria and the region and one of the leading companies in its field in Europe.

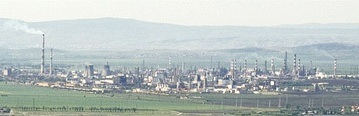
The LUKOIL Neftohim refinery

== History ==
The refinery became operational in 1964 and joined the Lukoil Group in 1999. With some improvements undertaken over the year that refinery has a capacity to process 7 million tonnes a year.

Crude oil arrives by sea to the nearby port terminal of Burgas Rosenetz before being piped to the refinery. In 2011 Lukoil was given a 35 year concession to run the Rosnetz oil terminal.

In November 2021, Competition commission of Bulgaria accused Bulgarian branch of “Lukoil” of abuse of market dominance, due to, despite company`s biggest warehouse and logistics infrastructure on local oil market, Lukoil`s withdrawal to stock oil from other companies at Lukoil taxable warehouses, switched to main oil terminals in Bulgaria as well as to provide access to pipes for transportation of imported oil. In return, “LUKOIL Neftohim Burgas” has brought into focus, that any of the rules on Bulgarian oil market weren`t violated by the company. In 2022, it announced that it could only work with Russian oil grade "Ural". After he managed to avoid the embargo on Russian oil, he produces his fuel at several times lower cost, which he sells now at market prices. The refinery is also under investigation for tax evasion and financial manipulation.

In 2022 Bulgaria managed to obtain an exemption to allow Russian crude oil to be imported for the refinery until December 2024. Certain conditions were made for the concession, including that no crude oil would be shipped out to the EU and no refined oil world be sent outside Bulgaria, except to Ukraine, or for storage. Exports of processed oil has however been made from the refinery, the Seaexpress shipped 40,000 tons to Rotterdam in August 2023, other shipments have used ship-to-ship transfers to hide the source from the ultimate buyer.

In April 2023 Lukoil Bulgaria and Lukoil Neftohim Burgas were fined 195 million Lev (€100m) for abuse of a dominant position on the oil market contrary to national and European competition law.

On 15 August 2023 Bulgaria took operational control of the Burgas Rosenetz oil terminal from Lukoil by terminating the concession contract.

In October 2023 Bulgaria imposed a punitive tax rate on the owner of the refinery of 60% to encourage the Russian owner to sell the refinery. The tax rate will drop to 15% for a new owner.

On 5 December 2023, Bulgaria announced that exports of Russian processed oil will cease by 1 January 2024. The refinery will need an investment of €500m to reconfigure to process lighter grade crude oil.

Bulgaria has announced that imports of Russian crude will cease on 1 March 2024, earlier than the EU concession date. (Note: As of August 2023, Bulgaria imported 3 million barrels per month of Russian-produced oil and is the fourth largest importer of Russian-produced oil in the world.)

In December 2023, a number of companies had expressed an interest in buying the refinery, including Azerbaijani state oil company SOCAR and American investors.

In January 2024, the refinery is not scheduled to receive any Russian oil, deliveries will be from Kazakhstan, Iraq, and Tunisia.

== Products ==
=== Fuels ===
LUKOIL Neftohim Burgas AD produces the following petrochemical products:

- Motor gasoline А-92 /export outside the EU/
- Motor gasoline А-95 under EN-228 /Euro-5/
- Motor gasoline А-98 under EN-228 /Euro-5/
- Low octane gasoline /LOG/
- Diesel fuel without bio component under EN-590 /Euro-5/
- Diesel fuel with bio component B4 under EN-590 /Euro-5/
- Gas oil 0,1% S
- Jet fuel А-1
- Fuel oil
- Bitumen
- Vacuum residue

=== Other products ===
- Propane-butane under EN-589.
- Process Sulfur (palletized and "lumps").

=== Polymers ===
- Polypropylene

== Workplace ==
LUKOIL Neftohim Burgas employs 1,348 people (2019), the average salary being the highest among industrial companies in the country. The refinery has operated entirely on self-produced electric power since 23 May 2000 and uses water from the nearby Lake Mandrensko.

== Taxation ==
Lukoil Neftohim Burgas had never paid tax in Bulgaria as profits were sent to the parent in Switzerland. Then in 2022 tax of BGN 3.5 million was paid. It was expected that tax in 2023 would amount to BGN 100 million and BGN 600-700 million in 2024.

The tax rate was raised to 60% in October 2023.

== See also ==
- Plama Pleven Refinery
