= Ivan Radoev (poet) =

Bulgarian poet and playwright

Ivan Dashev Radoev (also spelled Iwan Radoew) (Bulgarian: Иван Дашев Радоев; March 30, 1927, in Pordim, Bulgaria – July 10, 1994) was a lyrical poet and playwright from Bulgaria.

== Biography ==
Radoev's plays have been translated into more than 12 languages and performed in multiple countries, from Cuba to Mongolia. In 1992 he received the Special Award for lifetime achievement from the International Academy of Arts in France. Radoev wrote about crippled emotions, failing relationships and the need for love. But ever present in the background was the clash between the need for personal freedom and the growing social pressure of the totalitarian state where ideology could not tolerate individualism."

Upon Radoev's death in 1994, the Pleven municipal theater in Plevin Bulgaria was renamed Ivan Radoev Dramatic Theatre

== Works ==
Among his most important books of poetry are: "Spring dawn. Poems "(1953)," Poems "(1958)," a ballad poem "(1960)," A white sheet "(1975)," Poems and Poems "(1978)," Bad dreams. Poems "(1987)," White sinking. Weighing machine. Phoenix "(1992) and "My Children Are Words"(1994). He was one of the founders of lyric drama in Bulgaria with plays including "The world is small," "Great Comeback", "Red and Brown", "Sadat and Orpheus", "Cannibal", "Bull", "Miracle", and "Sun".

=== Translations into English ===
- "Ivan Radoev Three Poems" translated by Kapka Kassabova
- "My Children Are Words" translated by Don D. Wilson

=== Filmography ===
- Chudo (1996) (TV) (play) a.k.a. "A Miracle" - Europe (English title)
- "Petimata ot RMS" (1977) TV series a.k.a. "RMS Five" - Europe (English title)
- Nakovalnya ili chuk (1972) (drama "Cherveno i kafyavo") a.k.a. "Hammer or Anvil" - Europe (English title)
- Avtostop (1972) a.k.a. "Hitchhiking" - Europe (English title)
