= Plama Pleven =

Oil refinery in Bulgaria

- Industry: Oil and gas
- Founded: 1971
- Defunct: 1998
- Successor: Nova Plama
- Headquarters: Pleven, Bulgaria
- Products: Fuel, Lubricant, Petrochemicals
- Website: https://www.plama.bg/

Plama Pleven (Плама Плевен) is a former Bulgarian oil refinery located near the city of Pleven. The facility was opened in 1971 as a state owned company. In 1996, Plama Pleven was privatized by the Sofia-based company Euroenergy, but it filed for bankruptcy two years later.

== History ==
Plama Pleven was found in 1971 as a state-owned enterprise near the city of Pleven in the northern part of Bulgaria. In 1996, the facility was privatized by Euroenergy for 61.8 million BGN (before denomination) and a debt of 61.8 bn BGN (before denomination). The new owner failed to stabilize the refinery, and in 1998 an insolvency procedure started. The company officially announced bankruptcy in 1999. Following the bankruptcy, the assets were transferred to a new company called Nova Plama (Нова Плама), but production was not restored. Nova Plama subsequently went bankrupt in 2006. Rumors circulated about possible international investment from China or Iran, but this never came to fruition. The facility remains closed to this day.

== Location ==
Plama Pleven was built near the city of Pleven in Northern Bulgaria. It was located in an area far from navigable rivers and coastlines. This location was chosen due to the small oil deposits in the region and for strategic military reasons as the only other Bulgarian refinery at that time, Neftochim, now LUKOIL Neftochim Burgas, was located in the Black Sea city of Bourgas near the Turkish border. The facility's relative isolation is cited as a primary reason for the company's decision to file for bankruptcy.
