= Pleven =

Pleven Плевен
- City
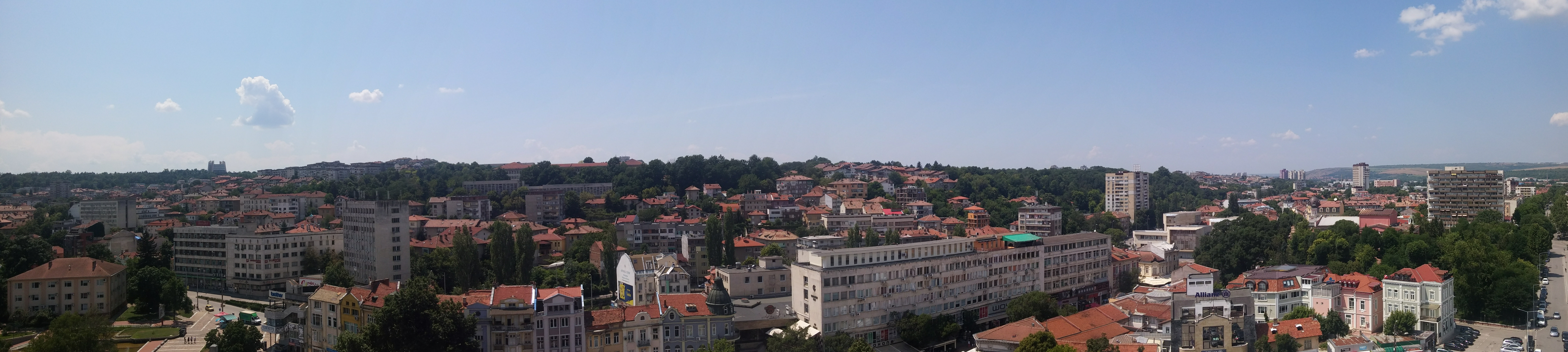
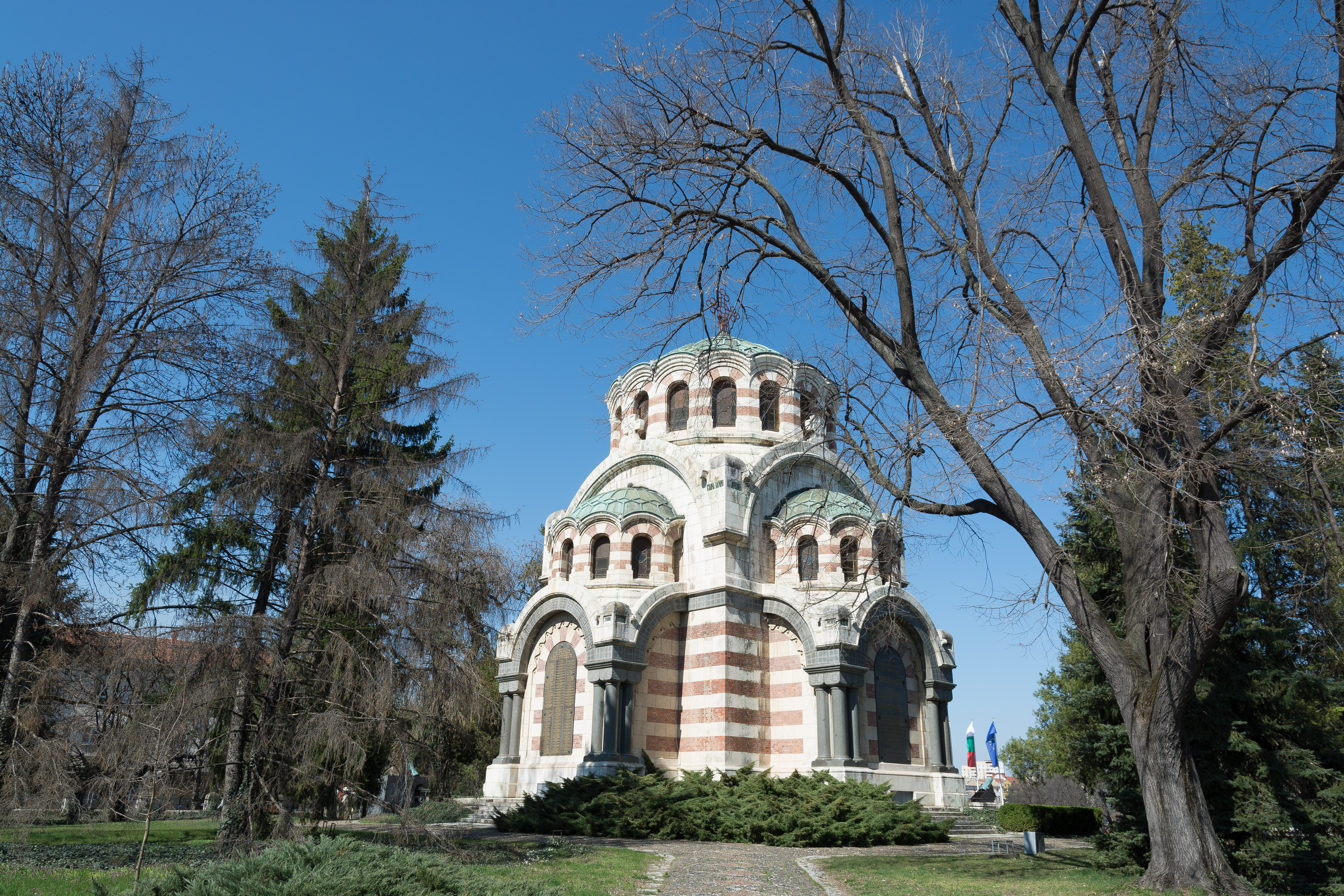
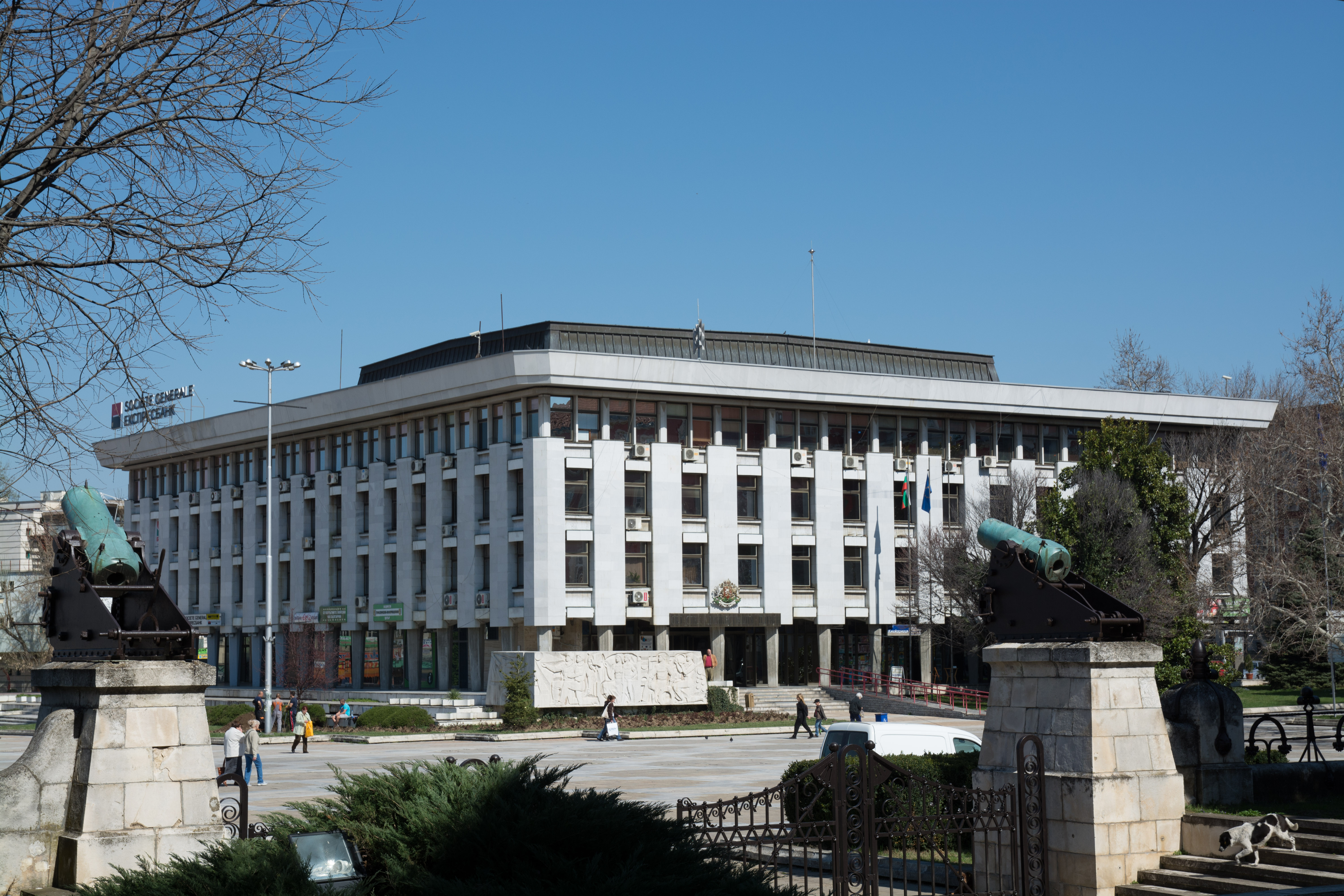
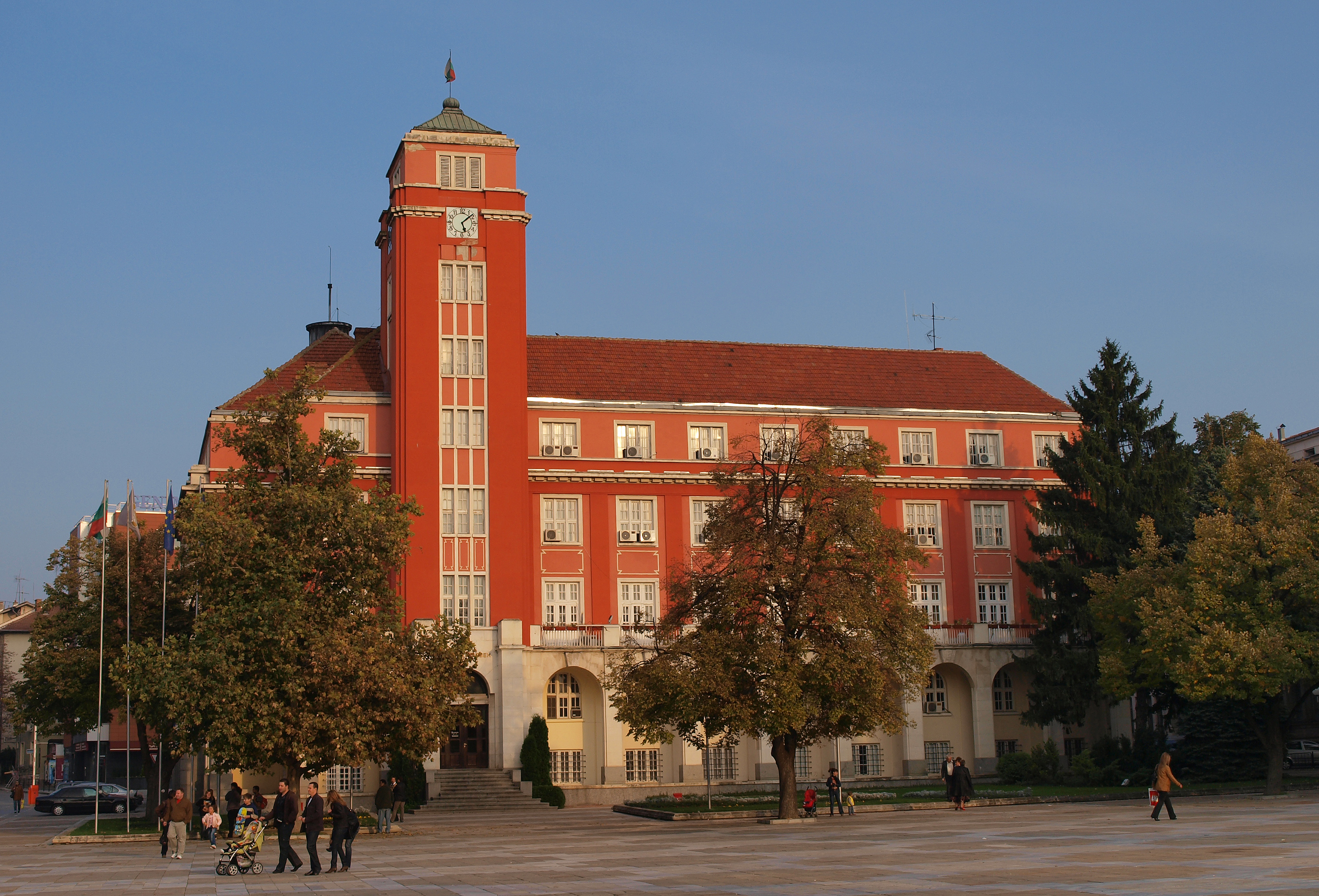
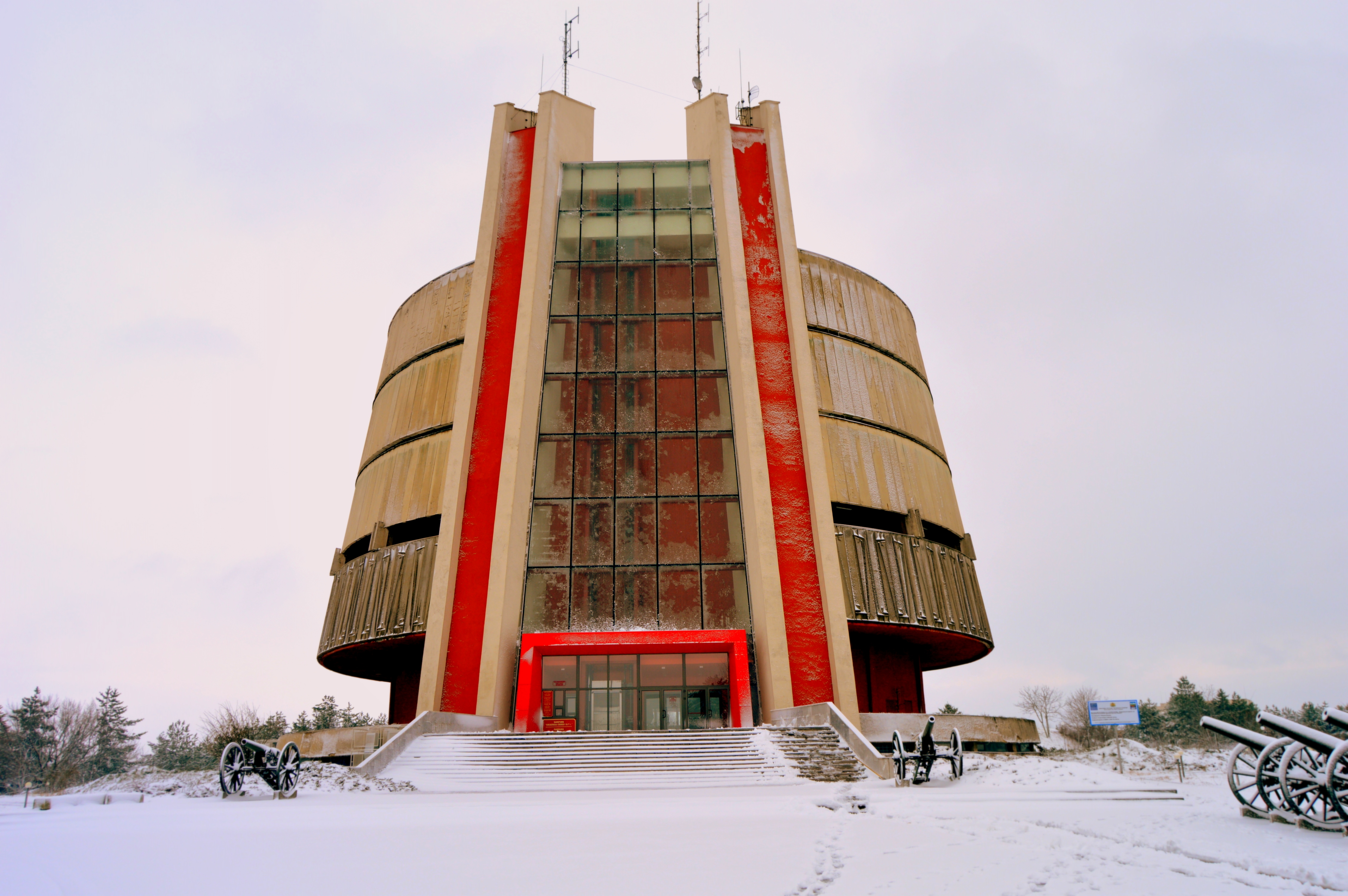
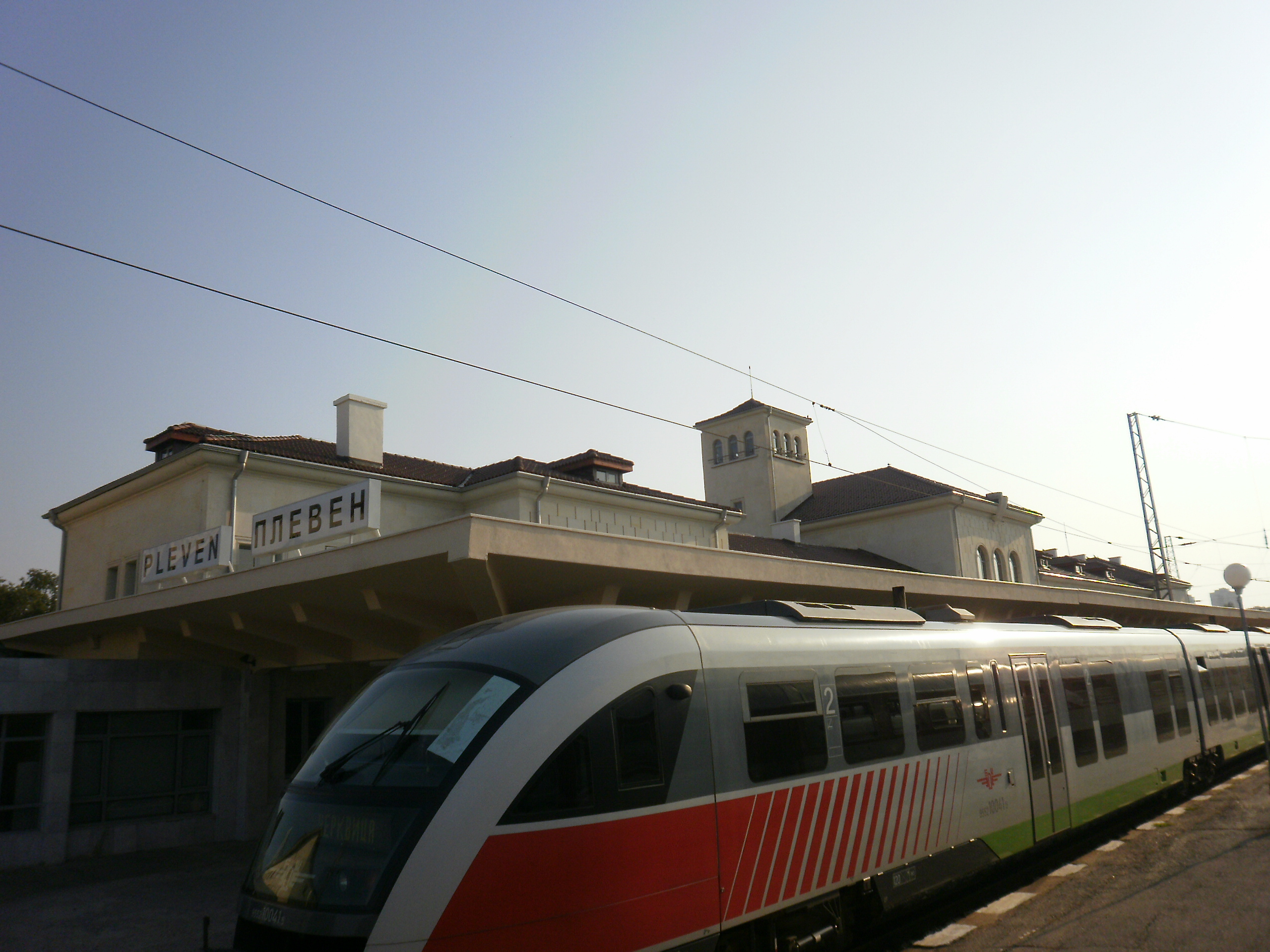
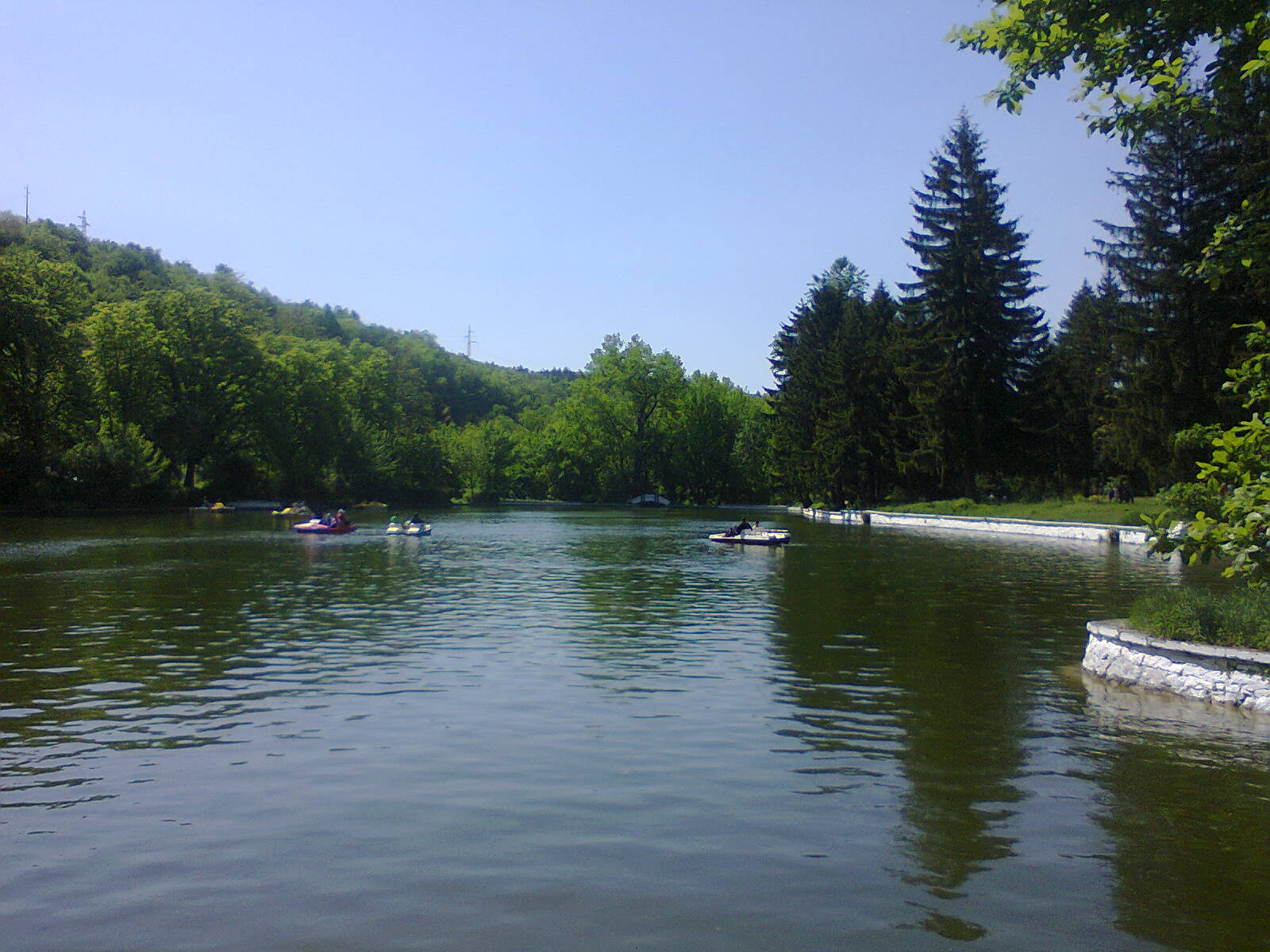
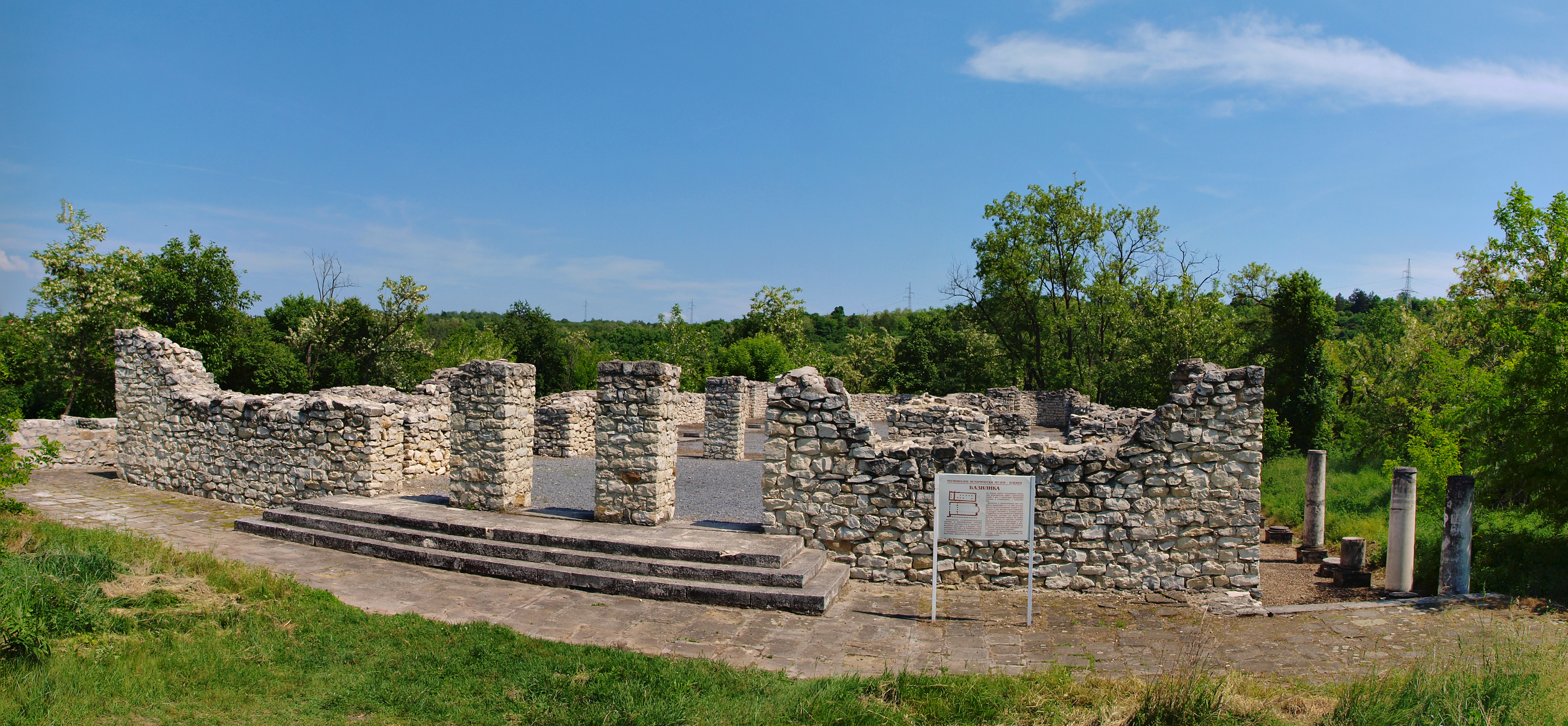
- Pleven

- Flag Coat of arms

- Location of Pleven Pleven (Balkans) Pleven (Europe)
- Coordinates: 43°24′28″N 24°37′13″E
- Country: Bulgaria
- Province (Oblast): Pleven
- First human settlement: 5th millennium BC

Government
  - Mayor: Dr. Valentin Hristov (GERB)

Area
  - City: 85 km^{2} (33 sq mi)
- Elevation: 116 m (381 ft)

Population (2022)
  - City: 90,209
  - Urban: 110,843
- Time zone: UTC+2 (EET)
  - Summer (DST): UTC+3 (EEST)
- Postal Code: 5800
- Area code: 064
- ISO 3166 code: BG-15
- Vehicle registration: EH
- Website: Official website

Pleven (Bulgarian: Плèвен pronounced [ˈplɛvɛn]) is the seventh most populous city in Bulgaria. Located in the northern part of the country, it is the administrative centre of Pleven Province, as well as of the subordinate Pleven municipality. It is the biggest economic center in Northwestern Bulgaria. At the 2021 census its population was 89,823.

Internationally known for the siege of Plevna of 1877, today it is a major economic centre of the Bulgarian Northwest and Central North and the third largest city of Northern Bulgaria after Varna and Ruse.

== Name ==
The name comes from the Slavic word plevnya ("barn") or from plevel, meaning "weed", sharing the same root, and the Slavic suffix -en.

== Geography ==
Pleven is in an agricultural region in the middle of the Danubian Plain, the historical region of Moesia, surrounded by low limestone hills, the Pleven Heights. The city's central location in Northern Bulgaria defines its importance as a big administrative, economic, political, cultural and transport centre. Pleven is 170 kilometres (106 miles) from the capital city of Sofia, 320 km (199 miles) west of the Bulgarian Black Sea Coast and 50 km (31 miles) south of the Danube.

The river Vit flows near the city and the tiny Tuchenitsa river (commonly known in Pleven as Barata, literally "The Streamlet") crosses it.

== Neighborhoods & Districts ==
Pleven, like all cities in Bulgaria, is divided into a number of neighbourhoods and residential complex's. Residential areas are often denoted with zhk. (жк.) that stands for residential complex (Bulgarian: Жилищен Комплекс). The two main and larger residential complex's in Pleven are Storgozia (Bulgarian: жк. Сторгозия) and Druzhba (Bulgarian: жк. Дружба) which are among the cities largest residential areas. These two residential areas are mostly composed of brutalist-style apartment blocks built during Bulgaria's communist era.

The centre of Pleven features large squares, restaurants, stores, cafés and banks. It serves as a major commercial and social area of the city. A big part of the centre is the water cascades and fountains, the Regional Historical Museum, the Pleven Municipality Hall, the Svetlin Rusev Donative Exhibition, St George the Conqueror Chapel, the Ivan Radoev Dramatic Theatre and the City Garden.

Pleven is home to a wide variety of nature and greenery. The largest park in Pleven is the Kaylaka Park (Bulgarian: Кайлъка) covering approximately 10 km². It is a protected area which is home to reservoirs and the Tuchenitsa River which flows through parts of the city. The park features some hotels, restaurants and children's play areas as well as a tennis court, the Pleven Zoo and the Summer Theatre (Bulgarian: Летен Театър) which hosts a variety of music performances. The Kaylaka Park contains the ruins of the Roman fortress, Storgosia. Other parks in Pleven include Skobelev Park (Bulgarian: Скобелев Парк) where the Pleven Panorama is located, the City Garden and 10-ti-dekemvri Park.

The north of Pleven houses large industrial zones with a diverse range of companies and factories. The industrial zones feature, but are not limited to, automotive components and repair services, textile manufacturing, engineering and metalwork, wholesale and trade facilities, general manufacturing and rail freight and industrial rail sidings

Pleven is also home to a large amount of villa zones (Bulgarian: Вилна зона) and other peripheral localities. Villa zones are generally a low density area typically in the outskirts or less densely populated area of a city.

== Climate ==
Pleven has a humid continental climate (Köppen Climate Classification Dfa). Winters are cold with snow: temperatures can fall below −20 °C (−4 °F) overnight. Springs are mild, with temperatures around 20 °C (68 °F). Summers are warm, and temperatures have exceeded 38 °C (100 °F) on occasion. The average annual temperature is around 12 °C (54 °F).

Climate data for Pleven, Bulgaria
Month	Jan	Feb	Mar	Apr	May	Jun	Jul	Aug	Sep	Oct	Nov	Dec	Year
Record high °C (°F)	22.8 (73.0)	24.0 (75.2)	31.2 (88.2)	35.1 (95.2)	37.5 (99.5)	40.5 (104.9)	44 (111)	41.8 (107.2)	40.8 (105.4)	38.3 (100.9)	28.8 (83.8)	23.4 (74.1)	44 (111)
Mean daily maximum °C (°F)	1.3 (34.3)	4.6 (40.3)	10.3 (50.5)	18.1 (64.6)	23.1 (73.6)	26.7 (80.1)	29.3 (84.7)	29.4 (84.9)	25.4 (77.7)	18.2 (64.8)	10.5 (50.9)	4.1 (39.4)	16.8 (62.2)
Daily mean °C (°F)	−2.2 (28.0)	0.6 (33.1)	5.4 (41.7)	12.5 (54.5)	17.4 (63.3)	21.0 (69.8)	23.4 (74.1)	22.9 (73.2)	18.6 (65.5)	12.4 (54.3)	6.4 (43.5)	0.7 (33.3)	11.6 (52.9)
Mean daily minimum °C (°F)	−5.5 (22.1)	−3.3 (26.1)	0.9 (33.6)	6.8 (44.2)	11.5 (52.7)	14.8 (58.6)	16.7 (62.1)	16.1 (61.0)	12.3 (54.1)	7.2 (45.0)	2.9 (37.2)	−2.0 (28.4)	6.5 (43.7)
Record low °C (°F)	−29.3 (−20.7)	−22.2 (−8.0)	−18.9 (−2.0)	−5.7 (21.7)	0.6 (33.1)	3.4 (38.1)	8.7 (47.7)	8.9 (48.0)	−0.6 (30.9)	−6.5 (20.3)	−20.4 (−4.7)	−24 (−11)	−29.3 (−20.7)
Average precipitation mm (inches)	39 (1.5)	34 (1.3)	33 (1.3)	52 (2.0)	68 (2.7)	81 (3.2)	63 (2.5)	40 (1.6)	38 (1.5)	44 (1.7)	45 (1.8)	41 (1.6)	578 (22.8)
Average precipitation days (≥ 0.1 mm)	10.7	10	9.4	9.4	12.9	10.6	8.4	6	6.9	9.4	7.9	13.6	115.2
Average snowy days	8.3	7.8	4.1	0.1	0	0	0	0	0	0	2	7.9	30.2
Source 1: Stringmeteo
Source 2: Meteomanz (precipitation days and snow days 2005-2013)

== History ==
=== Prehistory and antiquity ===
The earliest traces of human settlement in the area date from the 5th millennium BC, the Neolithic.

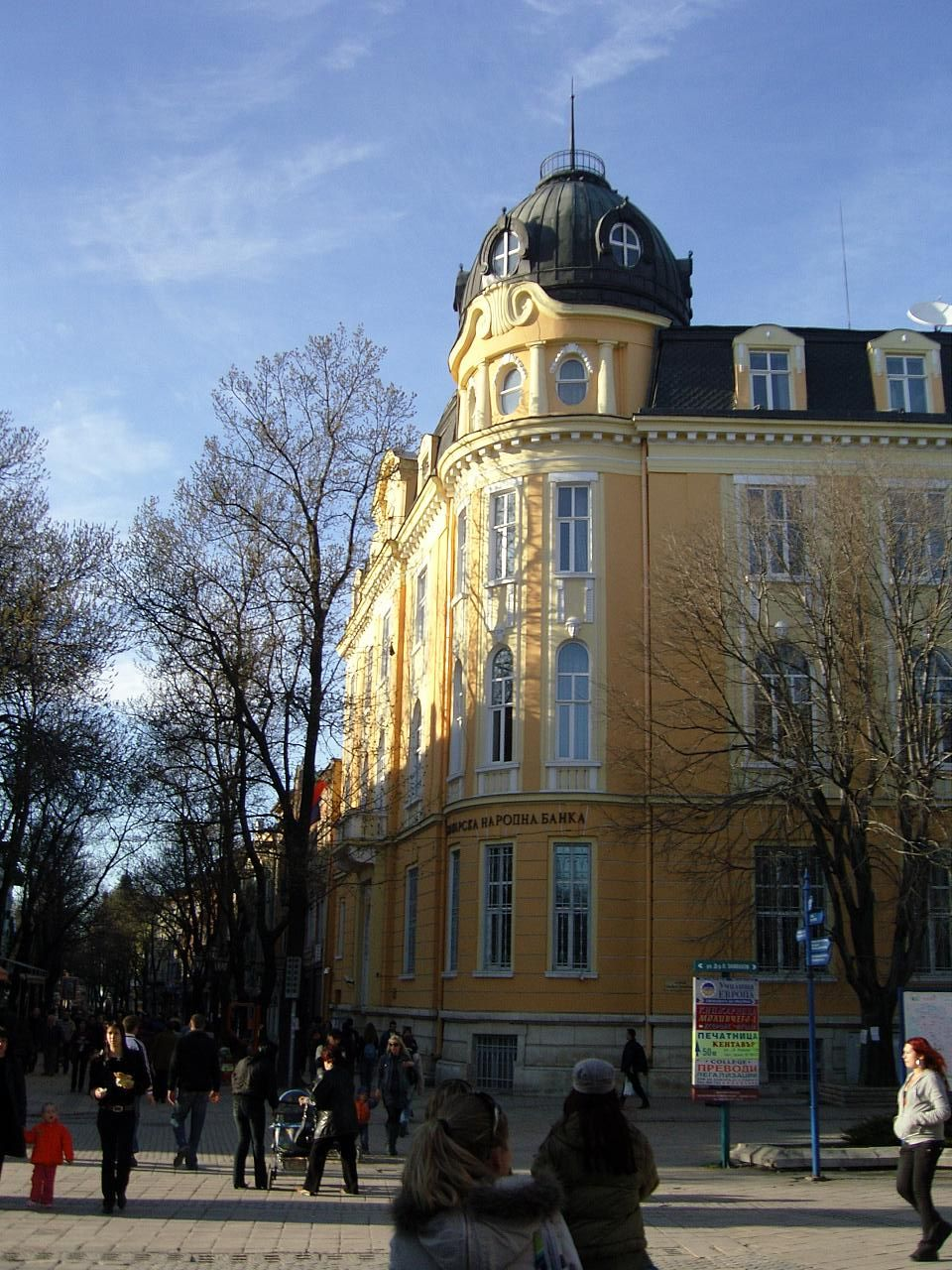
The central streets of Pleven

Numerous archaeological findings, among them the Nikolaevo treasure found in Bulgaria, evidence the rich culture of the Thracians, who inhabited the area for thousands of years.

In the beginning of the new era, the region became part of the Roman province of Moesia, and a road station called Storgosia arose near present-day Pleven on the road from Oescus (near modern Gigen) to Philippopolis (now Plovdiv). It later evolved into a fortress. One of the most valued archaeological monuments in Bulgaria from the period is the Early Christian basilica from the fourth century discovered near the modern city.

=== Middle Ages ===
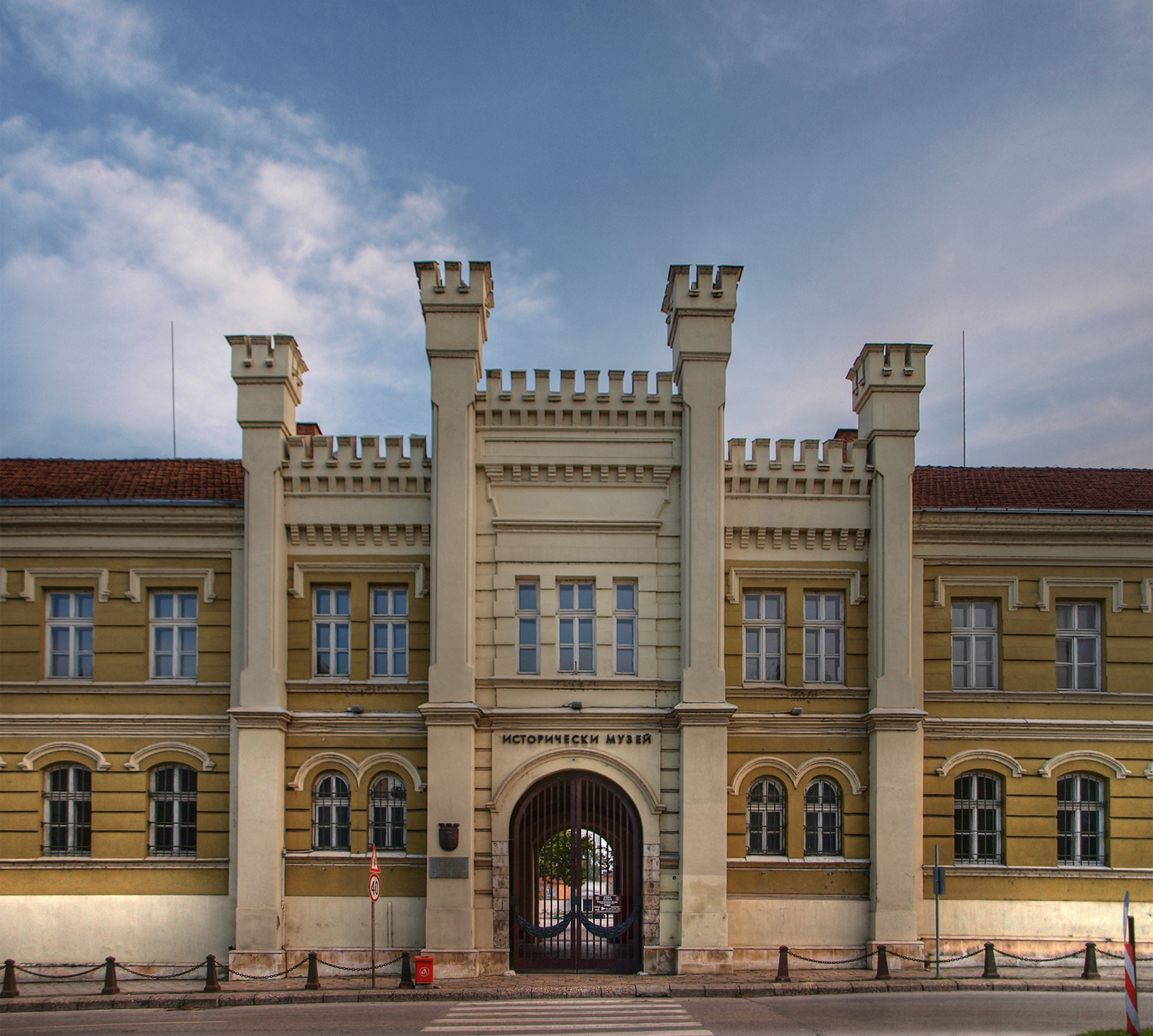
Pleven Regional Historical Museum

During the Middle Ages, Pleven was a well-developed stronghold of the First and the Second Bulgarian Empire. When Slavs populated the region, they gave the settlement its contemporary name Pleven, it was first mentioned in a charter by Hungarian king Stephen V in 1270 in connection to a military campaign in the Bulgarian lands.

=== Ottoman rule ===
During the Ottoman rule, Pleven, known as Plevne in Ottoman Turkish, preserved its Bulgarian appearance and culture. Many churches, schools and bridges were built at the time of the Bulgarian National Revival. In 1825, the first secular school in the town was opened, followed by the first girls' school in Bulgaria in 1840, as well as the first boys' school a year later. Pleven was the place where the Bulgarian national hero Vasil Levski established the first revolutionary committee in 1869, part of his national revolutionary network.

=== Siege of Plevna ===
The city (then mostly known as Plevna outside Bulgaria) was a major battle scene during the Russo-Turkish War of 1877–1878 that Russian Tsar Alexander II held for the purpose of the liberation of Bulgaria. The joint Russian and Romanian army paid dearly for the victory, but it paved the path for the defeat of the Ottoman Empire in this war, the restoration of Bulgaria as a state and the independence of Romania from the Ottoman Empire. It cost the Russians and Romanians 5 months and 38,000 casualties to take the town after four assaults, in what was one of the decisive battles of the war. The siege is remembered as a landmark victory of the Romanian War of Independence, as on 28 November 1877 the Plevna citadel capitulated, and Osman Pasha surrendered the city, the garrison and his sword to the Romanian Colonel Mihail Cerchez.

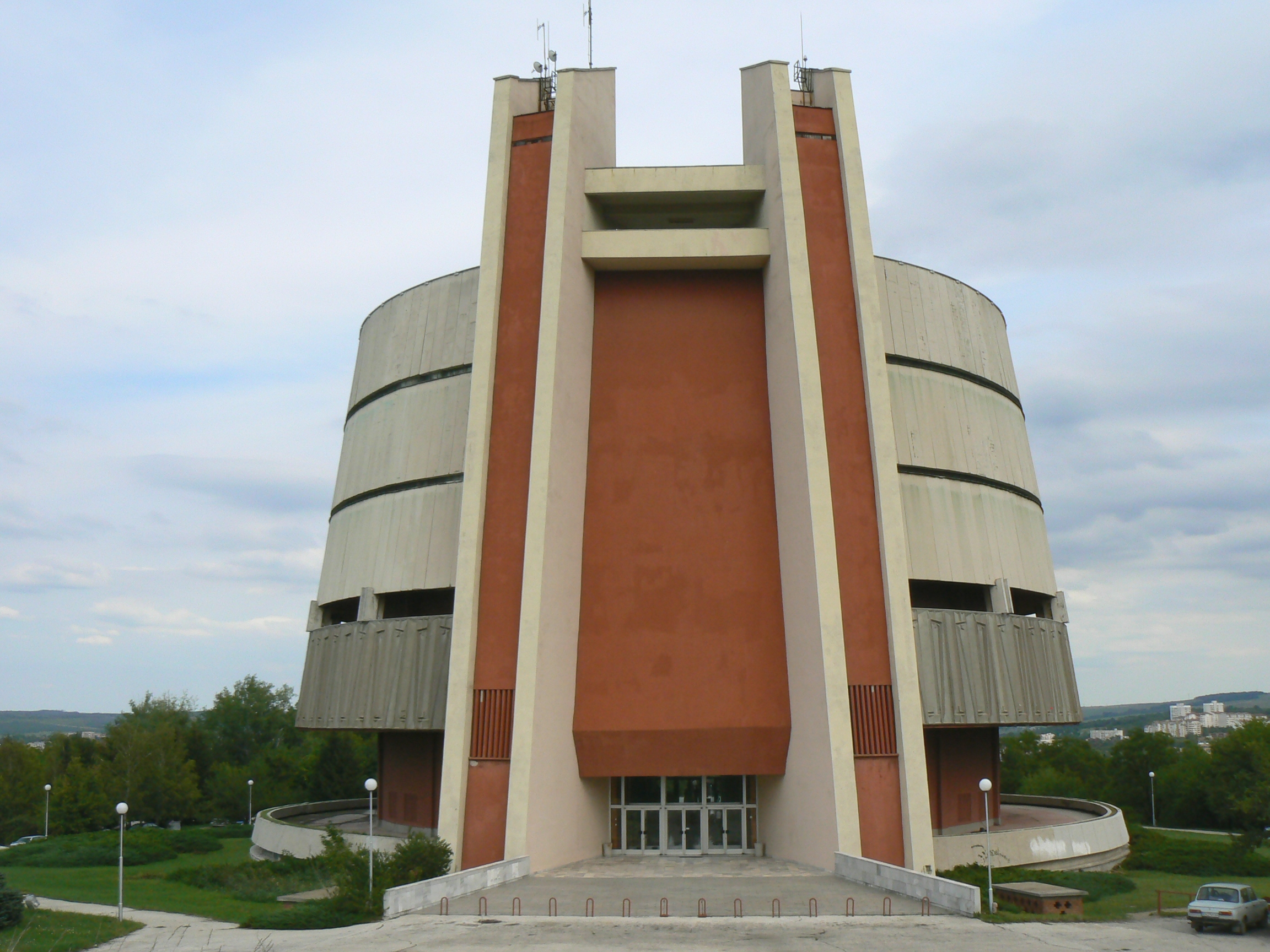
Pleven Panorama, one of the town's best known sights

In the Encyclopædia Britannica Eleventh Edition of 1911 J.H.V. Crowe concluded his lengthy entry on Pleven (transcribed as Plevna) with the memorable dictum:

Plevna is a striking example of the futility of the purely passive defence, which is doomed to failure however tenaciously carried out... Victories which are not followed up are useless. War without strategy is mere butchery.

On the other hand, the siege of Plevna stands out among other countless sieges and military actions in the region because of its significance.

Plevna is one of the few engagements that changed the course of history.

=== Modern history ===
The events of the Russo-Turkish War proved crucial for the development of Pleven as a key town of central northern Bulgaria. The town experienced significant demographic and economic growth in the following years, gradually establishing itself as a cultural centre of the region.

The Bulgarian Agrarian National Union, a leading interwar party representing the Bulgarian peasantry, was founded in the town in December 1899.

Prior to the Bulgarian orthographic reform of 1945, the name of the town was spelled Плѣвенъ (with yat) in Cyrillic.

== Population ==
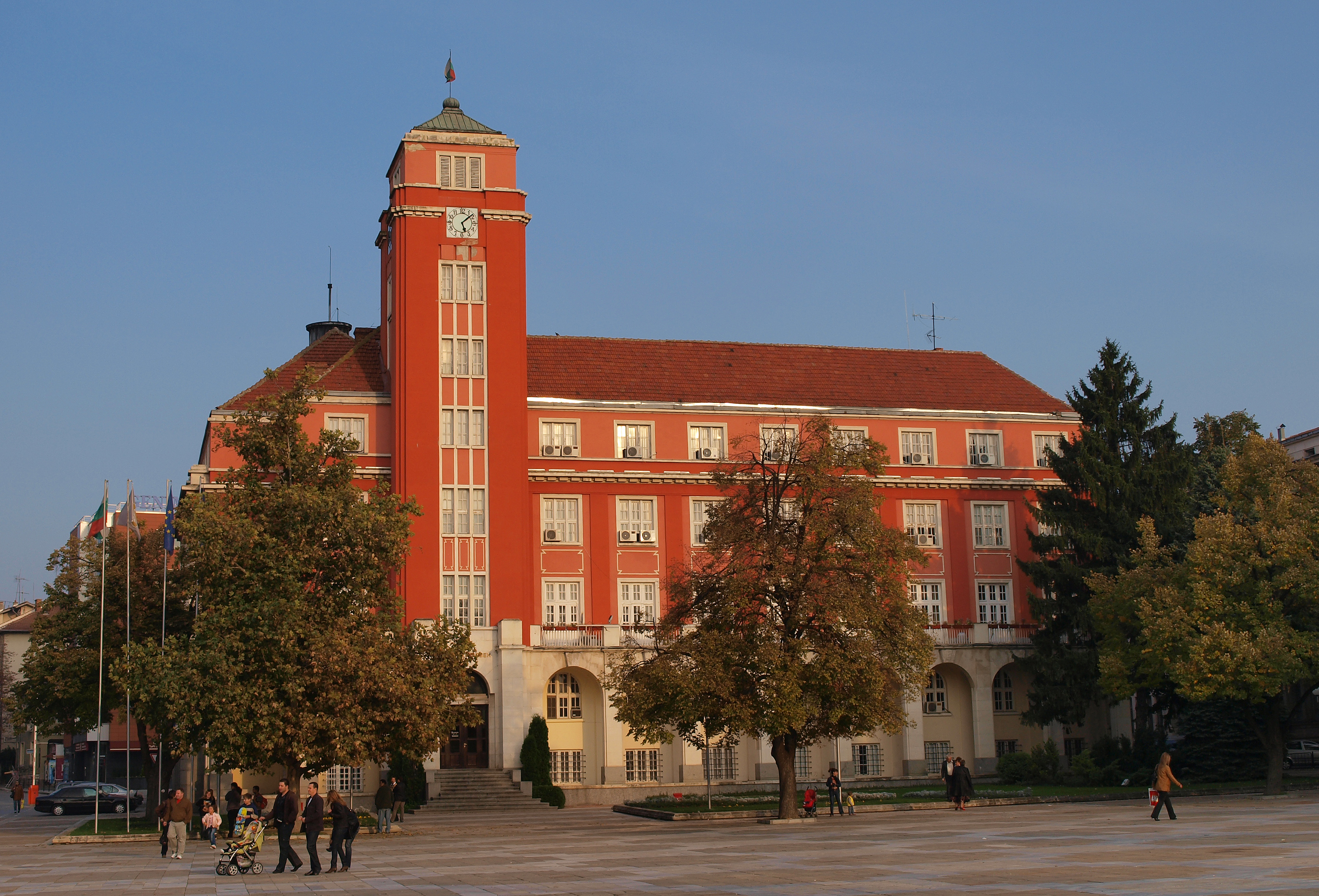
The town hall of Pleven

According to census 2021, Pleven has a population of 89,823 inhabitants as of December 2021. The ethnic breakdown is 97% Bulgarians among others. The number of the residents of the city reached its peak in the period 1988-1991 when exceeded 135,000.

Historical population
Year	Pop.	±%
1887	14,307	—
1910	23,049	+61.1%
1934	31,520	+36.8%
1946	39,059	+23.9%
1956	57,555	+47.4%
1965	78,666	+36.7%
1975	107,609	+36.8%
1985	129,766	+20.6%
1992	130,812	+0.8%
2001	121,880	−6.8%
2011	106,954	−12.2%
2021	91,119	−14.8%
2022	89,823	−1.4%
Source: Censuses

=== Ethnic, linguistic and religious composition ===
According to the 2011 census data, the individuals declared their ethnic identity were distributed as follows:

- Bulgarians: 95,386 (96.5%)
- Turks: 1,510 (1.5%)
- Gypsies: 1,017 (1.0%)
- Others: 489 (0.5%)
- Indefinable: 422 (0.4%)
  - Undeclared: 8,130 (7.6%)

Total: 106,954

In Pleven Municipality 112,414 declared as Bulgarians, 4626 as Gypsies, 3204 as Turks and 10,384 did not declare their ethnic group. Most Roma people in Pleven Municipality live in the village of Bukovlak (bg:Буковлък).

An overwhelming majority of 90% of Pleven's residents are Eastern Orthodox Christian. The Diocese of Nikopol, of which Pleven is part, is one of the two Roman Catholic dioceses in Bulgaria, and another 5% of the residents are Roman Catholic by faith, a significant number compared to other Bulgarian cities.

Pleven has three Eastern Orthodox churches, the Bulgarian National Revival St Nicholas Church (1834) that was constructed at the place of a chapel from the Second Bulgarian Empire, the St Paraskeva Church (1934) and the Holy Trinity Church, built in 1870 at the place of a church mentioned as early as 1523 and inaugurated by Exarch Antim I. As of 2005, a new Eastern Orthodox church is being built in the Strogoziya quarter.

The construction of a large Roman Catholic church of Our Lady of Fatima began in 2001. A mosque also exists in the town to serve the needs of the Muslim population, as well as a Methodist church that is situated on the site of the former local puppet theatre.

== Economy ==
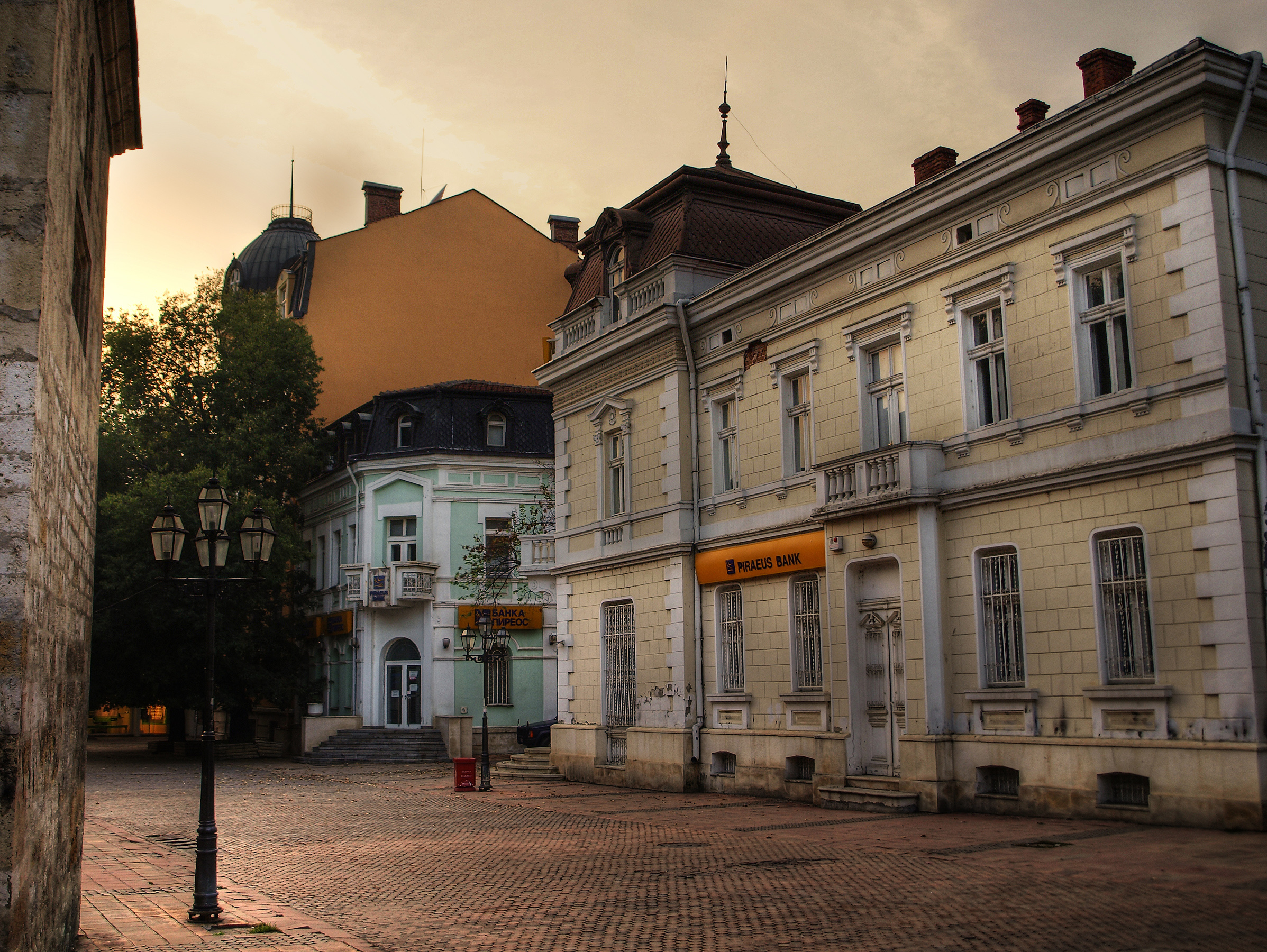
Two banks in central Pleven

A major centre of oil processing, metalworking, machinery construction, of light and food industries in Socialist times. However, the late 1990s and early 2000s saw a revival of light industry and the development of branches such as knitwear and store clothes production. Tourism, which had attracted many people from the Soviet Union prior to 1989, and had experienced a slump in the following years, is on the rise again.

In 2015, the unemployment rate in Pleven district was 9.2%.

The most important economic sectors in Pleven are chemical, textiles and foodstuffs industries, the manufacturing of cement and glass, machine building, tailoring, agriculture, retail and services. The city has seen a number of major foreign investments in the late 1990s and early 2000s. Particularly noticeable is the mass construction of hypermarkets, with two Billa, two Kaufland, two Carrefour, DM, Plus, ELEMAG, METRO, two LIDL stores, a Praktiker, HomeMax and a number of other hypermarkets being opened as of 2006. The Pleven City Center and Central Mall Pleven were opened in 2008. A new mall called ''Panorama mall'' was opened in 2014.

== Transport ==
The international railway Sofia — Bucharest — Moscow runs through Pleven. The international road E 83 passes just north of the city. The national A2 Hemus highway Sofia — Varna is projected to pass 16 km (10 mi) south of Pleven.

Over 90% of the inner city transportation in Pleven is maintained by trolleybuses. There are 14 trolleybus lines, and 75 km (47 mi) trolleybus network. The trolleybus fleet consist of ZIU-682 (1985–1988) and Skoda 26-TR Solaris trolleybuses, produced in 2014. A project for 12 km (7 mi) trolleybus routes extension is underway. When the extension is completed Pleven will become 100% covered by trolleybus transport.

== Transmitter ==
Near Pleven, there is a large facility for medium wave and short wave broadcasting. Pleven medium wave transmitter, working on 594 kHz, uses as antenna two 250 metres (820 feet) tall guyed mast radiators insulated against ground. These masts belong to the tallest structures of Bulgaria.

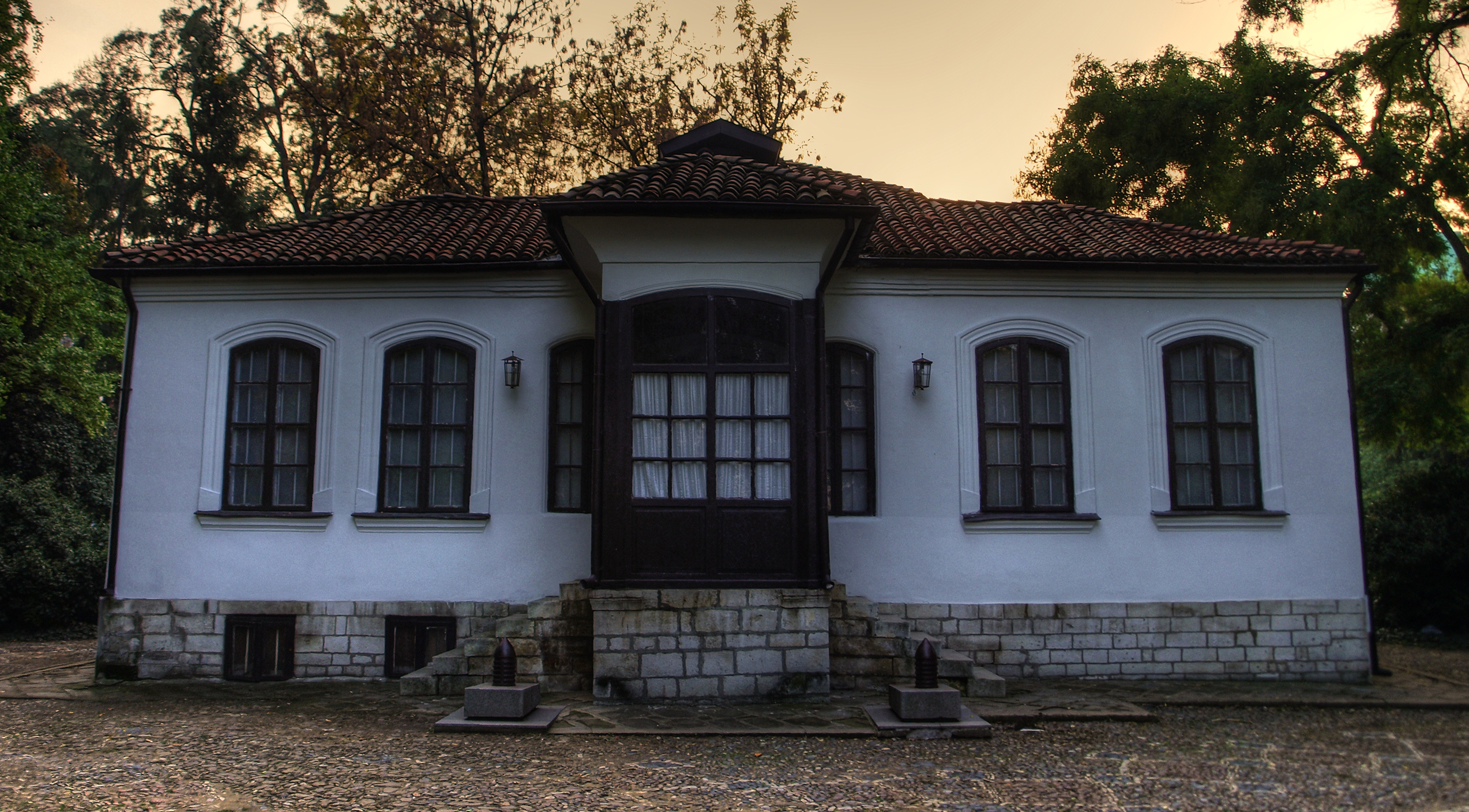
Museum of the Liberation of Pleven

== Main sights ==
Most of the sights of the town are related to the Russo-Turkish War. The monuments related to the war alone are about 200. Some of the more popular include the St George the Conqueror Chapel Mausoleum in honour of the many Russian and Romanian soldiers who lost their lives during the siege of Plevna and the ossuary in Skobelev Park. Another popular attraction is Pleven Panorama, created after (and reputedly larger than) the Borodino Panorama in Russia on the occasion of the anniversary of the siege of Plevna.

== Culture ==
The Pleven Regional Historical Museum is another popular tourist attraction, while the Svetlin Rusev Donative Exhibition, situated in the former public baths, exhibits works by Bulgarian artists, as well as noted Western European art figures.

The Ivan Radoev Dramatic Theatre is the centre of theatrical life in Pleven. A number of community centres (chitalishta) are also active in the city.

Medical University - Pleven, one of the five medical universities in Bulgaria, was established in 1974, aiming to expand the horizons, size and reputation of the City Hospital, founded in 1865.

== Sport and recreation ==
Pleven is often regarded as an important centre of sports in Bulgaria, with many noted Bulgarian sportspeople having been born and/or trained in the town, including Tereza Marinova and Galabin Boevski.

The city hosts two football clubs, Spartak Pleven and Belite orli, which have separate stadiums. Both teams play in the second Bulgarian league and haven't had any major successes in the past, although Spartak Pleven has been the first team for a couple of former Bulgarian internationals such as Plamen Getov.

Spartak Pleven is also a basketball team, a national championship winner in 1995 and national cup winner in 1996 (then named Plama Pleven). Other than that, the team is a regular first league participant.

Pleven is famous for its Kaylaka (where the ruins of the Storgosia fortification can be found) and Skobelev parks. The latter is home to the Pleven Panorama and is situated on the original location of the battle during the Russo-Turkish War.

== Notable people ==
- Ilia Beshkov, artist
- Detelin Dalakliev, boxer
- Dora Deliyska, classical pianist
- Lucy Diakovska, singer
- Emil Dimitrov, singer and composer
- Ghena Dimitrova, operatic soprano
- Silvia Dimitrova, artist
- Sabetay Djaen, rabbi
- Dionisii Donchev, artist
- Tereza Marinova, triple jump athlete, 2000 Summer Olympics gold medallist
- Svetlin Rusev, artist
- Slavi Trifonov, popular showman politician
- Svetla Vassileva, publicist and blogger
- Neviana Vladinova, rhythmic gymnast
- Alexander Litschev, academic

== International relations ==
=== Twin towns – sister cities ===
Pleven is twinned with:

- Agadir, Morocco
- Brăila, Romania
- Bitola, North Macedonia
- Bursa, Turkey
- Central Administrative Okrug (Moscow), Russia
- Charlottesville, United States
- Chernivtsi, Ukraine
- Edessa, Greece
- Gornji Milanovac, Serbia
- Jinzhou, China
- Kaiserslautern, Germany
- Kavadarci, North Macedonia
- Ponta Delgada, Portugal
- Płock, Poland
- Rostov-on-Don, Russia
- Segovia, Spain
- Volos, Greece
- Yangquan, China

== Honours ==
- A city in Kansas and a town in Montana in the United States, as well as a village in Ontario, Canada were named after Pleven, or more precisely its historical name in English Plevna, the reason for which is the battle in 1877.
- A road in Hampton, Middlesex, London is named Plevna, adjoining another called Varna Road both made up of Victorian terraced housing built in the 1870s and named after the battles in Bulgaria of the period.
- Pleven Saddle on Livingston Island in the South Shetland Islands, Antarctica is named after Pleven.
- In other countries there are five cities and towns named after Plevna, and eighteen Plevna streets in Britain alone
- In Romania, more than 10 large cities have a Plevna (Romanian for "Pleven") street, as Pleven was the location for an important battle between the Ottoman Empire on one side, and the Russian Empire and Romania on the other, after which Romania gained independence.

== Gallery ==
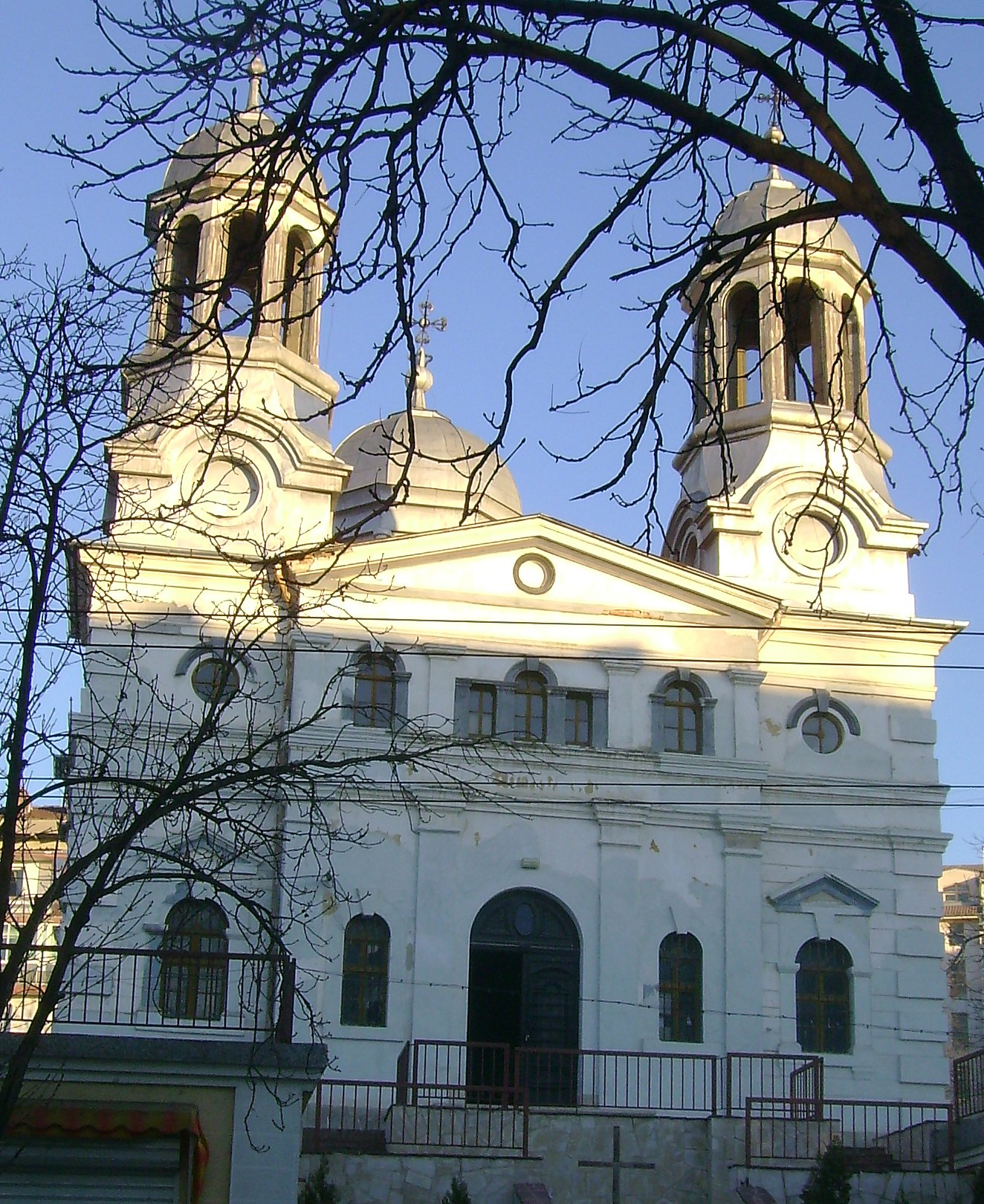
Holy Trinity Church

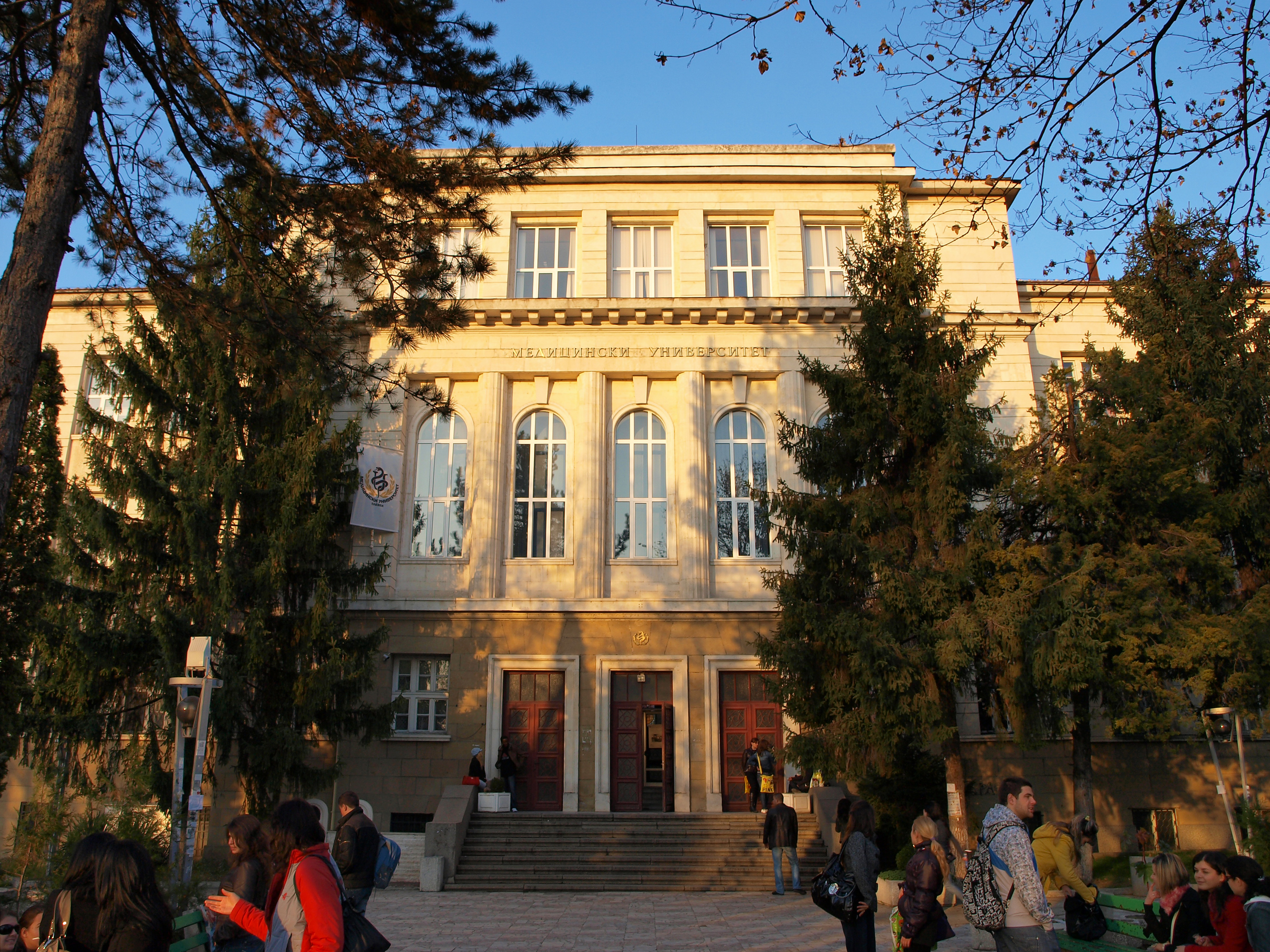
Medical University Pleven

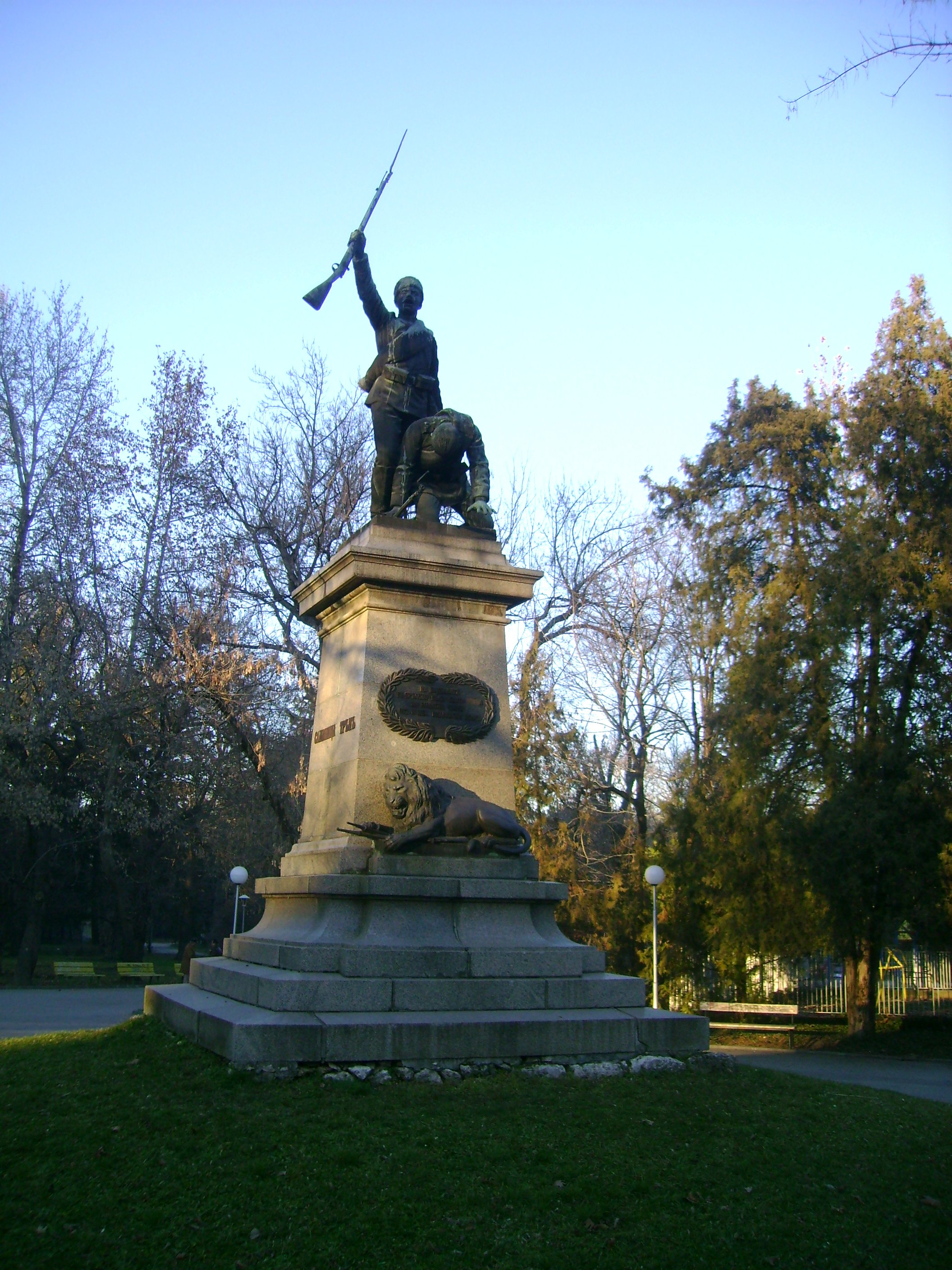
Pleven monument

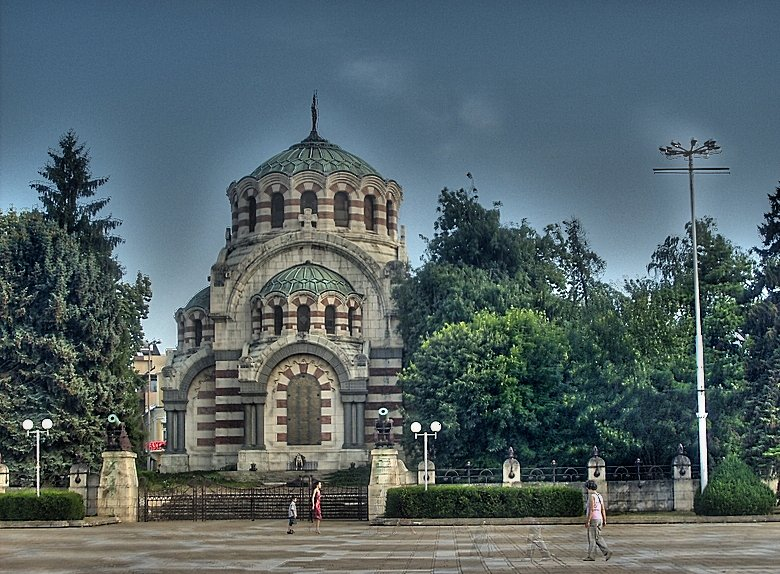
St George the Conqueror Chapel Mausoleum

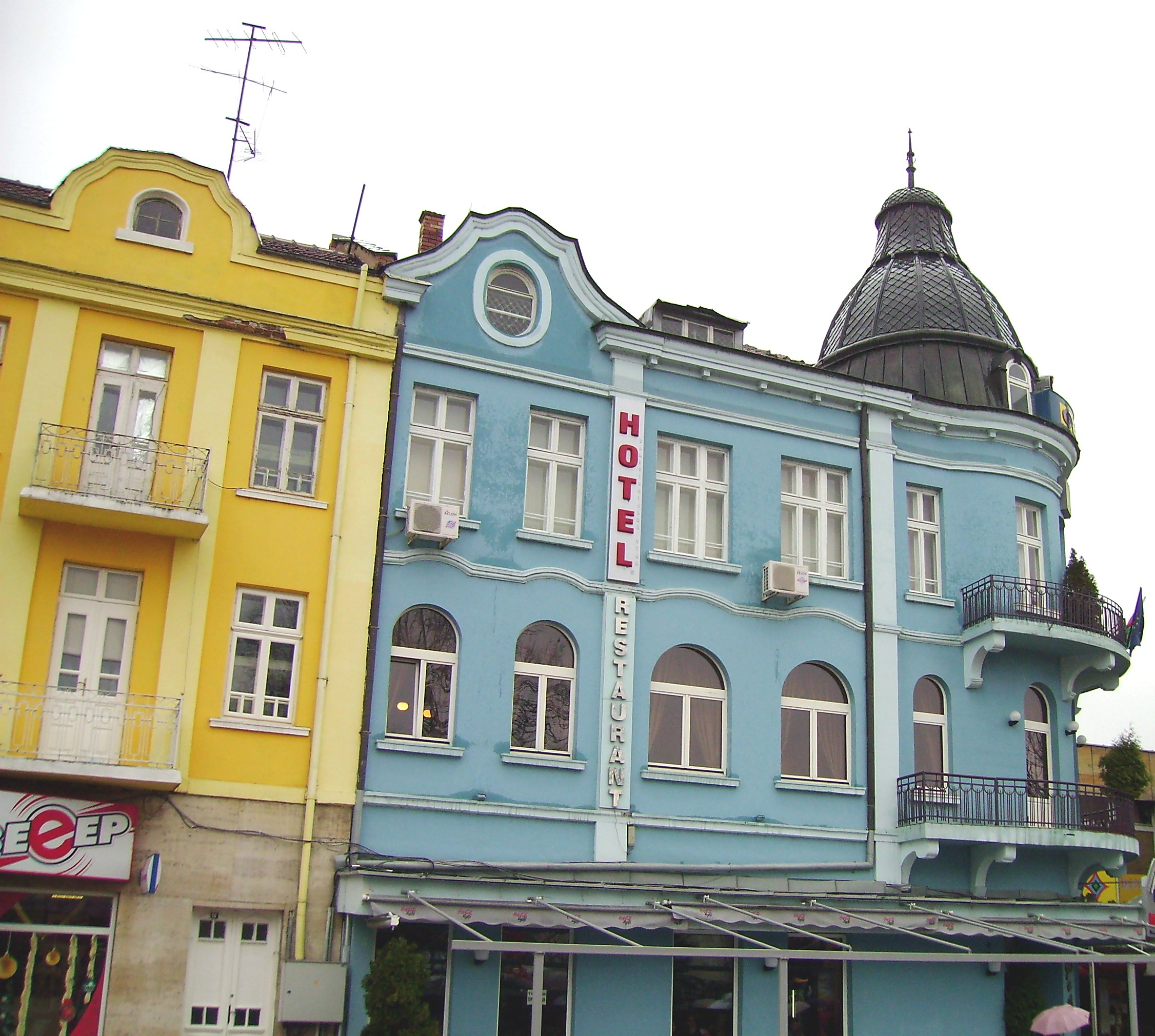

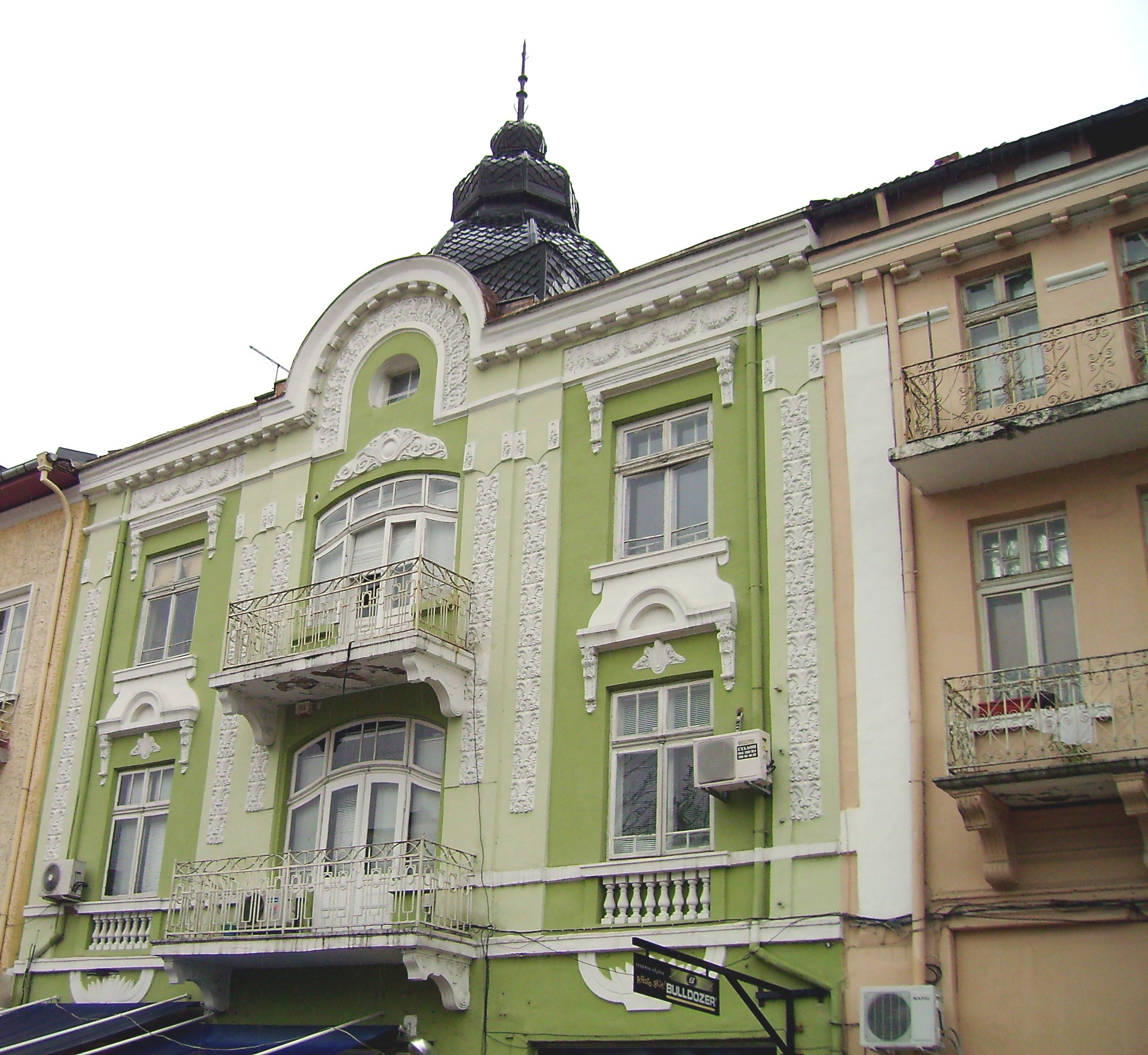

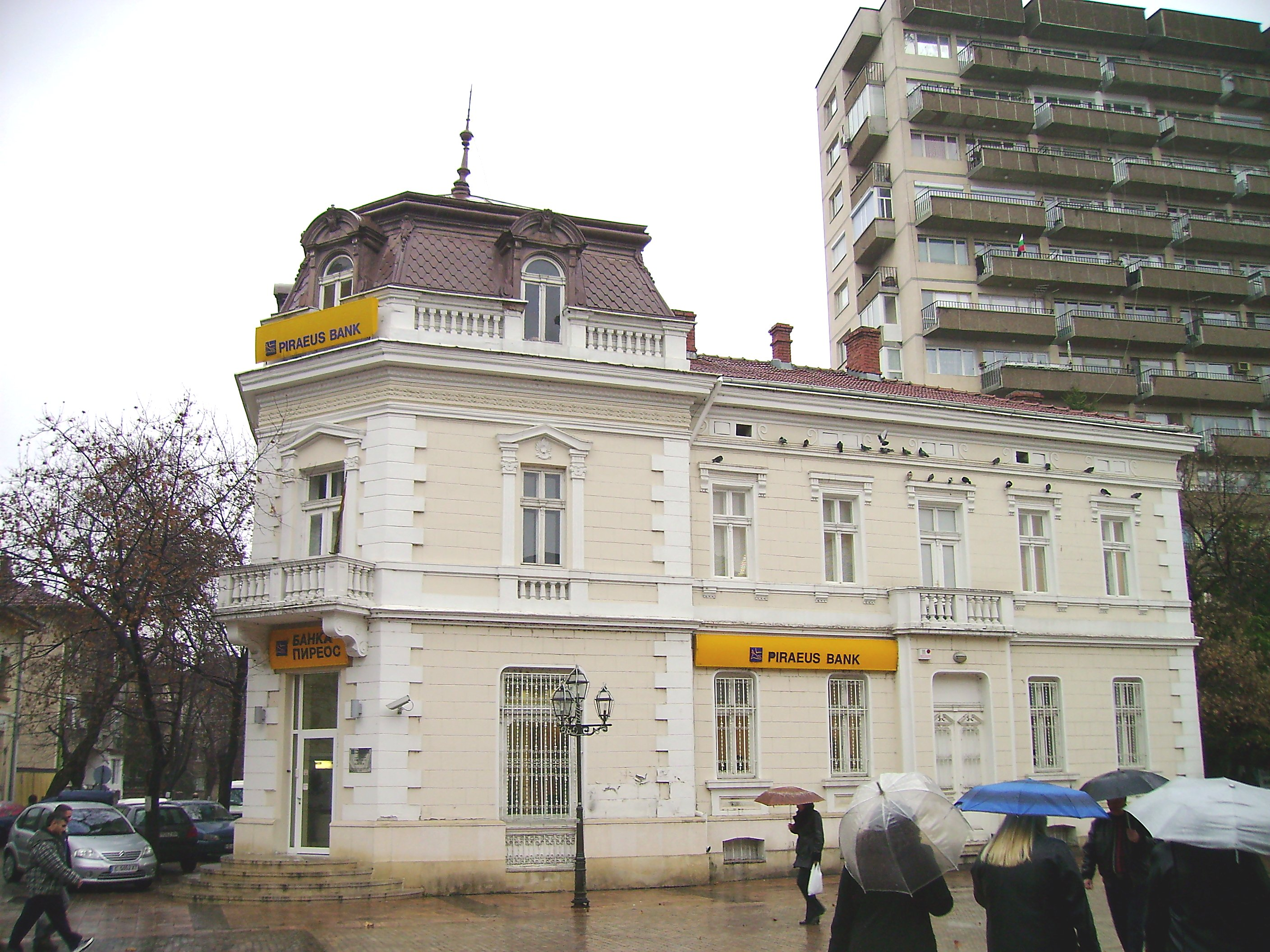

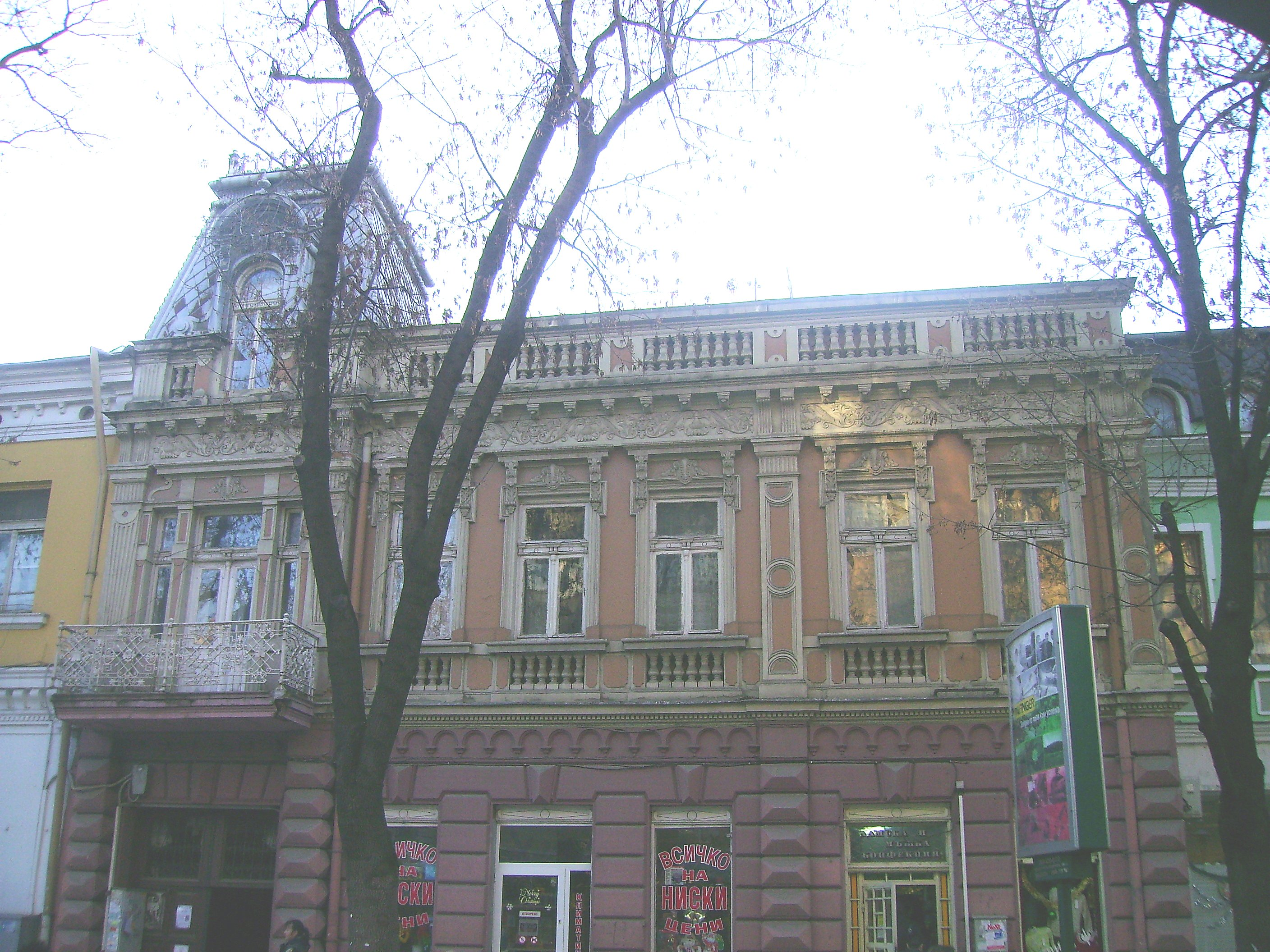

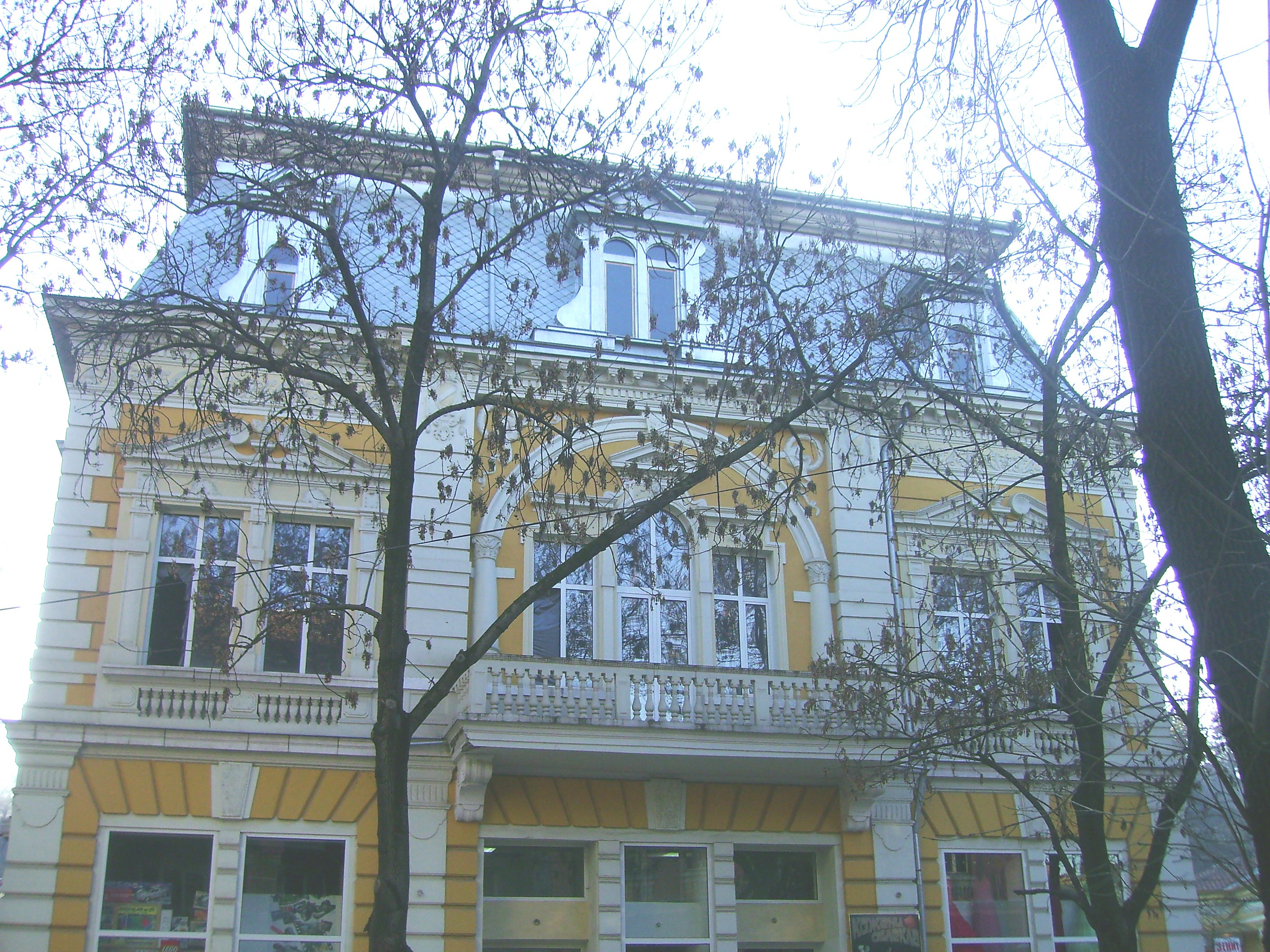

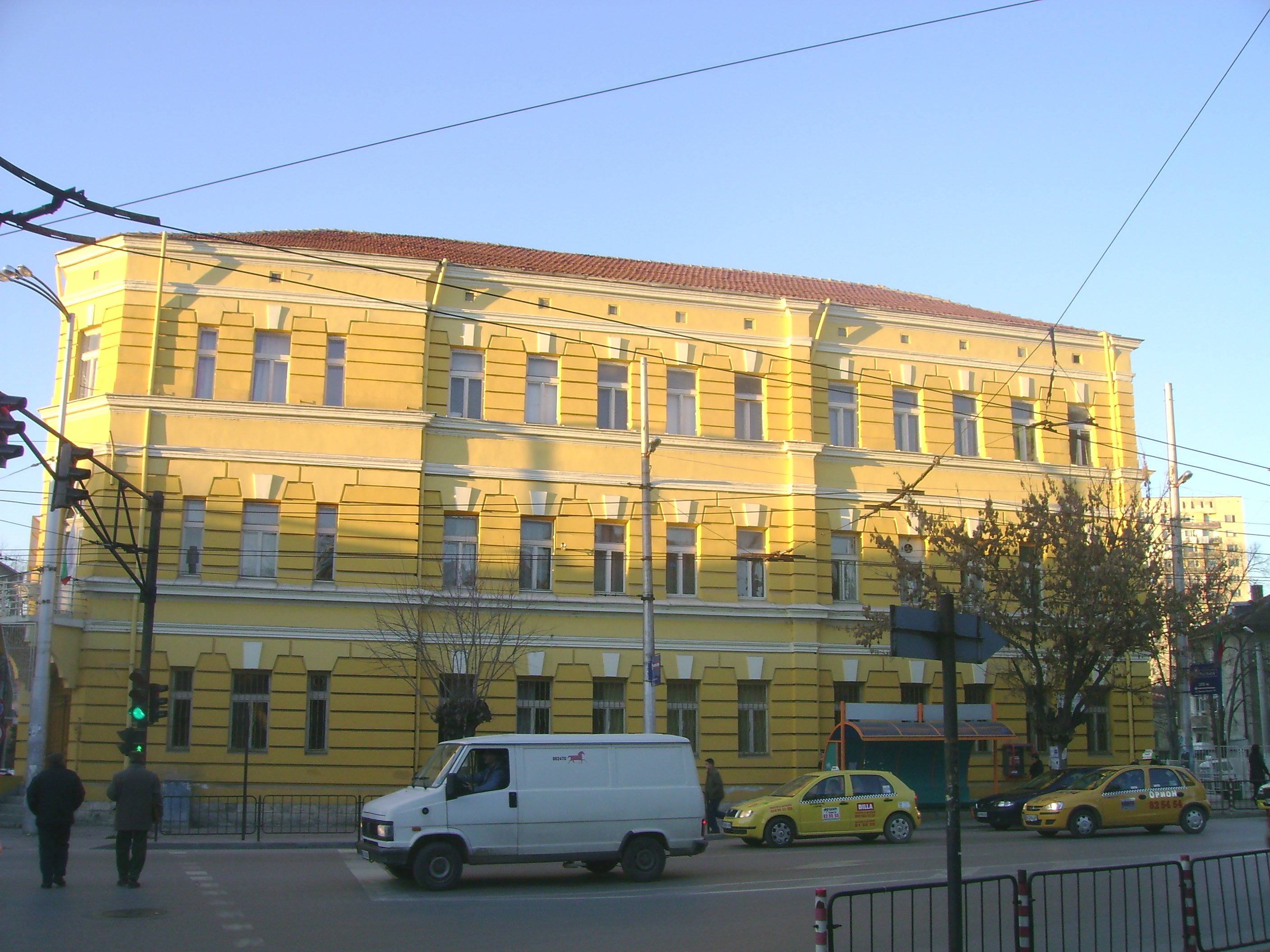

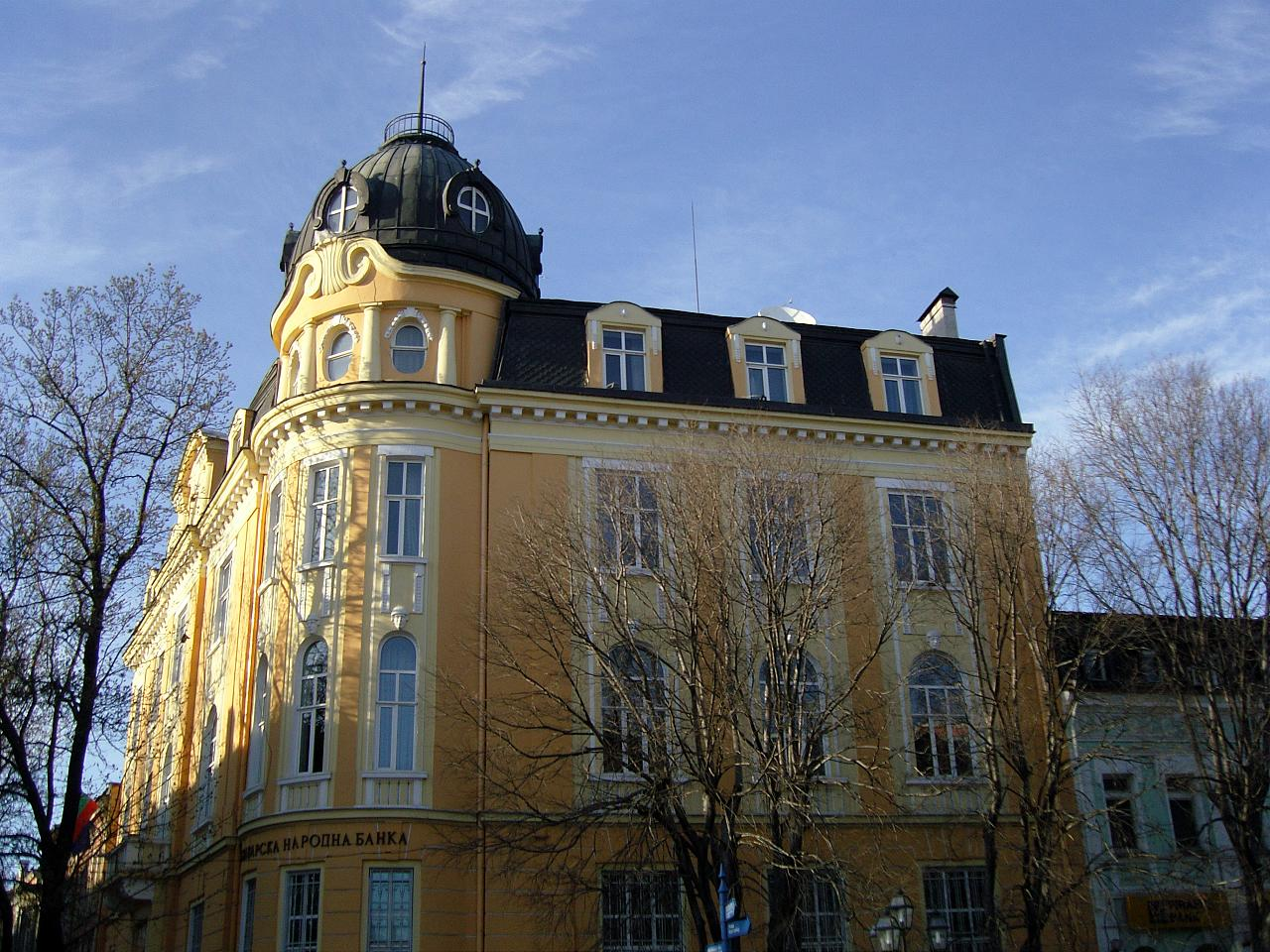

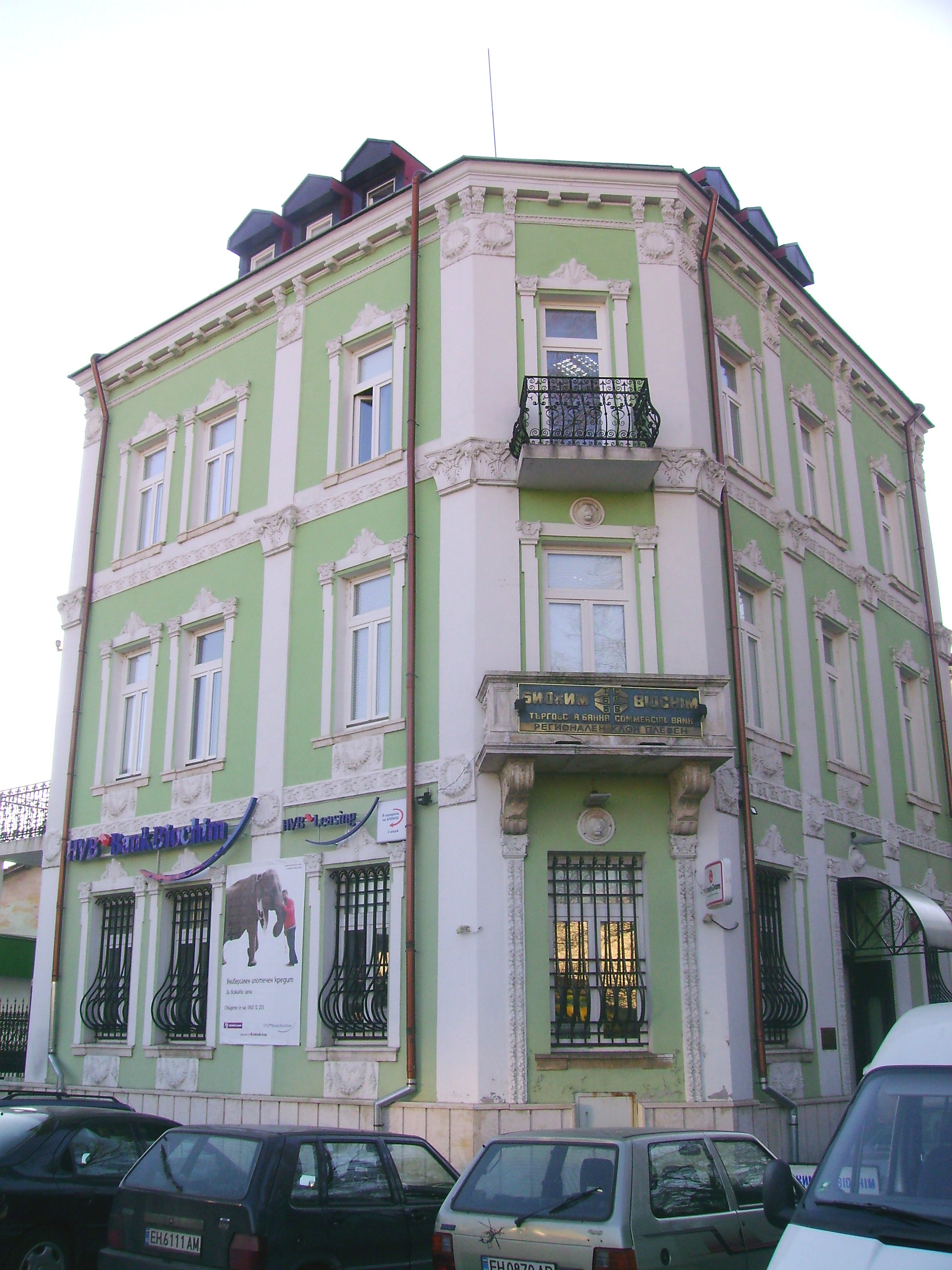

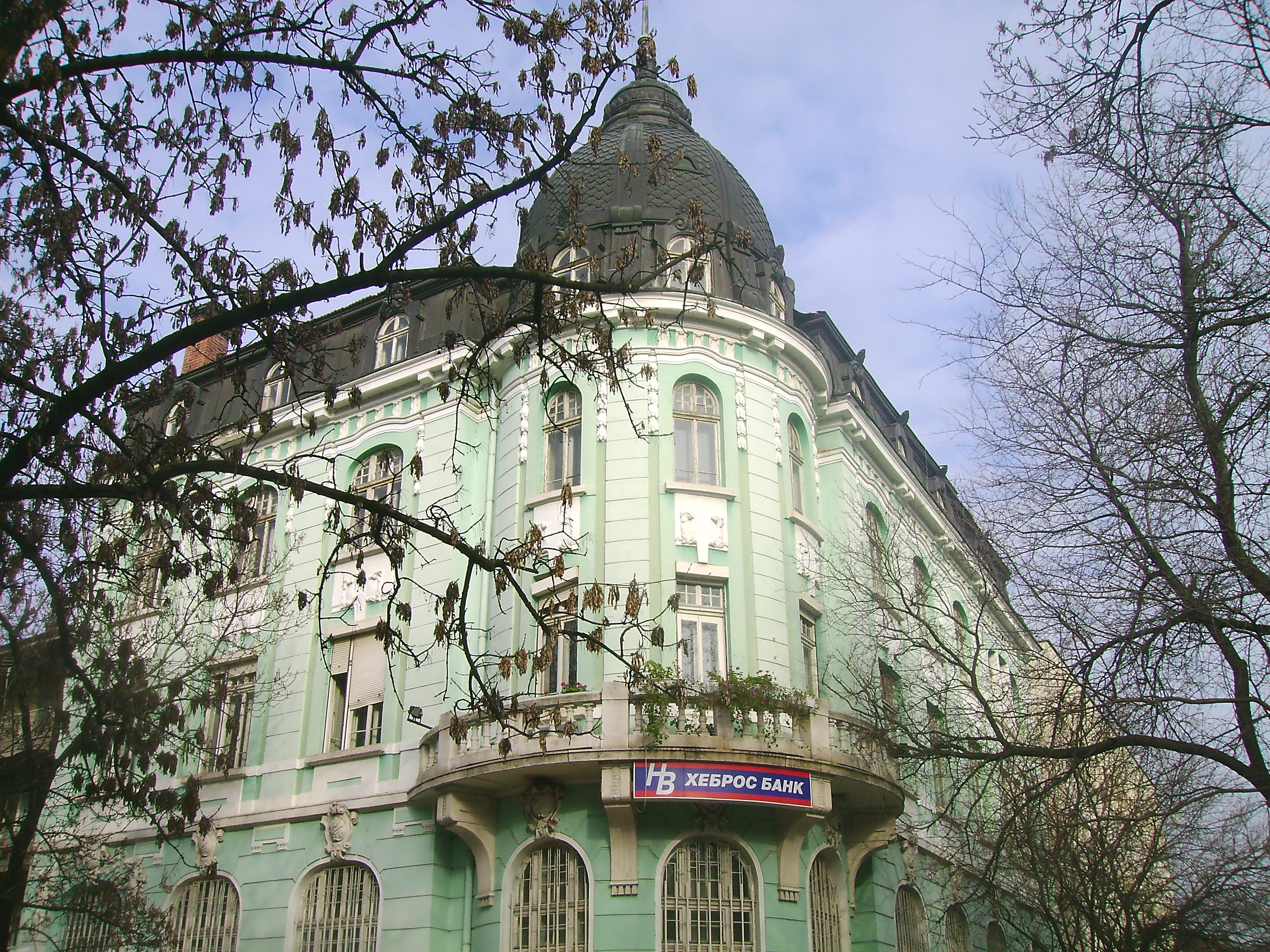

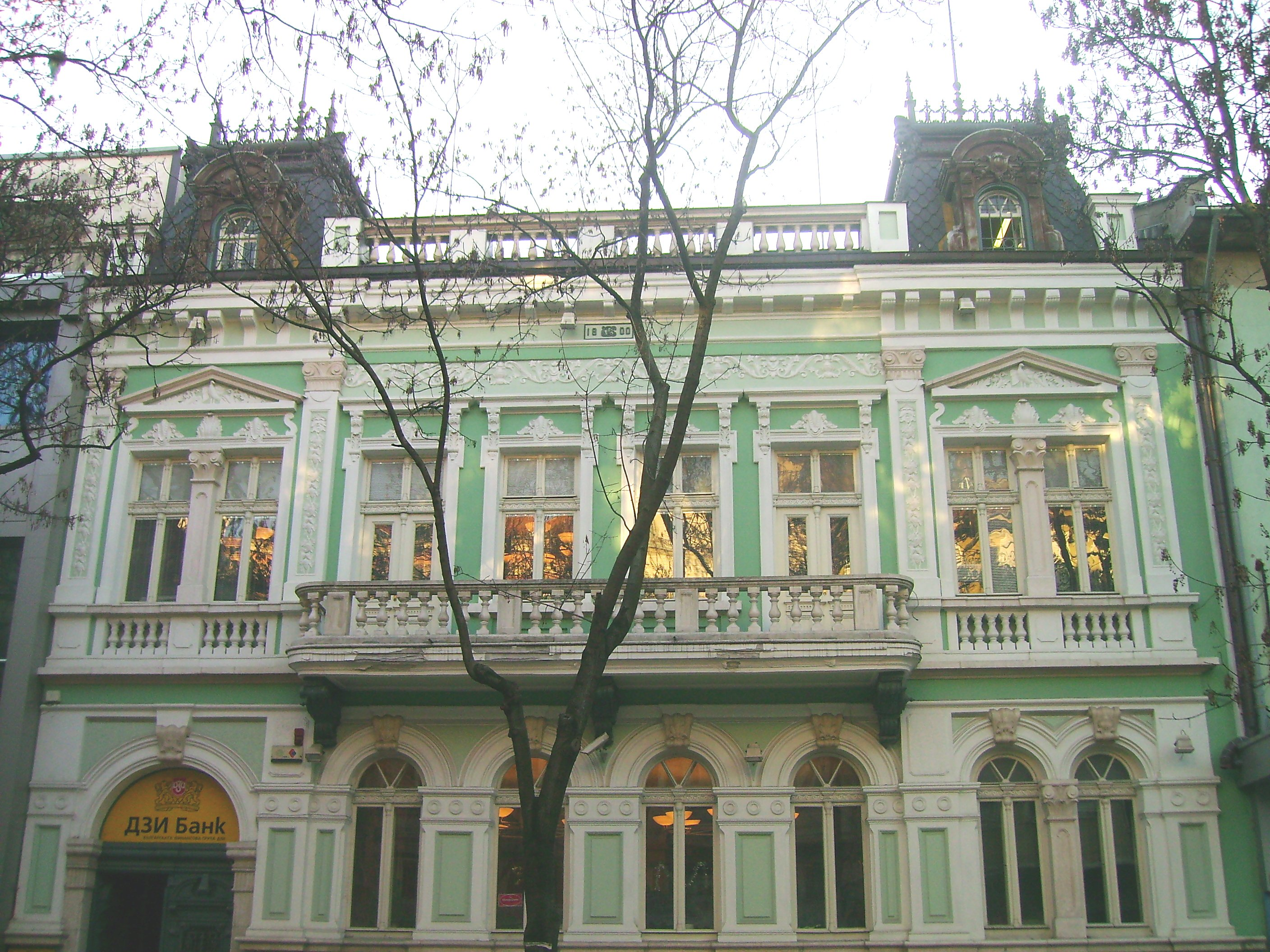

== See also ==
- List of cities and towns in Bulgaria
- Plama Pleven
- Dr. Georgi Stranski University Hospital
