= Storgosia =

Coordinates: 43°25′N 24°37′E

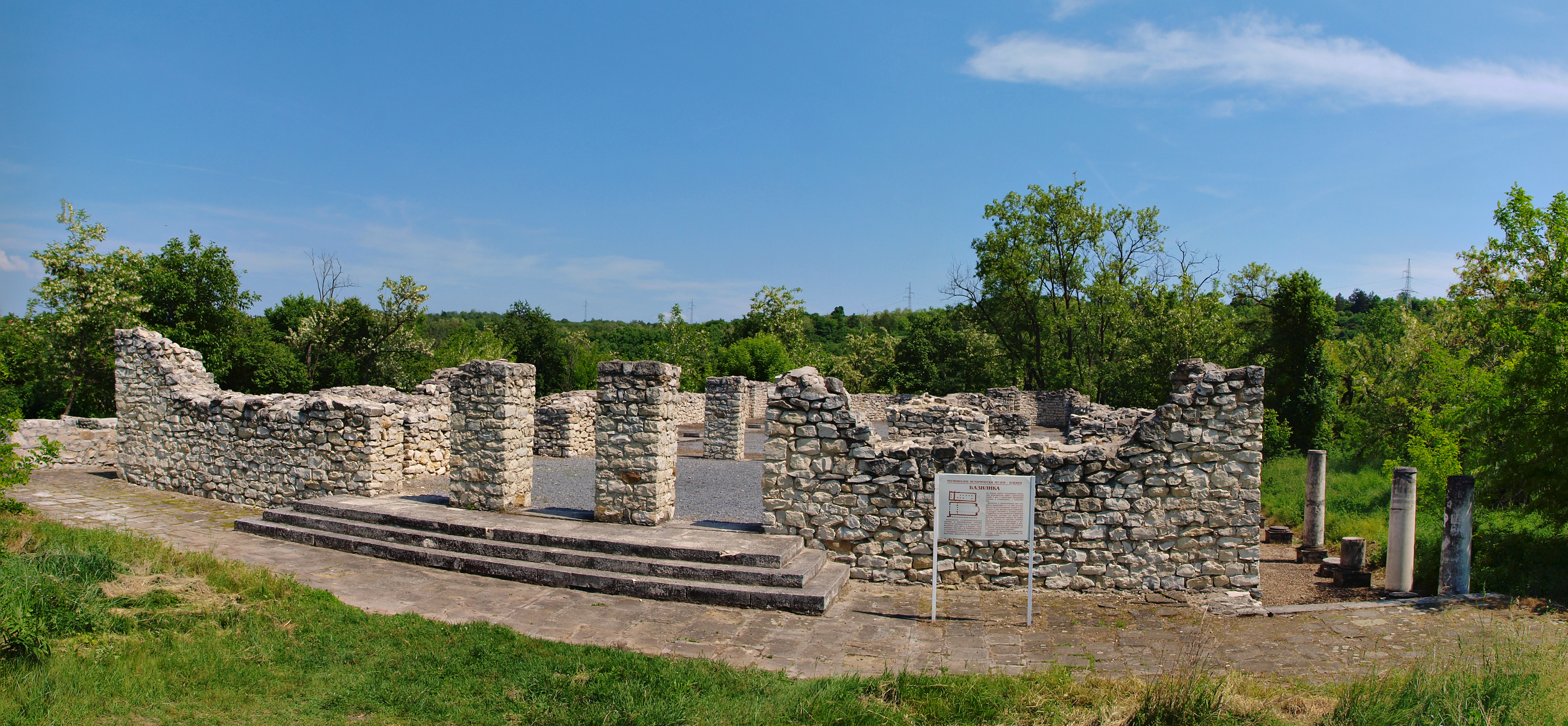
Overview of the late Roman basilica and adjacent ruins of Storgosia

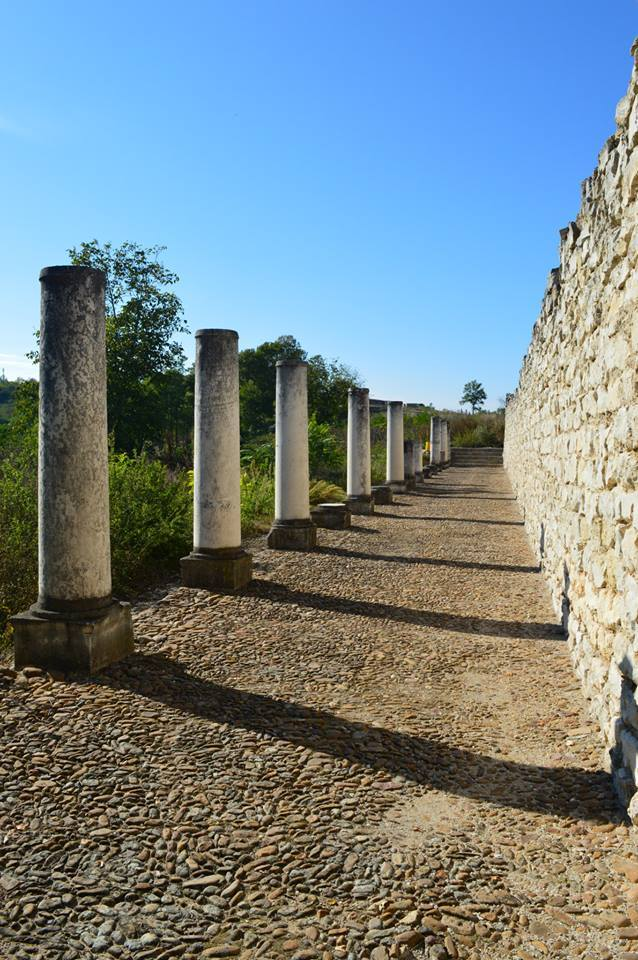

Storgosia was a Roman road station and later a fortress, located in the modern Kaylaka Park in the vicinity of modern Pleven (North-central Bulgaria).

It accommodated detachments of Legio I Italica's Novae (modern Svishtov) garrison. The station grew to become a fortress in Late Antiquity due to Gothic and other Barbarian raids after 238. At the beginning of the 4th century, 31,000 square metres (330,000 sq ft) were fortified with a defensive wall that was 2.20 metres (7.2 ft) wide. Archaeological excavations have also discovered two gates and three defensive towers, as well as residential buildings, a large 4th-century basilica of 45.20 by 22.20 metres (148.3 by 72.8 ft), and a public granary.

The fortress existed until the end of the 6th century, when the settlement of the Slavs apparently led to its abandonment and during the rule of the Ottoman Empire the fortress was practically destroyed (probably in the 16th century), so that the stones could be used for the construction of a wall around the Turkish barracks in Pleven.
