= Ivan Radoev Dramatic Theatre =

Coordinates: 43°24′45″N 24°36′57″E

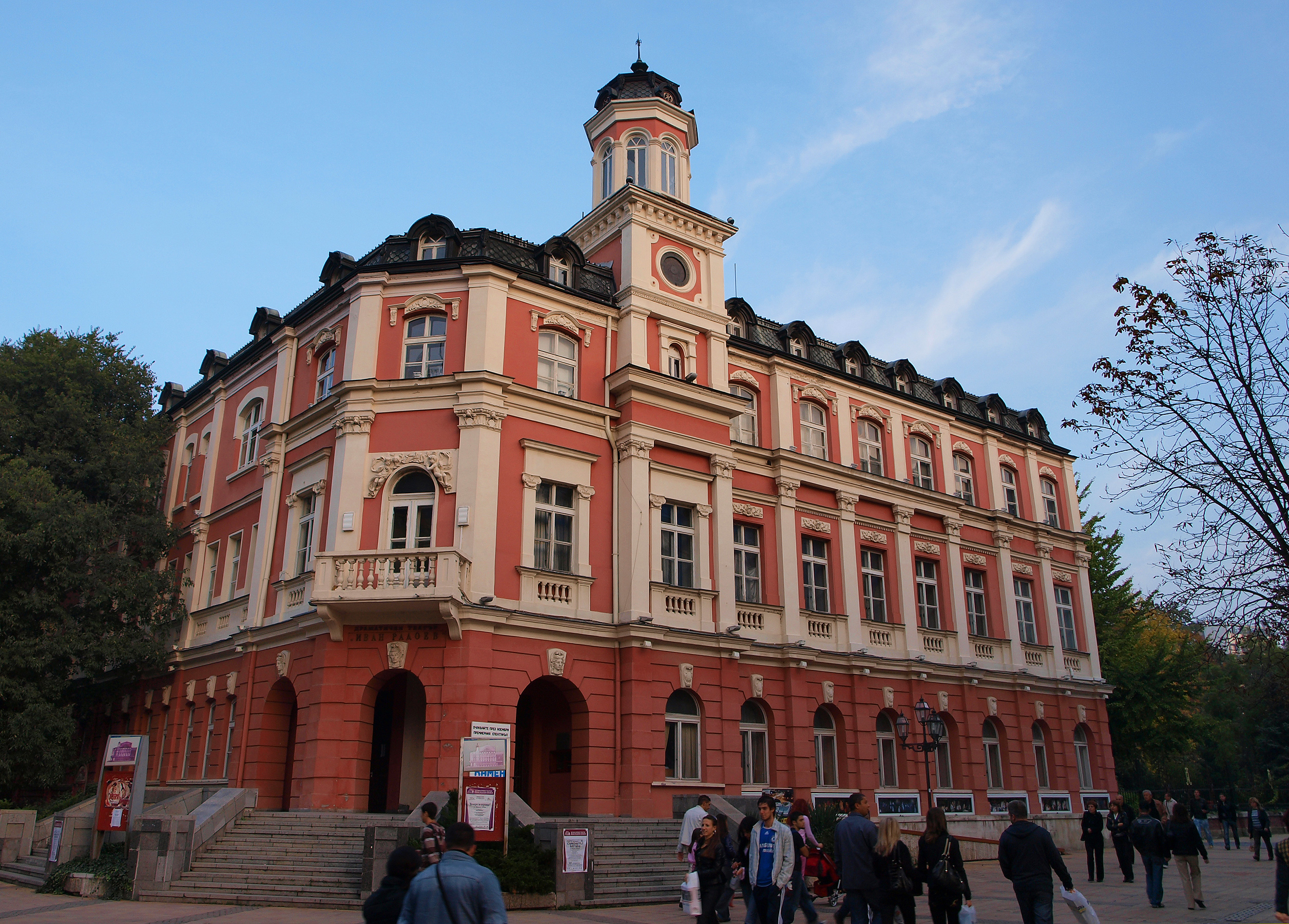
The Ivan Radoev Drama Theatre

The Ivan Radoev Dramatic Theatre (Bulgarian: Драматичен театър ”Иван Радоев”, Dramatichen teatar ”Ivan Radoev”) is a theatre in Pleven, Bulgaria. Its edifice in the centre of the city was designed by an Austro-Hungarian architect and built 1893–1895. The theatre was founded in 1918 as the Pleven Municipal Theatre, the first premiere being Kean by Alexandre Dumas, père (6 February 1919).
