= Kaylaka =

Protected area south of Pleven, Bulgaria

Coordinates: 43°23′7″N 24°37′40″E

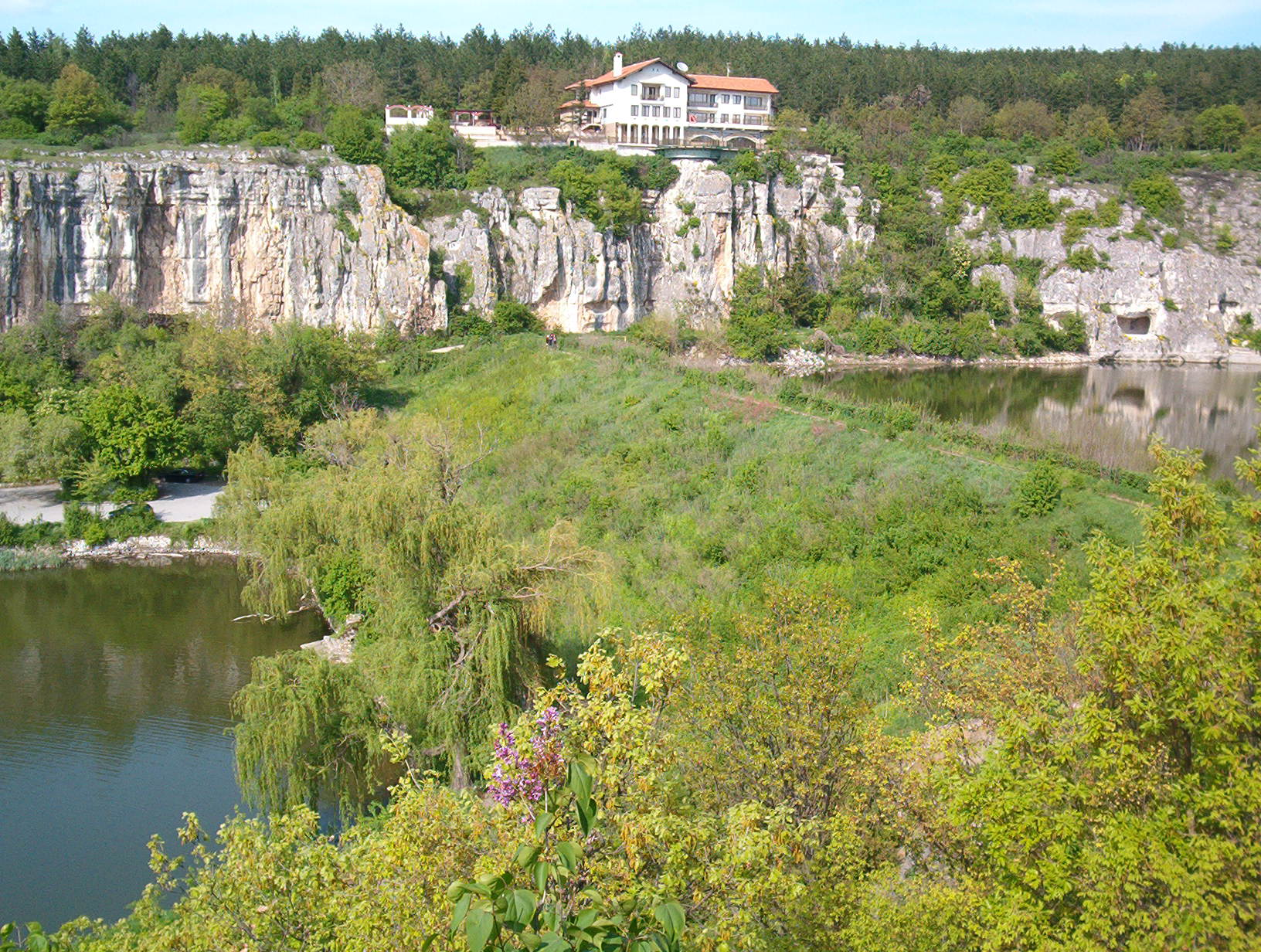
The two reservoirs

Kaylaka (Bulgarian: Кайлъка [kɐjˈɫɤkɐ]) is a large park and protected area south of Pleven, Bulgaria, situated in a Karst valley. The park is spread over 10 km^{2} and is surrounded by sheer cliffs that suggest favourable conditions for rock climbing. The ruins of the Roman fortress of Storgosia are located in Kaylaka, as well as ponds and reservoirs with boats and pedalos, a swimming pool, hotels, cafés, restaurants, discothèques and playgrounds.

The place is suitable for different outdoor activities including jogging, cycling, kayaking, rock climbing, fishing, and many others.

Kaylaka is masterfully modeled by nature. It is located on about 10 thousand cedars in the karst valley of the river Touchenitsa. For centuries the river has cut through the limestone rocks and formed a small gorge with parallel vertical cliffs, 20-30 meters high from each other at a distance of 100-150 meters. The natural canyon of the river is home to rich and diverse flora and fauna, where plants unique to Bulgaria and the Balkan Peninsula are found, and many of the birds and mammals are included in the Red Book of Bulgaria. Prehistoric animals and creatures lived there millions of years ago, and fossils of ancient aquatic organisms can still be seen in most limestone cliffs. With the naked eye you can see the decline of the world's oceans over the millennia as shaped floors on the rocks and many caves. Himalayan pines, rare in Bulgaria, grow in the central part of the park. And inside is a small grove planted with evergreen Lebanese cedar. Huge chestnuts bloom and smell on both sides of the central alley. These and other diverse tree species enrich the landscape of the park.

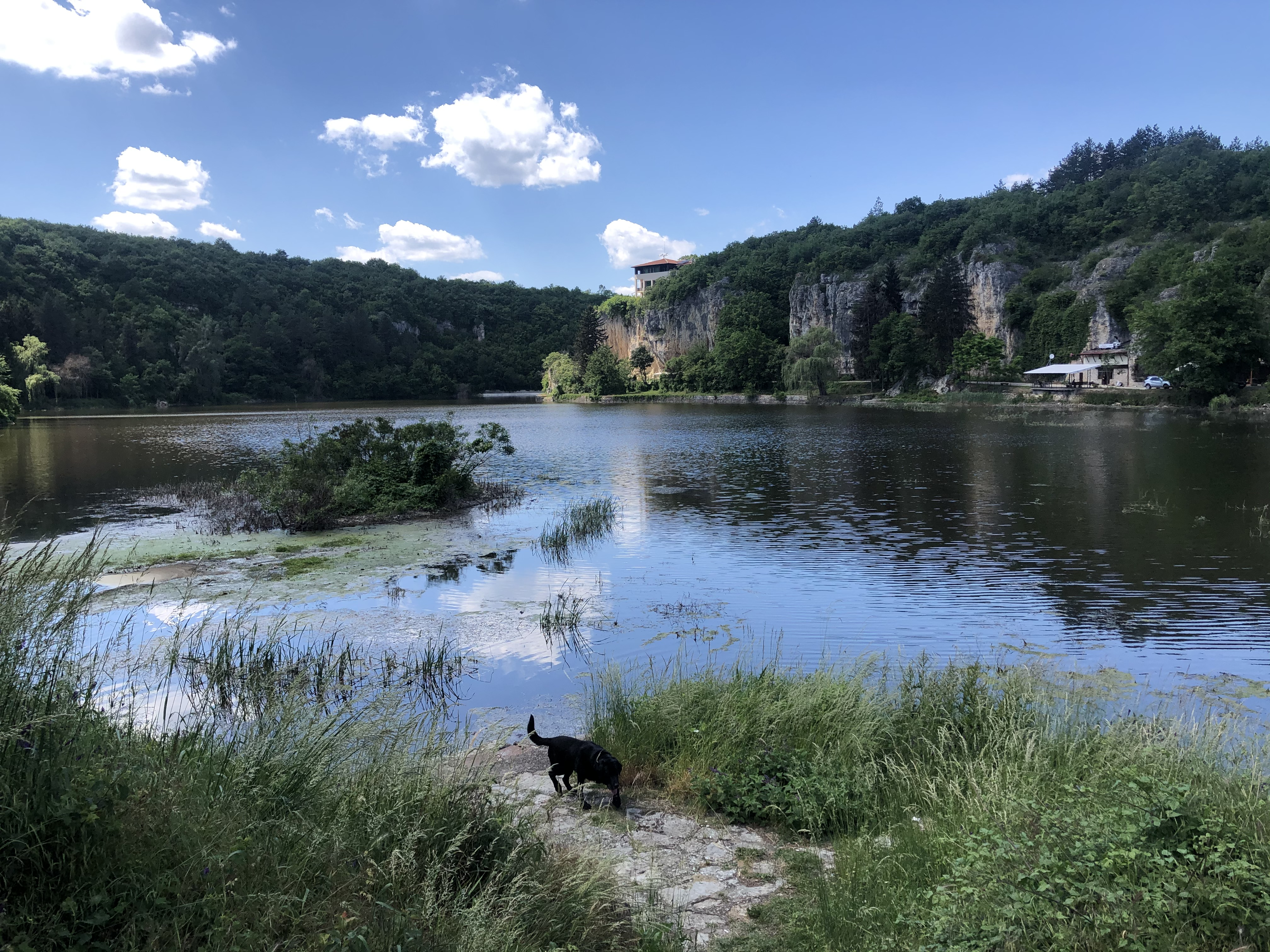
Kaylaka Dams

Arguably the most important figure with connection to the park is General Lieutenant Ivan Vinarov, the first chairman of an initiative committee which set up the Kaylaka People's Park at the place of the Sokol Hunting Park in 1946. Under Vinarov the protected park territory was enlarged almost four times and several reservoirs were constructed.

The park's name stems from the Ottoman Turkish kayalık, meaning "a rocky place".
