= Skobelev =

Skobelev may refer to:

- Fergana, a city in Uzbekistan, called Skobelev between 1907 and 1920
- Skobelev Park, a museum park in the vicinity of Pleven, Bulgaria

== Persons with the surname ==
- Matvey Skobelev (1885–1938), Russian revolutionary and politician
- Mikhail Skobelev (1843–1882), Russian general
- Vladislav Skobelev (born 1987), Russian cross-country skier
