= Pleven Panorama =

Panorama in Pleven, Bulgaria

Coordinates: 43°23′55″N 24°36′22″E

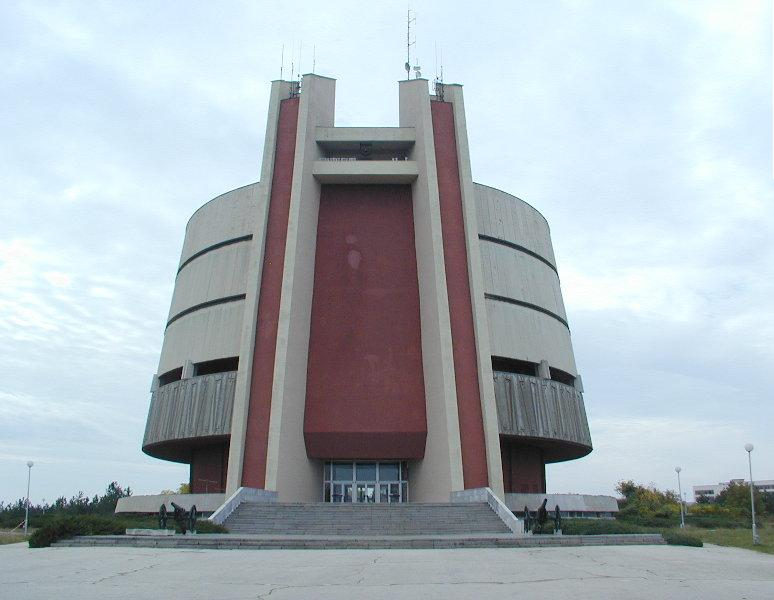
Pleven Panorama from the outside

Pleven Epopee 1877, more commonly known as Pleven Panorama, is a panorama located in Pleven, Bulgaria, that depicts the events of the Russian-Turkish War of 1877–78, specifically the five-month Siege of Plevna (Pleven Epopee) which made the city internationally famous and which contributed to the Liberation of Bulgaria after five centuries of Ottoman rule.

The panorama was created by 13 Russian and Bulgarian artists and was constructed in honor of the 100th anniversary of the Pleven Epopee and was officially unveiled on 10 December 1977. The panorama expanded the already existing Skobelev Park, which is the site of three of the four major battles which led to the liberation of Bulgaria. In the first three years after its opening, 2.5 million people visited the panorama. The monument is one of nearly 200 built by the people of Pleven in tribute to the battle and to the nearly 35,000 lives lost.

== Siege of Plevna ==
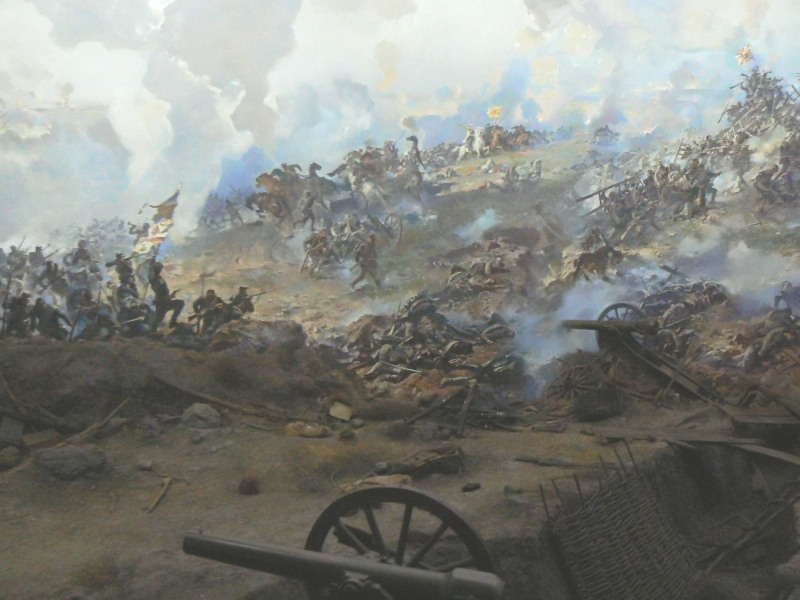
A detail of the siege in the interior of the panorama

The Pleven Panorama depicts the events of the Siege of Plevna, which consisted of four major battles over a five-month period (20 July–10 December 1877), focusing on the third battle. The siege was pivotal in the outcome in the Russo-Turkish War of 1877–78, which eventually resulted in the liberation of Bulgaria as well as Serbia and Romania from 500 years of Ottoman control.

At the time, Plevna was under Turkish control as Field Marshal Osman Pasha had set up fortifications there following his defeat at the Nikopol on 16 July. Osman was successful at fending off the Russian attacks on them during the first two battles. In the third battle, which began on 31 August and culminated on 11 September 1877, Russian forces under the command of General Mikhail Skobelev took two Turkish redoubts and a Romanian division took a third, the Grivitsa redoubt. Osman's troops were able to recapture the two redoubts taken by the Russians, but they were unable to dislodge the Romanians from Grivitsa.

This battle was the bloodiest for the Russian forces, with roughly 20,000 losses, but was also the turning point in the Siege. By 24 October, Russian and Romanian forces had surrounded Plevna. Osman requested permission to retreat, but the Ottoman high command would not allow him to do so. On 9 December Osman and his troops made a brief sally, defeated after initial success and incurring losses of 5,000 men. Osman was wounded. The next day, Osman surrendered the city to Romanian colonel Mihail Cerchez.

== Construction and unveiling ==
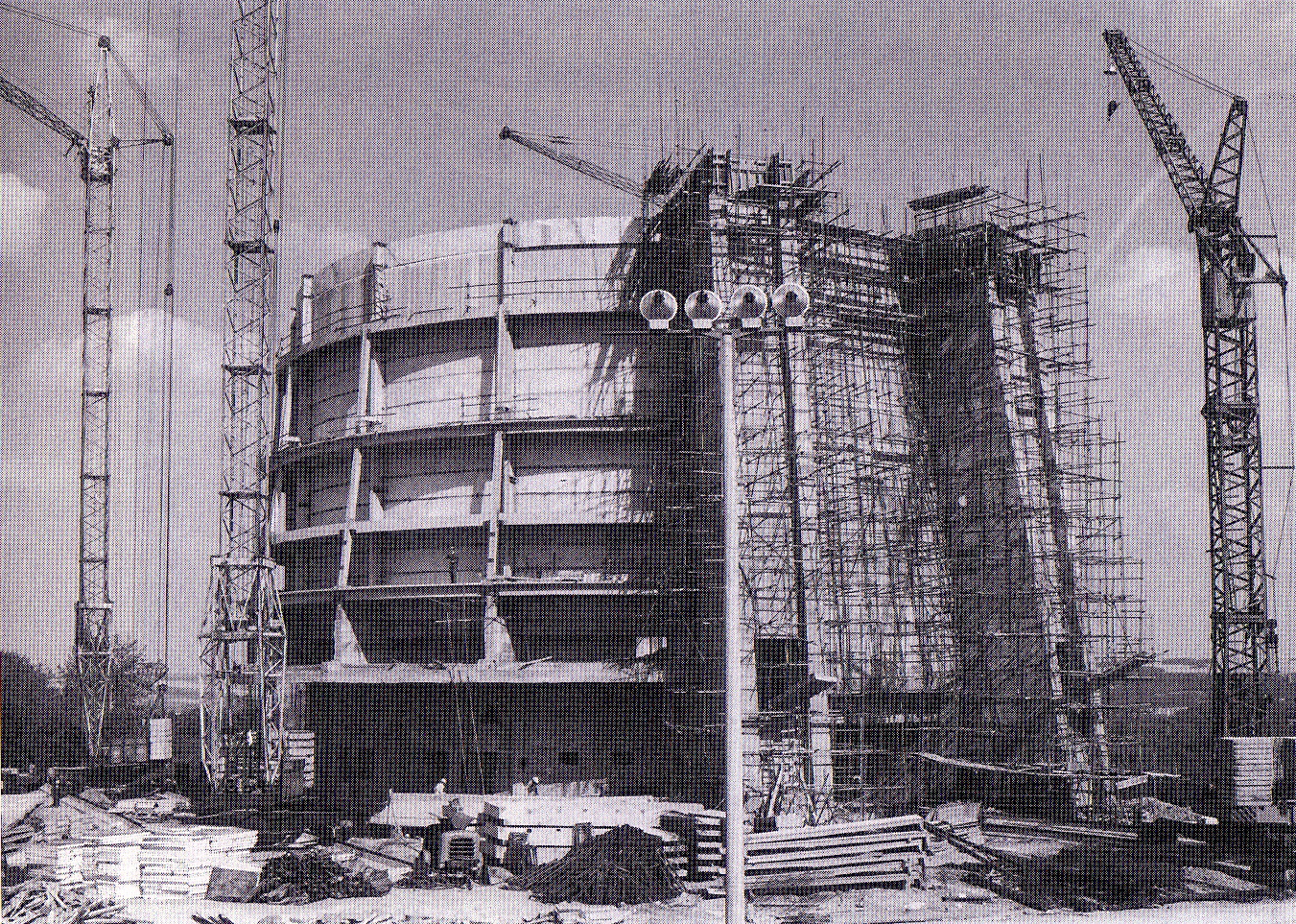
Pleven Panorama under construction, July 1977

Most of the historical landmarks in Pleven are related to the Russo-Turkish war, with around 200 monuments commemorating the bloodiest battles of the war. The Pleven Panorama was constructed in honor of the centennial of the surrender of Turkish forces to Russian and Romanian troops, ending the siege on Plevna. It was conceived and designed by N. Ovetchkin, an author from Moscow as a counterpart to the Borodin Panorama in Belgorod, Russia. The panorama is situated in Skobelev Park, named for the general who commanded the Russian forces and led them to victory over the Turks at Plevna, and the site upon which the deciding battle of the five-month siege on the city occurred.

Eleven Russian and two Bulgarian artists painted and constructed the panoramic painting which includes a 115×15-meter main canvas and 12-meter foreground. The goal of Ovetchkin and the artists who created the panorama was to create a feeling of empathy for the battle that was fought on the site as well as a feeling of authenticity of the events that occurred on 11 September 1877. The panorama opened to the public on 10 December 1977, 100 years to the day that Field Marshal Osman Pasha surrendered to Colonel Mihail Cerchez, ending the Pleven Epopee.

== Composition ==
The architectural unit is composed of four rooms: introductory, panoramic, diorama and finale. The six canvases of the introductory room discover the tragic destiny of the people, their dramatic fight and their compassion to the fellow Russian soldiers. The spectator is in the middle of the battlefield, surrounded by an attacking Russian regiment, smoking shells, a doctor and a nurse, the attack of the Turkish cavalry, burning fires in the city, and the Russian General Mikhail Skobelev conducting an attack against the Ottoman fortification.

== See also ==
- International Panorama Council
- Cyclorama
- Diorama
