= Romanian War of Independence =

Conflict fought during the 1877-78 Russo-Turkish war

- Part of the Russo-Turkish War of 1877–78
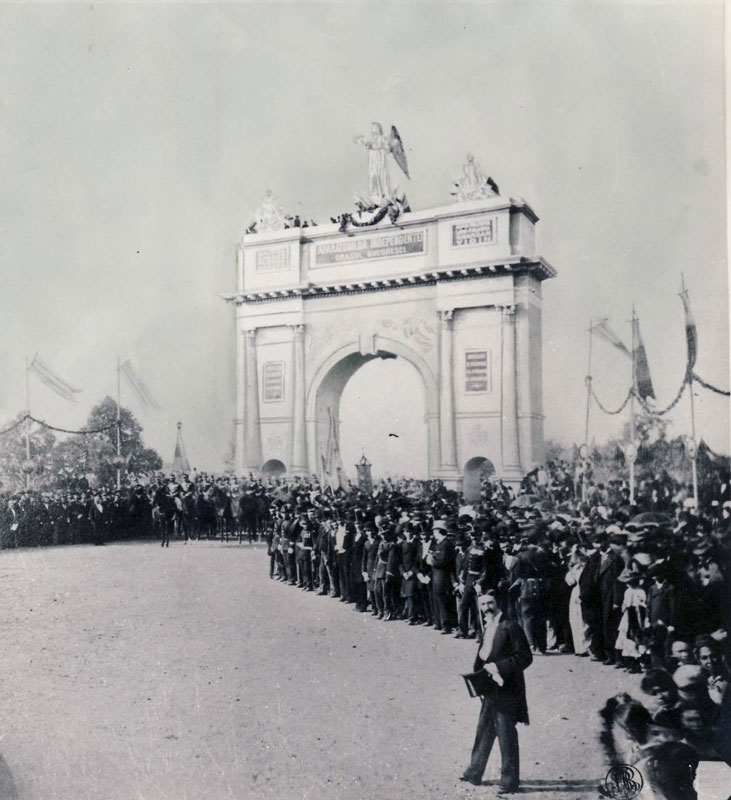
- Romanian troops returning to Bucharest after the war, 8 October 1878.
Date	24 April [O.S. 12 April] 1877 – 3 March 1878 (10 months, 1 week, 2 days)
Location	Balkans
Result	Romanian–Russian victory: Treaty of San Stefano; Treaty of Berlin
Territorial changes	Northern Dobruja passed from Ottoman Empire to Romania; Southern Bessarabia passed from Romania to Russian Empire

Belligerents
Romania (Russian Empire) Russia	Ottoman Empire

Commanders and leaders
(Romania) Carol I (Romania) Mihail Cerchez (Romania) Alexandru Cernat (Russian Empire) Grand Duke Nikolai (Russian Empire) Nikolai Stoletov	(Ottoman Empire) Ahmed Muhtar Pasha (Ottoman Empire) Gazi Osman Pasha

Strength
(Romania) Around 114,000 soldiers 190 cannons (Russian Empire) 280,000 troops (European front); 500 cannons	(Ottoman Empire) 106,000 troops 210 cannons

Casualties and losses
(Romania) 4,302 killed and missing 3,316 wounded 19,904 sick (Russian Empire) 15,567 killed 56,652 wounded 6,824 died from wounds 81,363 died from disease 1,713 died from other causes 3,500 missing	30,000 killed in battle, 50,000 died from wounds and diseases (during the entire Russo-Turkish War); 2 river monitors sunk

The Romanian War of Independence (Romanian: Războiul de Independență al României) is the name used in Romanian historiography to refer to the phase of the Russo-Turkish War (1877–78), in which Romania, fighting on the Russian side of the war, gained independence from the Ottoman Empire. On 16 April [O.S. 4 April] 1877, Romania and the Russian Empire signed a treaty at Bucharest under which Russian troops were allowed to pass through Romanian territory, with the condition that Russia respected the integrity of Romania. Consequently, the mobilization of the Romanian troops also began, and around 114,000 soldiers were massed in the south of the country to defend against an eventual attack of the Ottoman forces from south of the Danube. On 24 April [O.S. 12 April] 1877, Russia declared war on the Ottoman Empire and its troops entered Romania through the newly built Eiffel Bridge, on their way to the Ottoman Empire. Due to great losses, the Russian Empire asked Romania to intervene. On 24 July [O.S. 12 July] 1877, the first Romanian Army units crossed the Danube and joined forces with the Russian Army.

== Background ==
Romania had been a widely autonomous principality since 1862, when the personal union of Moldavia and Wallachia under Prince Alexandru Ioan Cuza was turned into a full union. While it was still technically under the suzerainty of the Sublime Porte, this was a legal fiction. Much like the states of the Holy Roman Empire after 1648, Romania de facto acted as an independent principality. While it conducted a common foreign policy with Constantinople, it had its own constitution, flag, and anthem. From 1868, it also had its own currency. Notably, when Romania adopted its first permanent constitution in 1866 under Cuza's successor, Carol I, it did not even consult the Porte.

== Romanian Proclamation of Independence and Conflict ==
After the declaration of war by Russia in 1877, Grand Duke Nikolai Nikolaevich announced his intention of entering Romanian territory. The Romanian parliament announced a special sitting of the chamber on April, 26 to address the issue and the possibility of joining the war and under what terms.

On 21 May [O.S. 9 May] 1877, in the Romanian parliament, Mihail Kogălniceanu read the act of independence of Romania as the will of the Romanian people. A day later, on 22 May [O.S. 10 May] 1877, the act was signed by Prince Carol I. For symbolic reasons, the date of May 10 was celebrated as Independence Day, until 1947, since it also marked the celebration of the day when the German Prince Carol first came to Bucharest (May 10, 1866). On May 11 a resolution was adopted by the chamber authorizing the Government to use every possible endeavour to obtain the recognition of Romanian independence at the end of the war. After the Declaration, the Romanian government immediately cancelled paying tribute to the Ottoman Empire (914,000 lei), and the sum was given instead to the Romanian War Ministry.

Prince Carol I accepted the Duke's proposal to become the Marshal of the Russian troops in addition to the command of his own Romanian army, thus being able to lead the combined armed forces in the conquest of Plevna. The Romanian Army was divided into the first Army Corps under Colonel Lupu and Second Army Corps under Colonel Radovici. With his army's success in the Grivitsa and Rahova, the Plevna citadel capitulated on 28 November 1877, and Turkish General Osman Pasha surrendered the city, along with his garrison and sword to the Romanian colonel Mihail Cerchez and Russian division commander Ivan Ganetsky. After the occupation of Plevna, the Romanian Army would return to the Danube and succeed in battles in Vidin and Smârdan.

On 19 January 1878, the Ottoman Empire requested an armistice, which was accepted by Russia and Romania. Romania won the war but at a cost of about 10,000 casualties. Additionally, another 19,084 soldiers fell sick during the campaign. Its independence from the Porte was finally recognized on 13 July 1878.

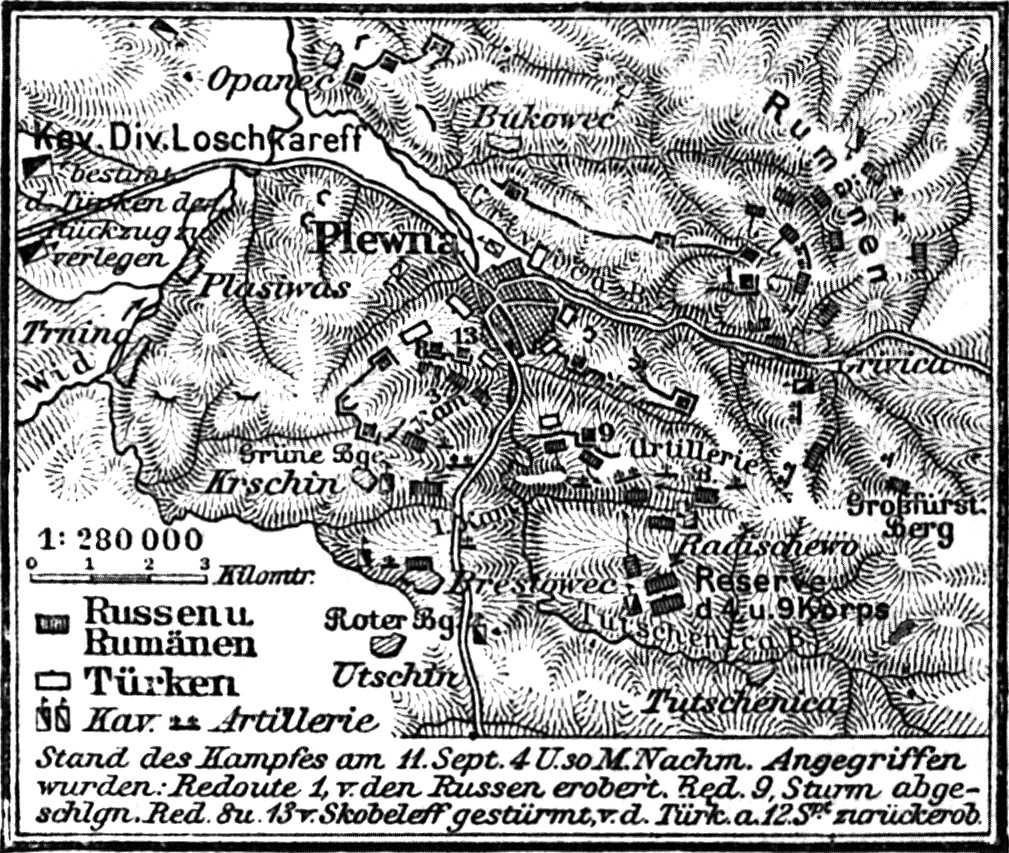
Map of the Siege of Plevna

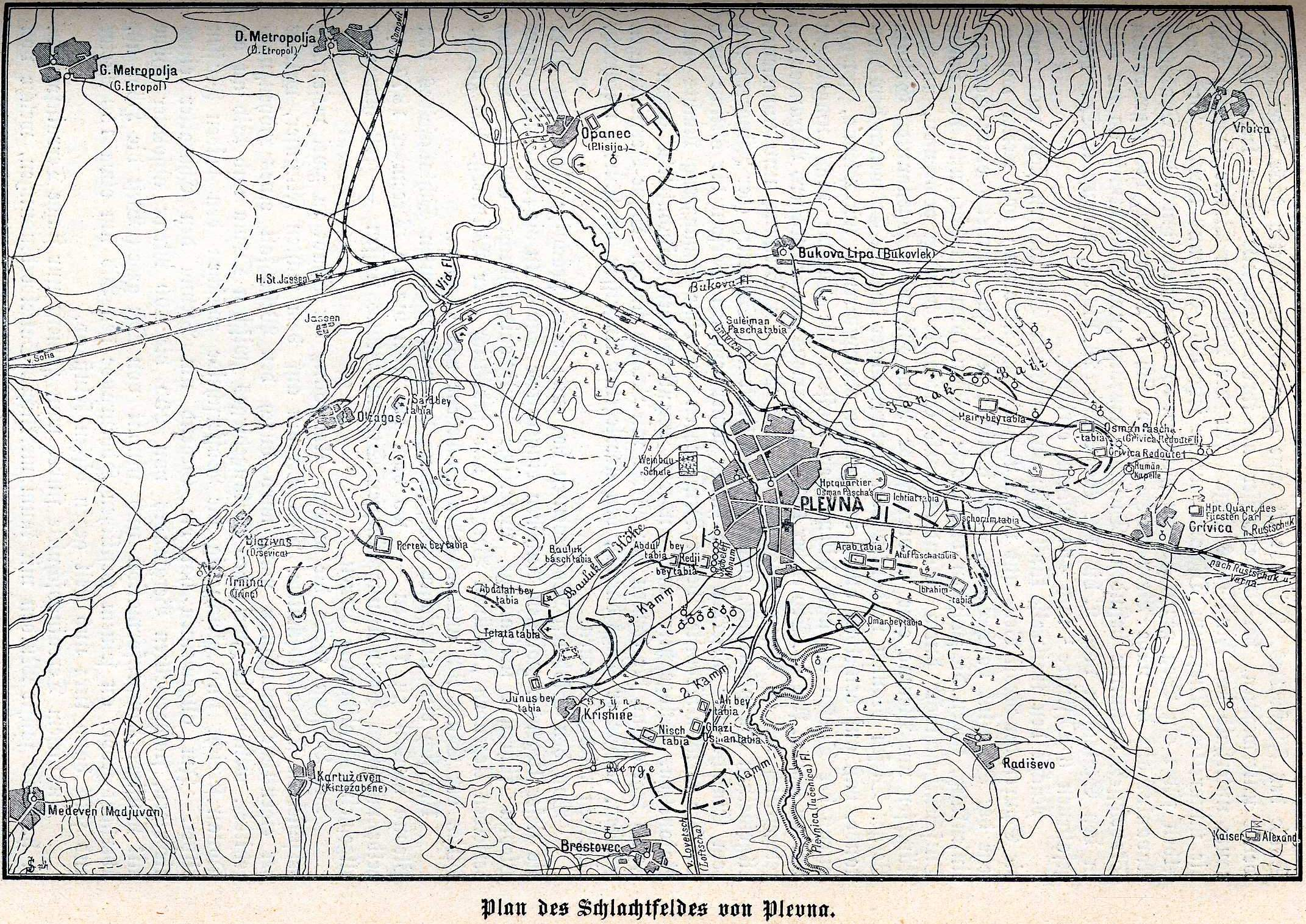
The battlefield of Plevna and Grivitsa

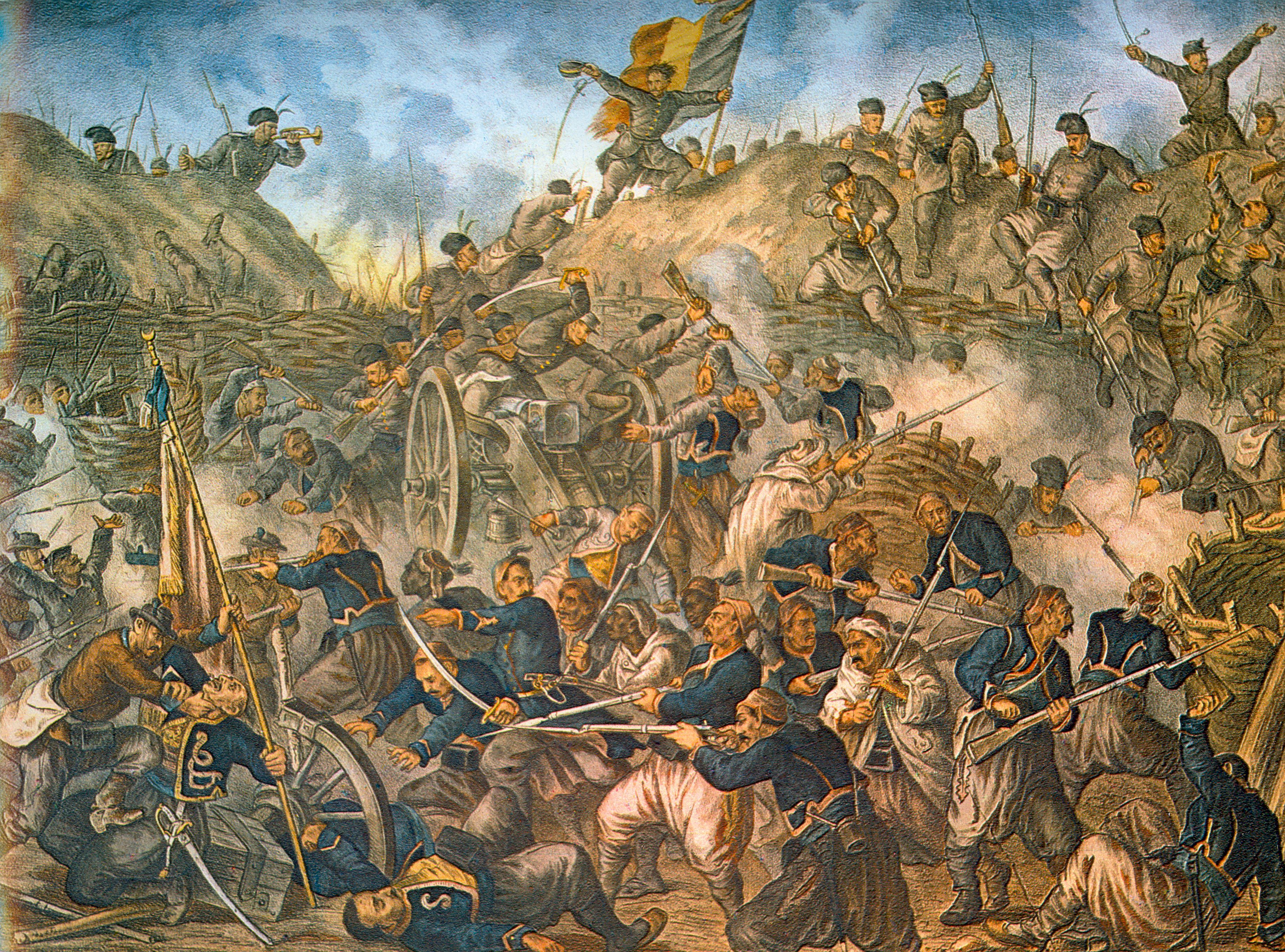
Romanian troops storming the Grivitsa Redoubt

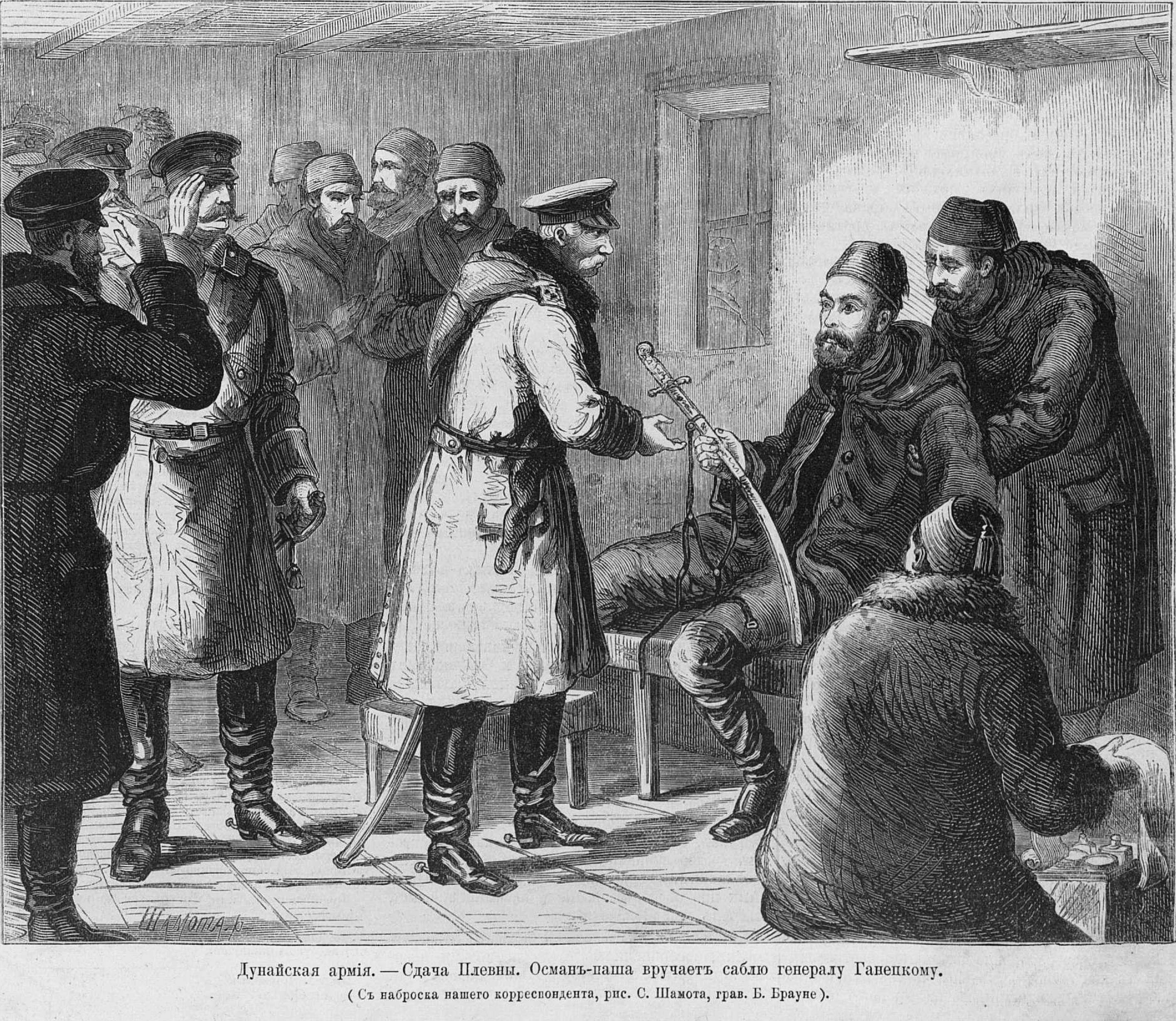
Osman Pasha surrendered his sword to Russian division commander Ivan Ganetsky, 1877

=== Naval operations ===
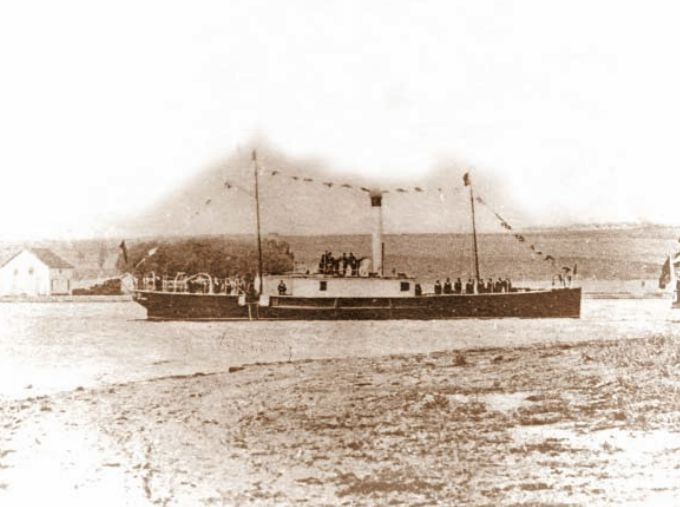
The gunboat România

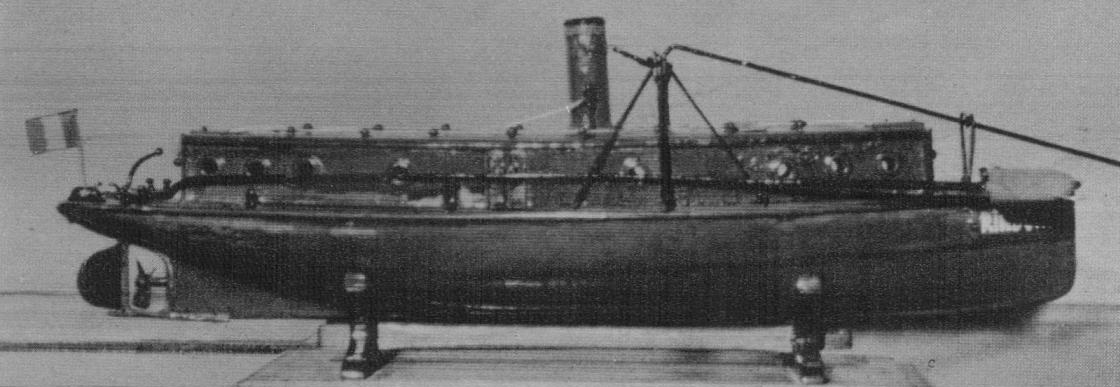
The spar torpedo boat Rândunica

The Romanian Navy consisted of three gunboats: Ştefan cel Mare, România and Fulgerul and one spar torpedo boat, Rândunica. The three gunboats displaced 352, 130 and 85 tons respectively. Ştefan cel Mare and România were each armed with four guns and Fulgerul with one gun. Despite its inferiority on paper, the Romanian Navy destroyed many Turkish river gunboats.

According to the Russian-Romanian treaty signed in April that year, the Romanian spar torpedo boat Rândunica served under joint Romanian-Russian command. She was also known as Tsarevich by the Russians. Her crew consisted of two Russian Lieutenants, Dubasov and Shestakov, and three Romanians: Major Murgescu (the official liaison officer with the Russian headquarters), an engine mechanic and a navigator. The attack of Rândunica took place during the night of 25–26 May 1877, near Măcin. As she was approaching the Ottoman monitor Seyfi, the latter fired three rounds at her without any effect. Before she could fire the fourth round, Rândunica's spar struck her between the midships and the stern. A powerful explosion followed, with debris from the Ottoman warship rising up to 40 meters in the air. The half-sunk monitor then re-opened fire, but was struck once again, with the same devastating effects. The crew of Seyfi subsequently fired their rifles at Rândunica, as the latter was retreating and their monitor was sinking. Following this action, Ottoman warships throughout the remainder of the war would always retreat upon sighting spar torpedo boats. The Russian Lieutenants Dubasov and Shestakov were decorated with the Order of St. George, while Major Murgescu was decorated with the Order of Saint Vladimir as well as the Order of the Star of Romania. Rândunica was returned to full Romanian control in 1878, after the Russian ground forces had finished crossing the Danube. The Ottoman monitor Seyfi was a 400-ton ironclad warship, with a maximum armor thickness of 76 mm and armed with two 120 mm guns.

Another Ottoman monitor, the Podgoriçe, was shelled and sunk by Romanian coastal artillery on 7 November 1877.

== Aftermath ==
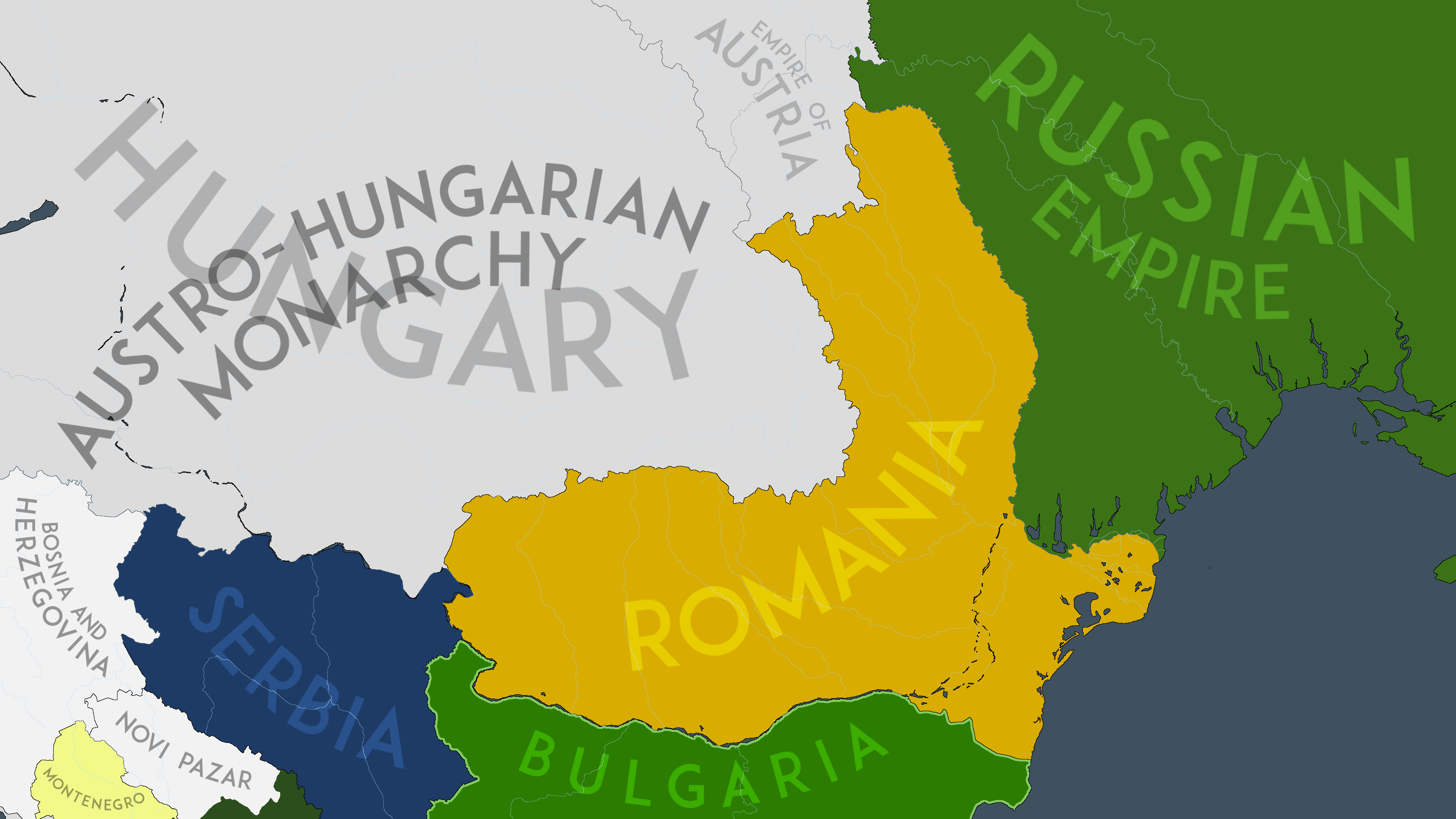
Romania in 1878, after the Treaty of Berlin and the international recognition of Romania's independence.

The peace treaty between Russia and the Ottoman Empire was signed at San Stefano, on 3 March 1878. It created a Bulgarian principality and recognized the independence of Serbia, Montenegro, and Romania.

The Convention between Russia and Romania, which established the transit of Russian troops through the country, is one by which Russia obliged itself "to maintain and have the political rights of Romanian state observed, such as they result from the internal laws and the existent tratatives and also to defend the present integrity of Romania". The Romanians believe that "defend" in a diplomatic act means recognition of the status-quo set by Congress of Paris of 1856, whereby three counties in Southern Bessarabia (part of Budjak, a region conquered by Turks around the late 15th century and ruled until the late 19th century when it was conquered by Russians) were taken from the Russian Empire, defeated in the Crimean War, and given back to the Romanians in Principality of Moldavia. The Russian Empire wanted to conquer as much as possible from the sick man of Europe, the Black Sea region (control of Danube) all the way to Constantinopole (Dardanelles/Bosphorus) and the Mediterranean Sea.

The treaty was not recognised by the Central Powers and the 1878 peace conference in Berlin decided that Russia would give Romania its independence, the territories of Northern Dobruja, the Danube Delta and access to the Black Sea including the ancient port of Tomis, as well as the tiny Snake Island (Insula Şerpilor), but Russia would nevertheless occupy as a so-called "compensation" the old Romanian counties of Southern Bessarabia (Cahul, Bolgrad and Ismail), which by the Treaty of Paris of 1856 (after the Crimean War) were included in Moldavia. Prince Carol was most unhappy by this unfavorable turn of negotiations; he was finally persuaded by Bismarck (in now-published original letters exchanged at that time) to accept this compromise with Russia in view of the great economical potential of Romania's direct access to the Black Sea and its ancient ports at the expense of Bulgaria.

== See also ==
- Kingdom of Romania
- Great Eastern Crisis
- Crossing of the Danube Cross
