= Mihail Cerchez =

Romanian general

Mihail Cerchez Cristodulo
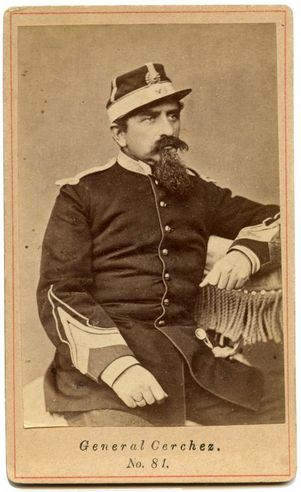
- Born: 8 June 1839; Bârlad, Moldavia
- Died: 12 July 1885 (aged 46); Iași, Kingdom of Romania
- Burial place: Eternitatea Cemetery, Iași
- Military career
- Allegiance: Romania
- Branch: Romanian Armed Forces
- Service years: 1855–1882
- Known for: On 28 November 1877 at Pleven Castle, Osman Pasha surrendered his sword to him when the Ottomans capitulated
- Conflicts: Romanian War of Independence; Siege of Plevna; Battle of Smârdan; Battle of Vidin
- Memorials: Bust at the Romanian Soldier Mausoleum in Grivitsa

Mihail Cerchez Cristodulo (8 June 1839 – 12 July 1885) was a Romanian general who fought at the Siege of Plevna and the battles of Smârdan and Vidin during the Romanian War of Independence.

== Biography ==
Descended from an old Armenian family, he was born in Bârlad and studied at the Academia Mihăileană in Iași. He volunteered into the army as a cadet in 1855, and rose rapidly through the ranks: sergeant in 1856, second lieutenant in 1857, lieutenant in 1858, captain in 1860, and major in 1863. Promoted to lieutenant colonel in 1867 and colonel in 1870, Cerchez served in the Romanian Army during the Romanian War of Independence (1877–1878). At the start of the war, he was commander of the 2nd and 1st Infantry Divisions of the Danube defense, which protected the rear of the armed forces fighting on the front, in Bulgaria. Later, as head of the Reserve Division, he was instrumental in surrounding the Ottomans at the Siege of Plevna and the battles of Smârdan and Vidin. On 6 September 1877, Cerchez took charge of the Operative Army. On November 28, 1877, when Osman Pasha tried to break the siege, the Romanian troops under his command thwarted the attempt. Overwhelmed, stuck in the middle of enemy troops, the Turkish general had to admit defeat. Cerchez gained fame for being the officer to whom Osman Pasha surrendered and gave his sword that day at Plevna, saying, "Together with my army I surrender myself into the hands of the young and brave Romanian Army."

Cerchez retired from active service in 1882 and died in Iași three years later. He is buried in the city's Eternitatea Cemetery, next to World War II General Radu Korne.

== Legacy ==
The 85th Logistics Support Battalion for the 8th Mixed Artillery Brigade was named General Mihail Cerchez. Streets in Craiova and in Sector 4 of Bucharest also bear his name.

As a gratitude for his efforts toward the independence of Bulgaria, the Bulgarian people built a bust of him in the Romanian Soldier Mausoleum at Grivitsa.
