= 8th Tactical Operational Missile Brigade =

- Brigada 8 Rachete Operativ Tactice "Alexandru Ioan Cuza"
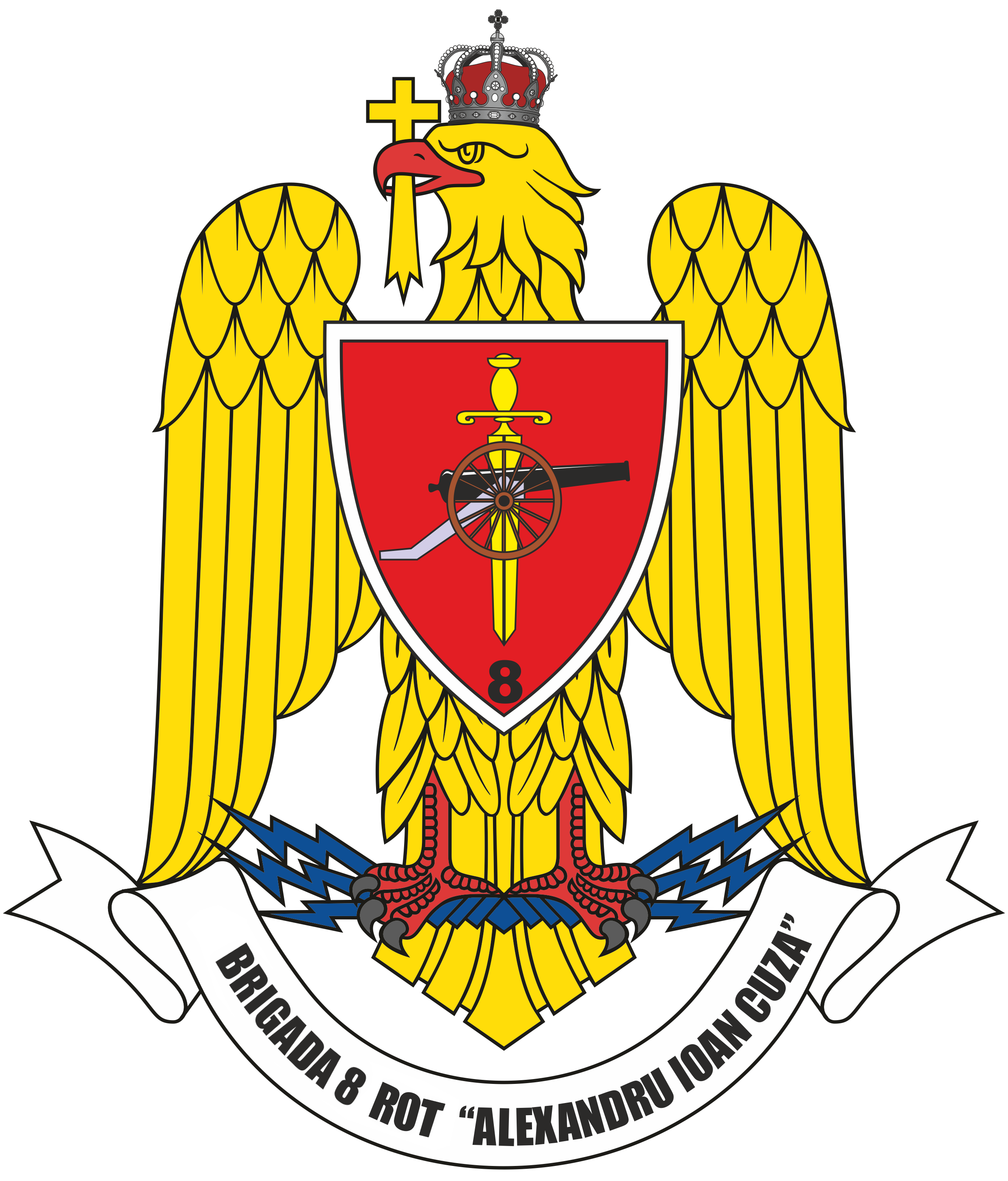
- Official insignia of the 8th ROT Brigade
- Active: 1 July 1916 – present
- Country: Romania
- Branch: Romanian Land Forces
- Type: Artillery
- Size: 5 battalions + other supporting companies
- Part of: Romanian Land Forces
- Garrison/HQ: Focșani
- Anniversaries: 1 July
- Engagements: World War I: Romanian campaign; World War II: Siege of Odessa; Battle of Stalingrad; Second Jassy–Kishinev offensive; Battle of Budapest; War in Afghanistan Iraq War

Commanders
- Current commander: Colonel Costel-Sorin Balan
- Command Sergeant Major: Plutonier adjutant Marius Dudău

The 8th Tactical Operational Missile Brigade (Brigada 8 Rachete Operativ Tactice "Alexandru Ioan Cuza"), former 8th LAROM Brigade, is a Multiple Rocket Launcher brigade of the Romanian Land Forces. The brigade was named after the Romanian Domnitor Alexandru Ioan Cuza in 2006. It is the successor of three units: the 2nd Heavy Artillery Brigade, and the 1st and 4th Heavy Artillery Regiments, which were merged into the 8th Heavy Artillery Brigade in 1949.

The Brigade is subordinated to the General Staff of the Romanian Land Forces and has its headquarters in Focșani. Soldiers of the Brigade were deployed to various operation theatres in Bosnia and Herzegovina, Afghanistan, and Iraq. Since October 2004, the unit no longer uses conscripts.

== History ==
=== 2nd Heavy Artillery Brigade ===
On 1 July 1916, the 2nd Heavy Artillery Brigade was formed within the Bucharest Garrison, with the 3rd and 4th Heavy Artillery Regiments under its command. The Brigade was subordinated to the Bucharest Fortress Command. The Brigade, participated in the Romanian 1916 campaign during the First World War, with the 3rd Regiment taking part in the Battle of Turtucaia and in the Battle of Bucharest, and later in the 1917 campaign.

The Brigade was reestablished in 1948 as the Mixed Artillery Brigade based in Slobozia. A year later, it was moved to Focșani.

=== 1st and 4th Heavy Artillery Regiments ===
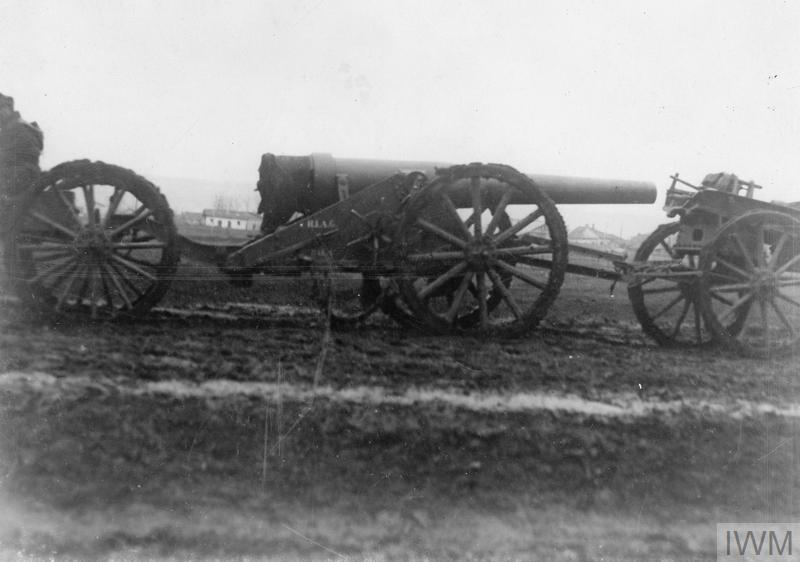
150 mm Krupp Model 1891 gun of Regimentul 1 Artilerie Grea (R.1 A.G.) at Bârlad in 1916

The 1st Siege Artillery Regiment (Regimentul 1 Artilerie Asediu) was formed on 1 March 1915, with its garrison at the Jilava Fort. Its name was changed to the 1st Heavy Artillery Regiment (Regimentul 1 Artilerie Grea) in 1916. It participated in both the 1916 and 1917 campaigns.

The 4th Heavy Artillery Regiment participated in the Battle of Transylvania and in the battles on the Prahova Valley and Buzău. In 1928, the Regiment changed its name to the 5th Heavy Artillery Regiment, with its garrison being moved to Focșani.

During World War II, both the 1st and 5th Regiments were part of the Romanian forces that fought at the Siege of Odessa in 1941; the 5th Regiment was the first artillery regiment to hit Odesa. The 1st Regiment supported the actions of Third Army and also participated in the Battle of Stalingrad (starting with October 1942) with the 5th Heavy Artillery Regiment. At Stalingrad, the entire 5th Regiment was encircled and taken prisoner as the Germans took their necessary fuel for the vehicles towing the guns. The Regiment was reformed by 1 May 1943 with the 45th and 54th Independent Heavy Artillery Divizions.

During the Second Jassy–Kishinev offensive in 1944, the 1st Heavy Artillery Regiment supported General Mieth's Army Corps. In 1945, it further took part in the Siege of Budapest.

=== 8th Brigade ===
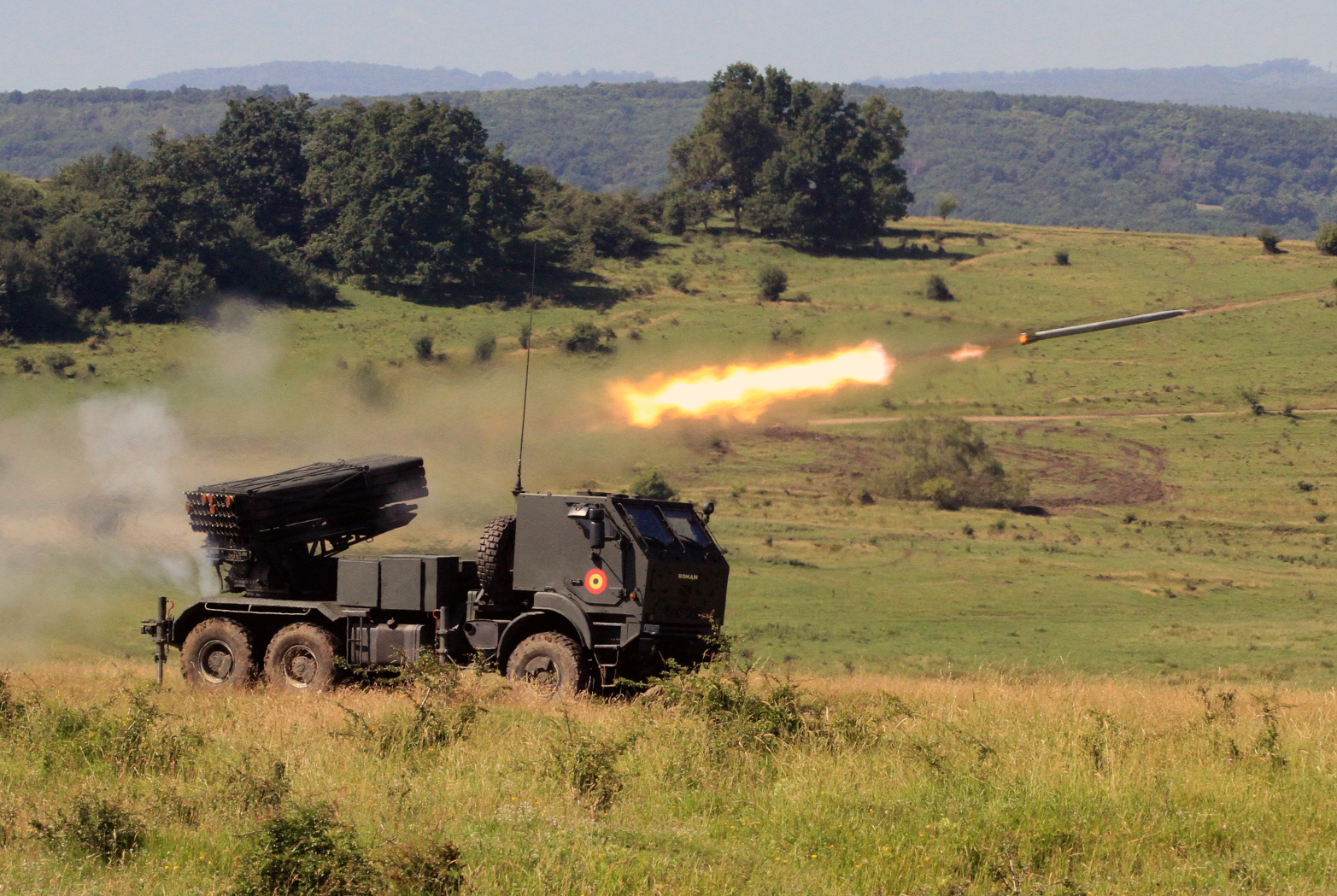
LAROM MRLS at Cincu

After the war, the 1st Regiment was moved to Pitești, then to Focșani in 1948. Both regiments merged with the former 2nd Heavy Artillery Brigade into the 8th Heavy Artillery Brigade in 1949. During the 1950s, the Brigade changed its name several times, settling on the 8th Artillery Gun Brigade in 1959 and keeping the name until 1995 when it was changed to the 8th Artillery Brigade.

In 2001, the Brigade became the 8th Mixed Artillery Brigade, then on 1 November 2010, it was renamed to the 8th LAROM Brigade following the modernization plan of the Romanian Army. Soldiers of the brigade participated in multiple international missions in Afghanistan, Iraq, and Kosovo in advisory and support roles.

With the reception of the first HIMARS launchers in 2021, the brigade changed its name from LAROM to Tactical Operational Missile (Rachete Operativ Tactice - ROT). In 2025, a team of soldiers from the 8th ROT Brigade took part in the Loyal Leda 2025 exercise at the Joint Force Training Centre in Bydgoszcz, Poland for practicing military actions in a NATO Article 5 scenario.

In 2026, the 8th Tactical Missile Brigade became a fully operational NATO-certified unit following a process that spanned from January to November.

== Organization ==
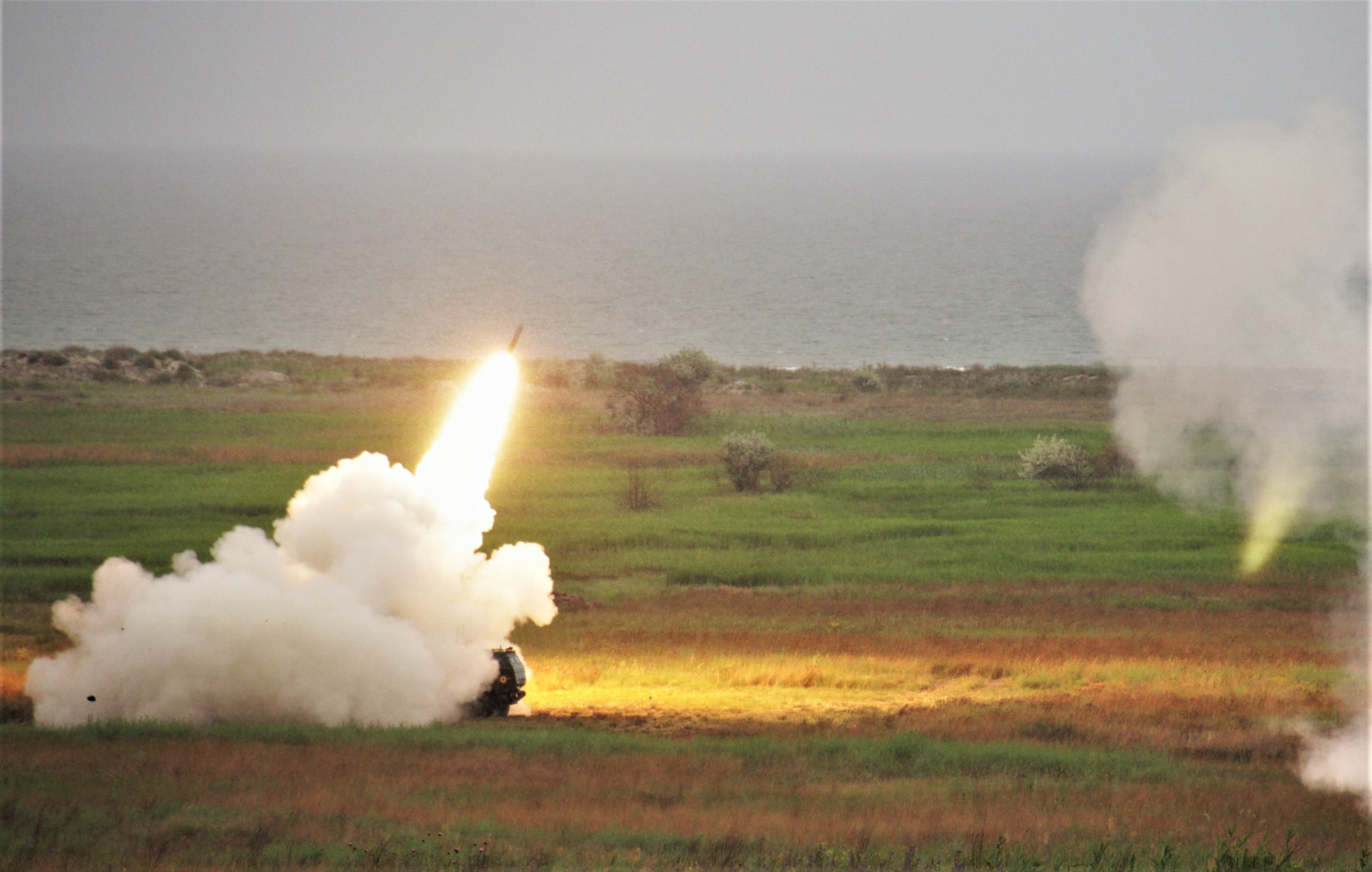
First shootings with the HIMARS system at Capu Midia

- 8th Tactical Operational Missile Brigade "Alexandru Ioan Cuza", in Focșani
  - 81st Tactical Operational Missile Battalion "Maior Gheorghe Șonțu", in Focșani
  - 83rd Tactical Operational Missile Battalion "Bogdan I", in Bârlad
  - 96th Tactical Operational Missile Battalion "Mircea Voievod", in Ploiești
  - 84th Support Battalion "Mărăști", in Focșani
  - 85th Logistic Support Battalion "General Mihail Cerchez", in Bârlad

== Equipment ==
- M142 HIMARS multiple rocket launchers
- AN/TPQ-53 Quick Reaction Capability Radar
- Other supporting/transport vehicles

== Decorations ==
The 8th Brigade has received the following decorations:

- National Order of Merit, Peacetime (Knight – 2016; Officer – 2018)
- Order of Military Virtue, Peacetime (Knight – 2022)
