= Olga Skobeleva =

Russian philanthropist and hospital organizer

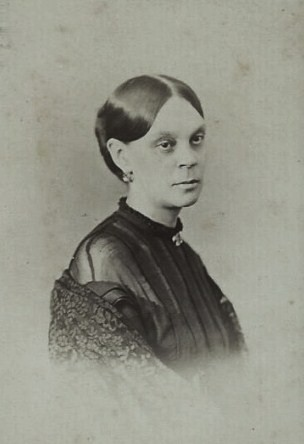
Olga Skobeleva in 1867

Olga Nikolayevna Skobeleva (née Poltavtseva; Russian: О́льга Никола́евна Ско́белева, урождённая Полта́вцева; 11 (23) March 1823 — 6 (18) July 1880) was a Russian philanthropist and hospital organizer. Olga and her family were strongly tied to the Imperial Russian Army; her husband was Russian general Dmitry Ivanovich Skobelev, while Olga was the mother of Russian general Mikhail Dmitrievich Skobelev and the head of the Bulgarian Red Cross. She was killed in Plovdiv, Bulgaria, when her carriage was ambushed by bandits in 1880. A monument was later built on the site of her murder.
