= Siege of Plevna =

1877 battle of the Russo-Turkish War

Siege of Pleven
- Part of the Russo-Turkish War (1877–1878)
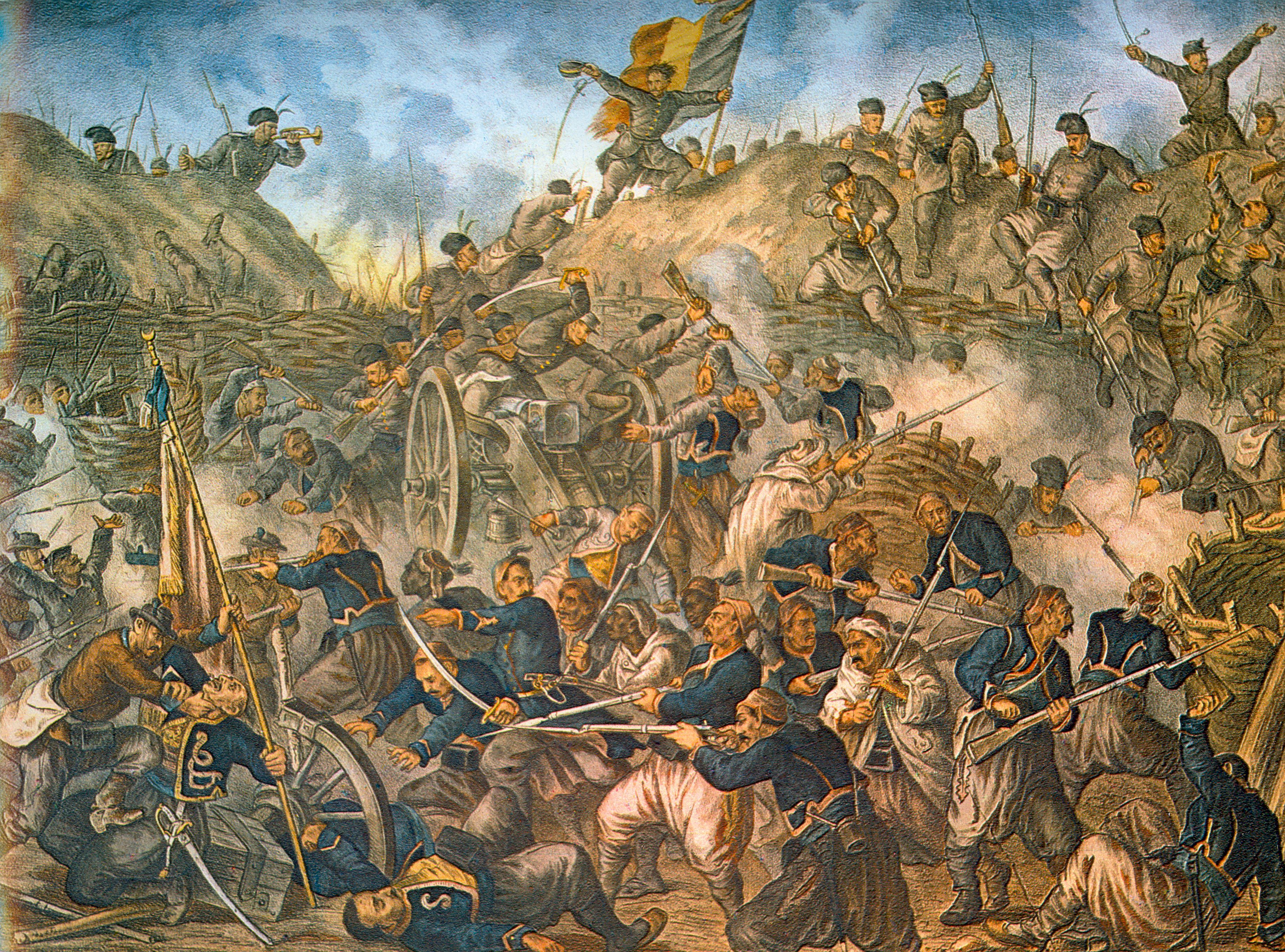
- The capture of the Grivitsa redoubt, by Henryk Dembitzky (1881)
Date	20 July – 10 December 1877 (4 months, 20 days) Full dates: 20 Jul. – 1st Rus. assault; 30 Jul. – 2nd Rus. assault; 30 Aug. – Turkish sortie; 11–12 Sep. – Great Assault; 9–10 Dec. – Breakout attempt
Location	Plevnа, Ottoman Empire (now Pleven, Bulgaria) 43°25′N 24°37′E
Result	Russian coalition victory Full results: Ottoman victory – 1st Rus. assault; Ottoman victory – 2nd Rus. assault; Russian coalition victory – Turkish sortie; Russian coalition victory – Battle of Lovcha; Ottoman victory – Great Assault; Russian coalition victory – Battle of Gorni Dubnik; Russian coalition victory – Breakout attempt; Russian offensive into Balkans delayed, preventing the fall of Constantinople

Belligerents
Russian Empire; Kingdom of Romania; Bulgarian Volunteers	Ottoman Empire

Commanders and leaders
(Russian Empire) Tsar Alexander II (Russian Empire) Yuri Schilder-Schuldner (1st Rus. assault) (Russian Empire) Nikolay Kridener (2nd Rus. assault) (Russian Empire) Pavel Zotov (Great Assault) (Note: Zotov was the de facto leader of the Great Assault.) (Russian Empire) Grand Duke Nicholas (Great Assault) (Note: Nicholas was the commander-in-chief of the Russian army.) (Russian Empire) Mikhail Skobelev (Great Assault) (Russian Empire) Eduard Totleben (Breakout attempt) (Russian Empire) Iosif Gurko (Breakout attempt) (Kingdom of Romania) King Carol I of Romania (Great Assault) (Note: Carol was the de jure leader of the Great Assault.) (Kingdom of Romania) Mihail Cerchez	Osman Nuri Pasha (surrendered); Edhem Pasha (surrendered); Sefë Kosharja; Abdullah Pasha

Strength
130,000: 6,500 – 1st Rus. assault; 30,000 – 2nd Rus. assault; 95,000 – Great Assault	67,000: 5,000 – 1st Rus. assault; 20,000 – 2nd Rus. assault; 30,000 – Great Assault

Casualties and losses
50,000 killed, wounded and missing: 3,000 – 1st Rus. assault; 7,305 killed, wounded or missing – 2nd Rus. assault; 20,600 killed, wounded or captured – Great Assault; 2,000 – Breakout attempt	25,000 killed or wounded 43,340 surrendered (including non-combatants); Total: 68,340: 2,000 – 1st Rus. assault; 2,000 killed or wounded – 2nd Rus. assault; 5,000 – Great Assault; 5,000 – Breakout attempt

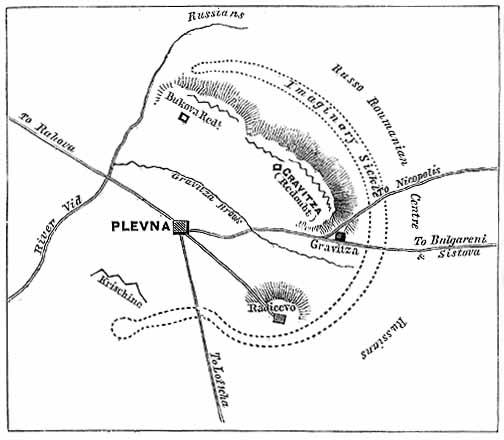
Map

The siege of Plevna or Pleven, was a major battle of the Russo-Turkish War of 1877–1878, fought by the joint army of the Russian Empire and the Kingdom of Romania against the Ottoman Empire. After the Russian army crossed the Danube at Svishtov, it began advancing towards the centre of modern Bulgaria, with the aim of crossing the Balkan Mountains to Constantinople, avoiding the fortified Turkish fortresses on the Black Sea coast. The Ottoman army led by Osman Pasha, returning from Serbia after a conflict with that country, was massed in the fortified city of Pleven, a city surrounded by numerous redoubts, located at an important road intersection.

After two unsuccessful assaults, in which he lost valuable troops, the commander of the Russian troops on the Balkan front, Grand Duke Nicholas of Russia insisted by telegram on the help of his Romanian ally King Carol I. King Carol I crossed the Danube with the Romanian Army and was placed in command of the Russian-Romanian troops. He decided not to make any more assaults, but to besiege the city, cutting off the food and ammunition supply routes.

At the beginning of the siege, the Russian-Romanian army managed to conquer several redoubts around Pleven, keeping in the long run only the Grivitsa redoubt. The siege, which began in July 1877, did not end until December of the same year, when Osman Pasha was wounded in a failed breakout attempt. Finally, Osman Pasha received the delegation led by General Mihail Cerchez and accepted the conditions of capitulation offered by him.

The Russian–Romanian victory on 10 December 1877 was decisive for the outcome of the war and the Liberation of Bulgaria. Following the battle, the Russian armies were able to advance and forcefully attack the Shipka Pass, succeeding in defeating the Ottoman defense and opening their way to Constantinople.

== Background ==
In July 1877, the Russian Army, under the command of Grand Duke Nicholas, moved toward the Danube River virtually unopposed, as the Ottomans had no sizable force in the area. The Ottoman high command sent an army under the command of Osman Nuri Pasha to reinforce Nikopol, but the city fell to the Russian vanguard in the Battle of Nikopol (16 July 1877) before Osman reached it. He settled on Plevna, a town among vineyards in a deep rocky valley some twenty miles to the south of Nikopol, as a defensive position. The Ottomans quickly created a strong fortress, raising earthworks with redoubts, digging trenches, and quarrying out gun emplacements. From Plevna Osman's army controlled the main strategic routes to the Balkan Mountains. As the Turks hurried to complete their defenses, Russian forces began to arrive.

Strength of forces throughout the siege
Date	Ottoman	Russian and Romanian
20 July (first battle)	11,000	25,000 infantry 3,000 cavalry 108 guns
30 July (second battle)	19–22,000 infantry 700 cavalry 58 guns 22,000 total	35,000 170 guns
3 September (assault on Lovech)		27,000 98 guns
11 September (third battle)		84,000 424 guns
Mid-November (the investment)		120,000 522 guns

== Siege ==
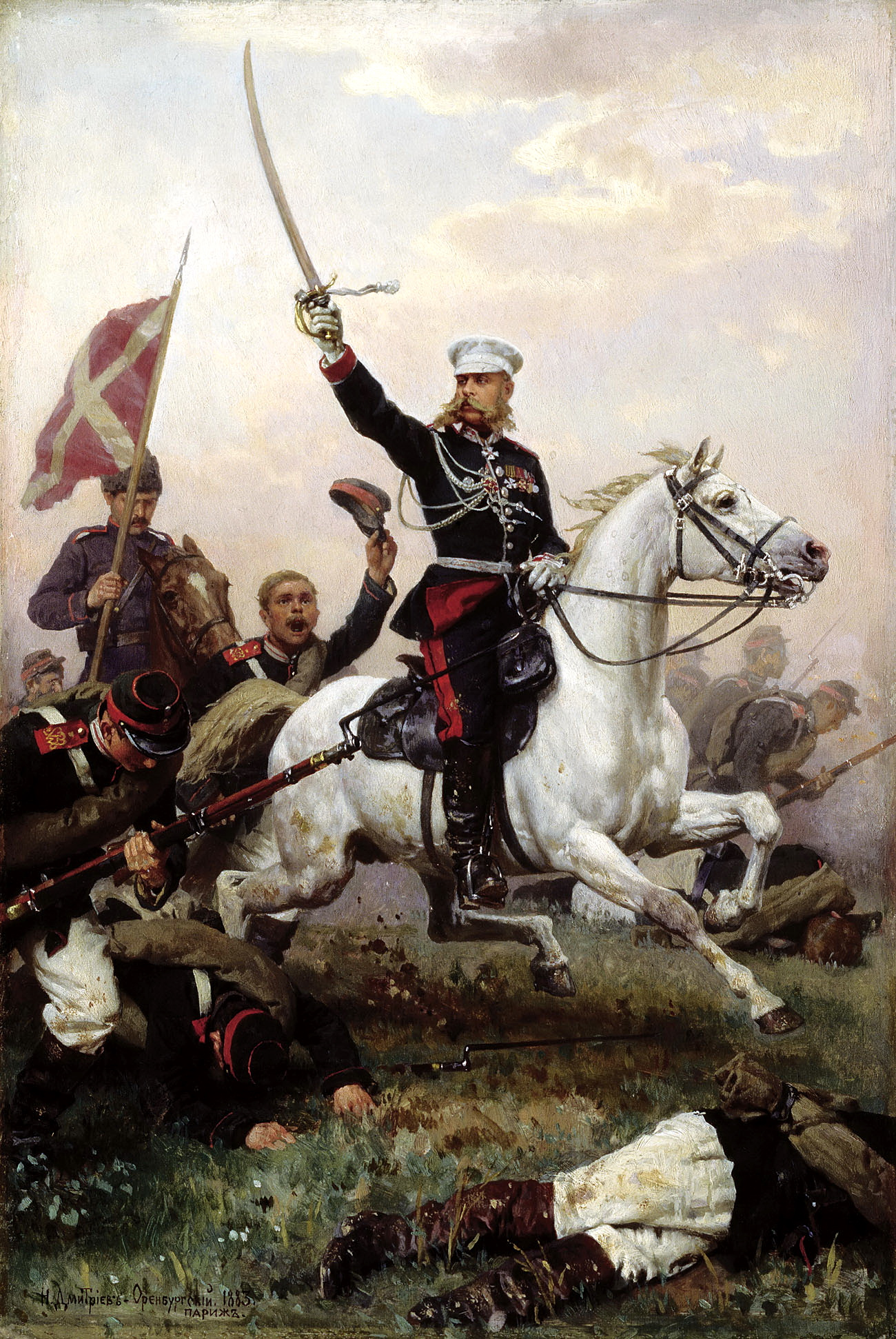
General Mikhail Skobelev on horseback, by Nikolai Dmitriev-Orenburgsky

=== First battle ===
General Yuri Schilder-Schuldner, commanding the Russian 5th Division, IX Corps, received orders to occupy Plevna. Schilder-Schuldner arrived outside the town on 19 July and began bombarding the Ottoman defenses. The next day his troops attacked and succeeded in driving Ottoman forces from some of the outer defenses; however, Osman Pasha brought up reinforcements and launched a series of counterattacks, which drove the Russians from the captured trenches, inflicting 3,000 casualties at a cost of 2,000 of his own men.

=== Second battle ===
Osman Pasha strengthened his defences and built more redoubts, his force growing to 22,000 men and 58 guns, while the Russians obtained reinforcements from the army of Prince Carol of Romania (later king Carol I of Romania), who received the command of the joint besieging force. General Nikolai Kridener also arrived with the Russian IX Corps. The overall number of Russian troops increased to 35,000 and 176 guns. On 31 July Russian headquarters ordered Kridener to assault the town, attacking from three sides, with every expectation of a Russo-Romanian triumph. General Alexey Schakhovskoy's cavalry attacked the eastern redoubts, while an infantry division under General Mikhail Skobelev assailed the Grivitsa redoubt to the north. Schakhovskoy managed to take two redoubts, but by the end of the day the Ottoman forces succeeded in repulsing all the attacks and retaking lost ground. Russian losses amounted to 7,300, and the Ottomans' to more than 2,000.

=== Third battle ===
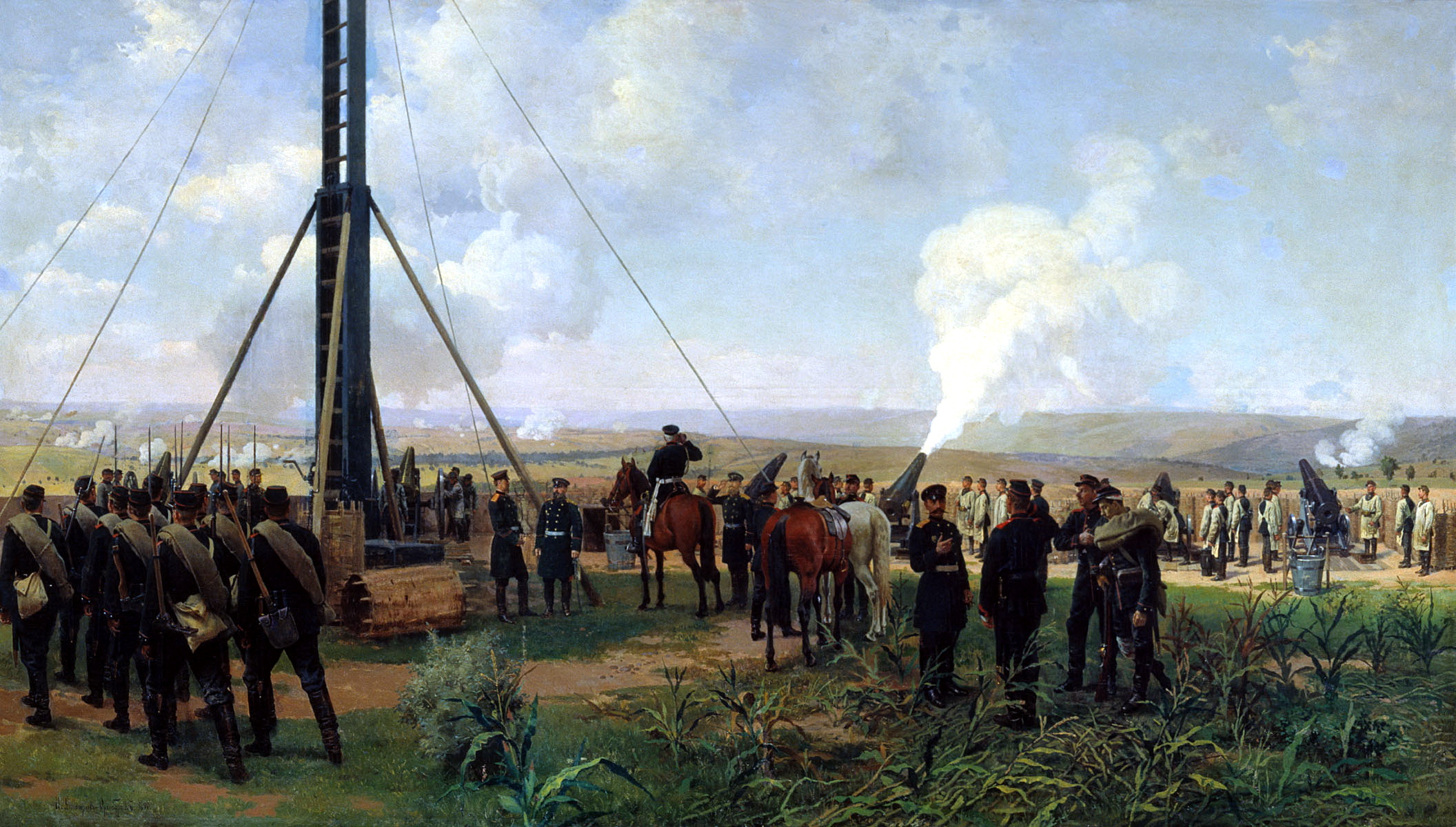
The artillery battle at Pleven. The battery of siege guns on the Grand Duke Mount, by Nikolai Dmitriev-Orenburgsky

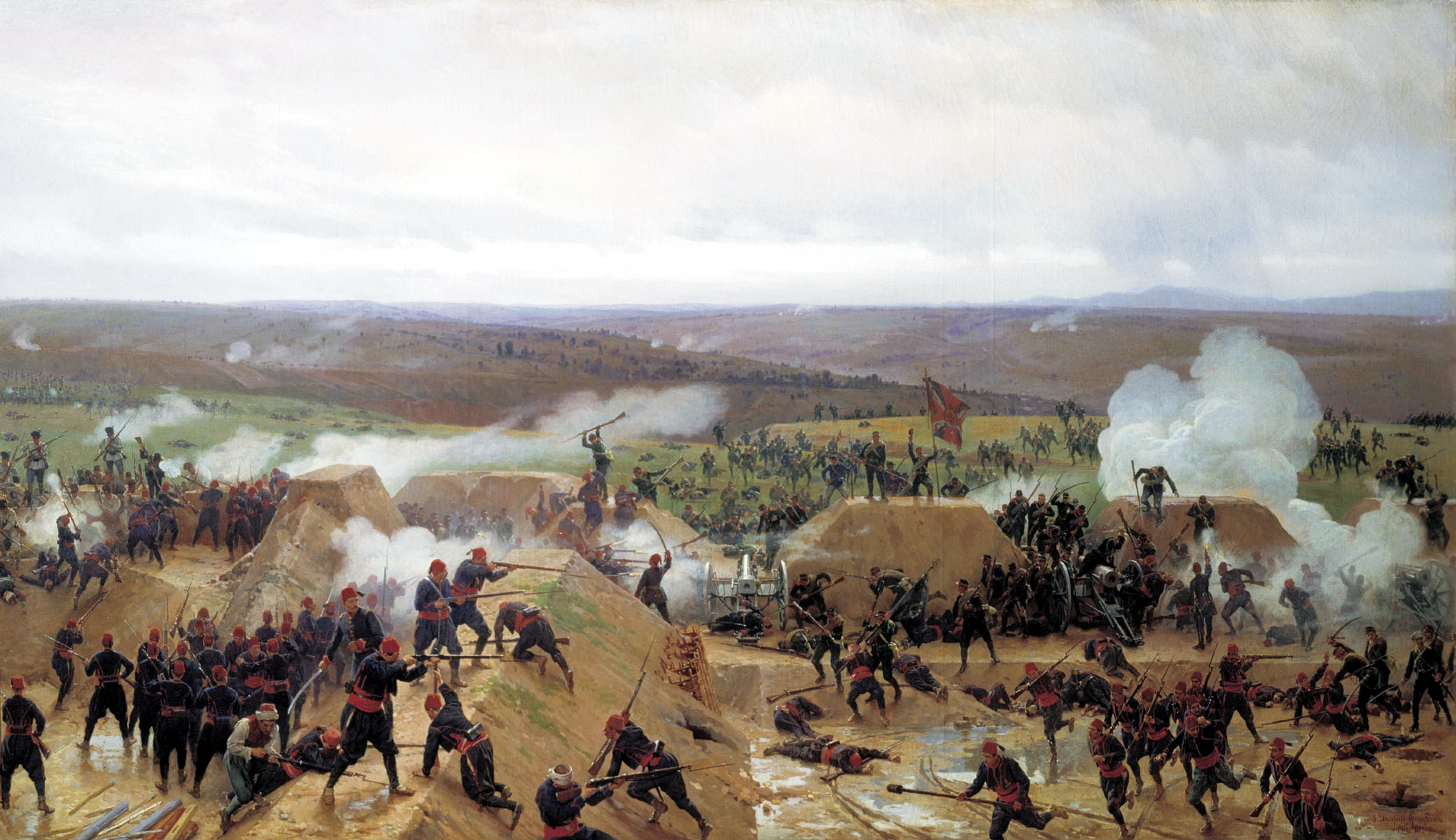
The Capture of the Grivitsa redoubt at Pleven, by Nikolai Dmitriev-Orenburgsky

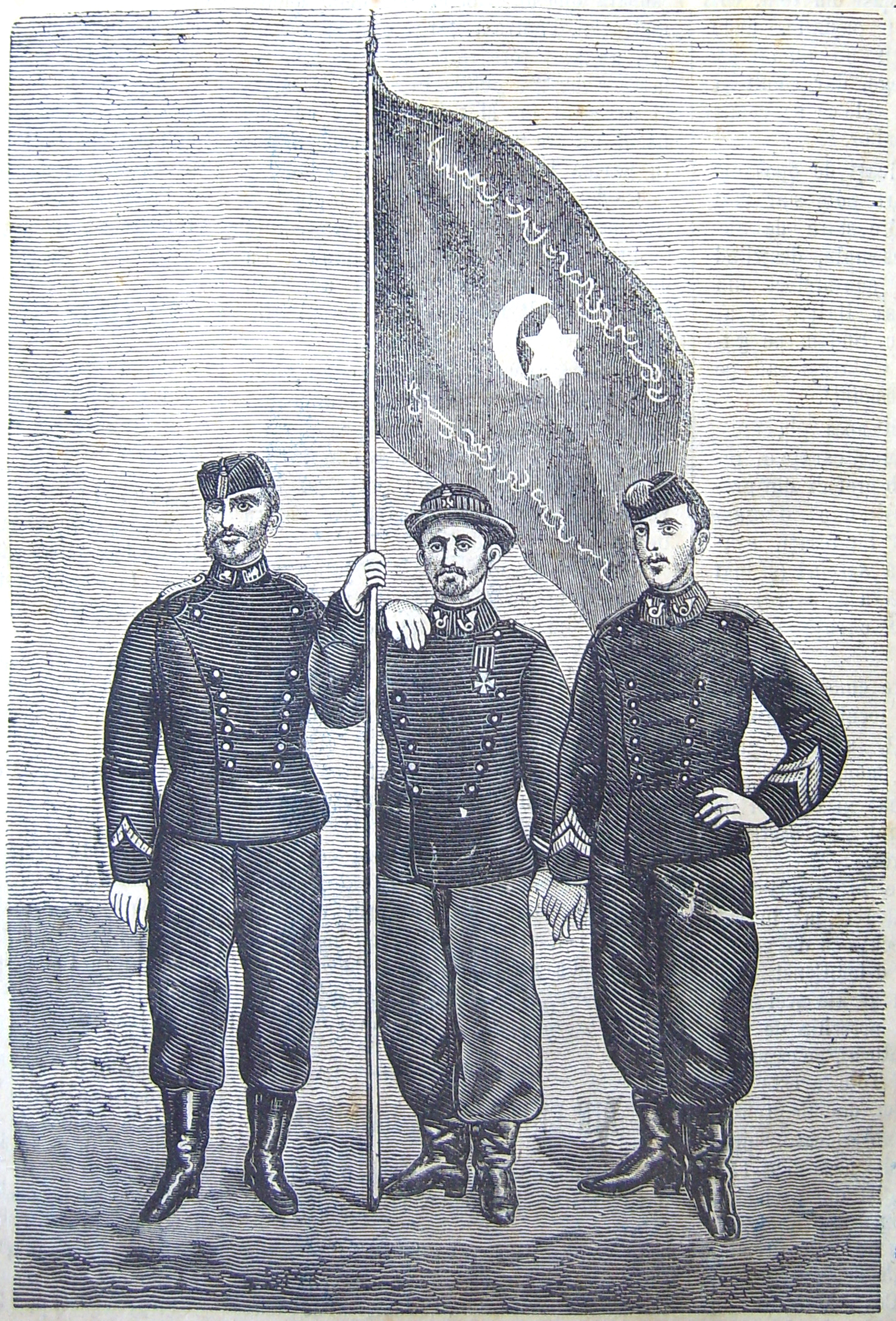
Three Romanian soldiers holding a captured Ottoman flag. from on cover of the Resboiu war newspaper.

The third battle of Plevna is also called the "Great Assault". After repulsing the Russian attacks, Osman failed to press his advantage and possibly drive off the besiegers; he did, however, make a cavalry sortie on 31 August that cost the Russian 1,300 men, and the Ottomans 1,000. The Russians continued to send reinforcements to Plevna, and their army, now personally led by the Grand Duke swelled to 100,000 men. On 3 September Skobelev reduced the Turkish garrison guarding the Ottoman supply lines at Lovech before Osman could move out to relieve it. The Ottoman army organized the survivors of Lovech into 3 battalions for the Plevna defenses. Osman also received a reinforcement of 13 battalions, bringing his total strength to 30,000 men-the highest it would reach during the siege.

In August, Romanian troops led by General Alexandru Cernat crossed the Danube and entered the battle with 43,414 men. On 11 September the Russians and Romanians mounted a large-scale assault on Plevna. The Ottoman forces were dug in and equipped with German Krupp-manufactured steel breech-loading artillery and American-manufactured Winchester repeaters and Peabody-Martini rifles. For three hours they pushed back the waves of advancing Russians with superior firepower. Czar Alexander II and his brother Grand Duke Nicolas watched from a pavilion built on a hillside out of the line of fire. Skobelev took two southern redoubts. The Romanian 4th division led by General George Manu took the Grivitsa redoubt after four bloody assaults, personally assisted by Prince Carol. The next day, the Turks retook the southern redoubts, but could not dislodge the Romanians, who repelled three counterattacks. From the beginning of September, Russian and Romanian losses had amounted to roughly 20,000, while the Ottomans lost 5,000–6,000.

=== Fourth battle ===
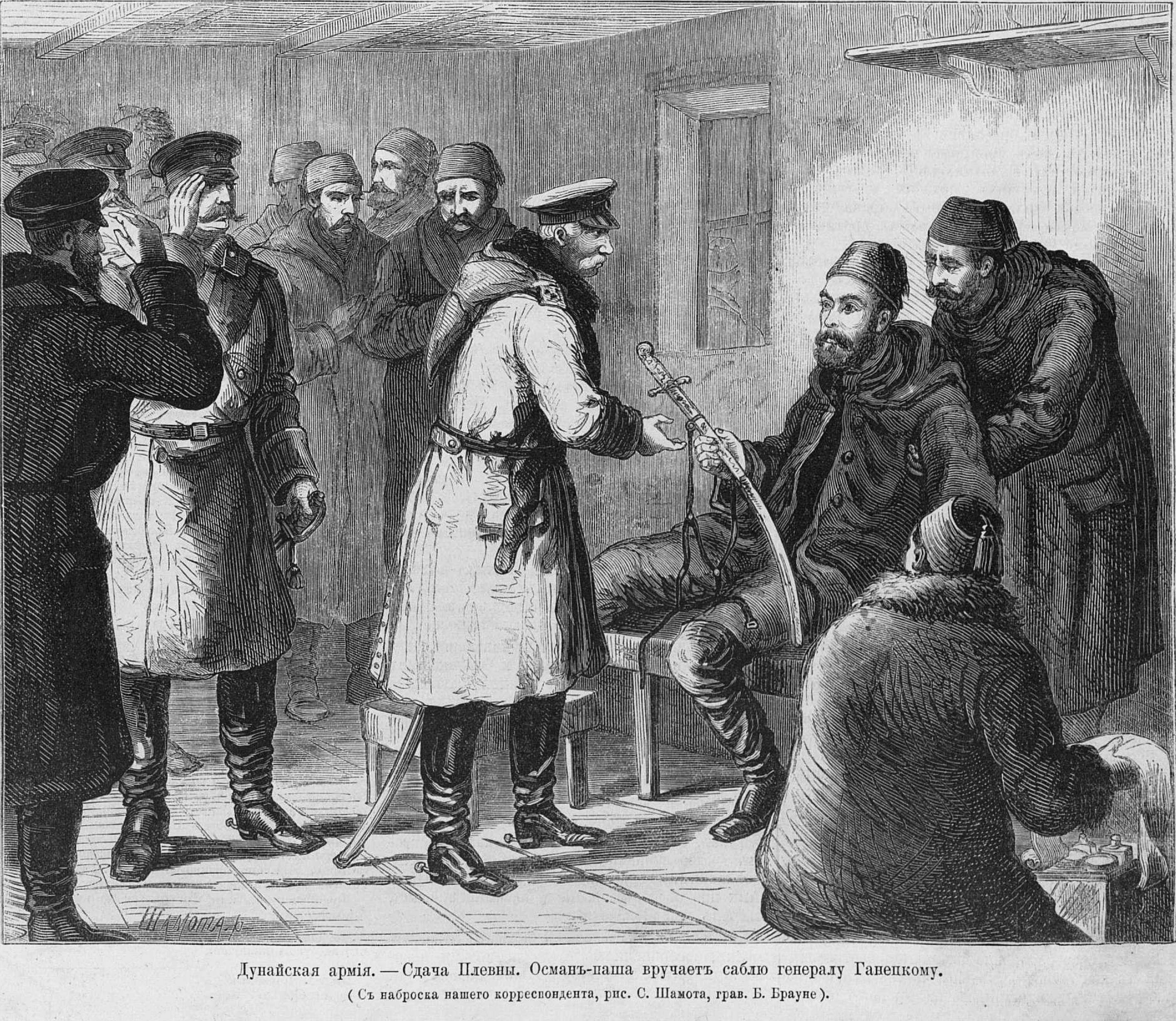
The wounded Osman Pasha surrenders (from a Russian book)

Growing Russian and Romanian casualties put a halt to frontal assaults. General Eduard Ivanovich Totleben arrived to oversee the conduct of the siege as the army chief of staff. Totleben had proven command experience in siege warfare, having gained renown for his defense of Sevastopol (1854–1855) during the Crimean War. He decided on a complete encirclement of the city and its defenders. Osman requested permission from his superiors to abandon Plevna and retreat, but the Ottoman high command would not allow him to do so. By 24 October the Russians and Romanians had closed the ring. Supplies began to run low in the city, and Osman finally made an attempt to break the Russian siege north-west, in the direction of Opanets. On 9 December the Ottoman forces silently emerged in the dead of night, threw bridges over and crossed the Vit River, attacked on a two-mile front, and broke through the first line of Russian trenches. Here they fought hand to hand and bayonet to bayonet, with, at first, little advantage to either side; however, outnumbering the Ottoman forces almost 5 to 1, the Russians and Romanians eventually drove them back across the Vit, wounding Osman in the process (he was hit in the leg by a stray bullet, which killed his horse beneath him). Rumours of his death created panic. After making a brief stand, the Ottoman forces found themselves driven back into the city, losing 5,000 men to the Russians' 2,000. The next day Osman surrendered the city, the garrison and his sword to Romanian Col. Mihail Cerchez. He was treated honorably, but his troops perished in the snow by the thousands as they straggled off into captivity.

== Aftermath ==
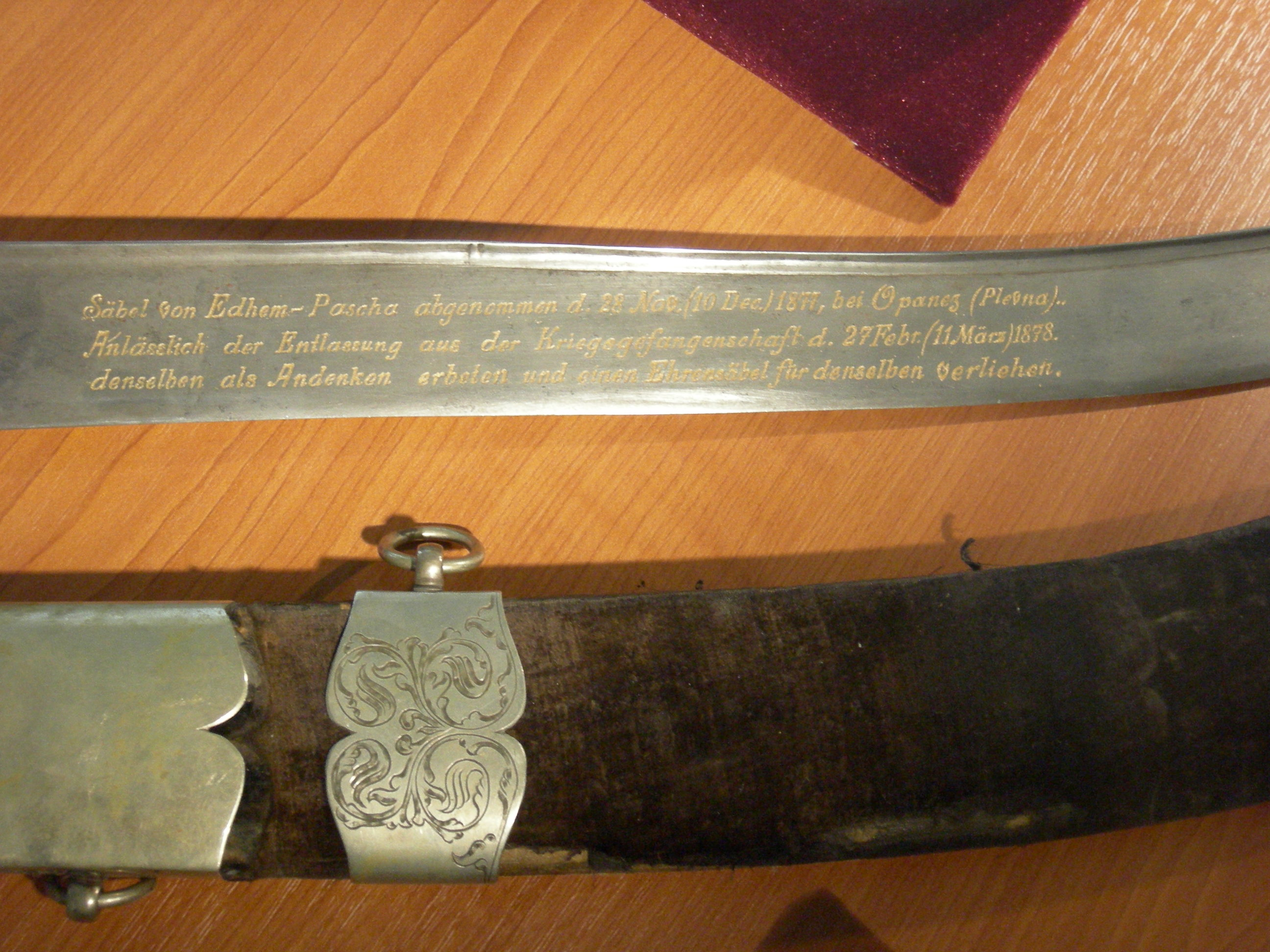
Sword surrendered by Edhem Pasha after the defeat at Plevna.

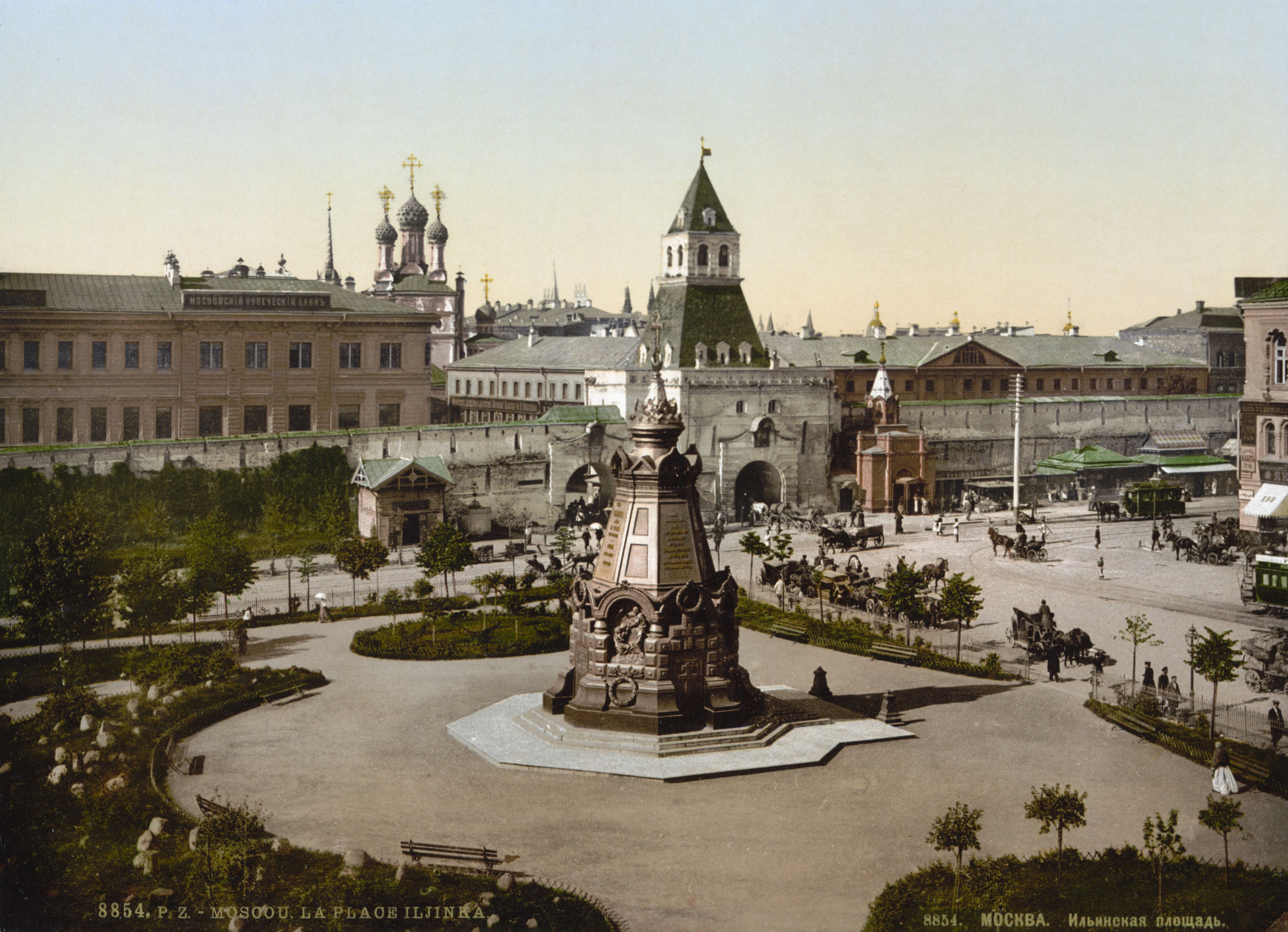
The Plevna Chapel on St Elijah's Square in Moscow, opened in 1882, commemorates the Russian soldiers who died in the Battle of Plevna.

The siege of Plevna seriously delayed the main Russian advance into Bulgaria, but its end freed up Russian reinforcements, which were sent to General Joseph Vladimirovich Gourko, who then decisively defeated the Ottoman forces in the Fourth battle of Shipka Pass. The siege was widely reported and followed by the public in Europe and beyond. Although the declining Ottoman Empire was by this time often regarded as "the sick man of Europe", its five-month-long resistance against a much larger army earned a degree of admiration, which may have contributed to the unsympathetic treatment of Russia at the Congress of Berlin.

According to the British diplomatic historian AJP Taylor:

Most battles confirm the way that things are going already; Plevna is one of the few engagements which changed the course of history. It is difficult to see how the Ottoman Empire could have survived in Europe... if the Russians and Romanians had reached Constantinople in July; probably it would have collapsed in Asia as well. Plevna... gave the Ottoman Empire another forty years of life.

The siege also signalled the introduction of the repeating rifle into European warfare. Both the Russian and the Ottoman armies were each using two types of infantry rifle at Plevna. Russian troops were largely armed with the old M1869 Krnka, a single-shot lifting breech block conversion of the muzzle loading M1857 rifled musket. It was soundly outperformed by the more modern single-shot Turkish Peabody-Martini rifles. At the time, the Russian Army was in process of reequipping with the more modern but still single-shot Berdan rifle. It became clear at Plevna that it was already obsolete while it was introduced and that it was outclassed by the Turkish Winchester repeaters. Reports of the heavy losses suffered by the Russian Army at the hands of the Turks at Plevna prompted militaries across Europe to start re-equipping themselves with repeating rifles or finding a way to convert their existing single-shot rifles into magazine-fed weapons.

== Legacy ==
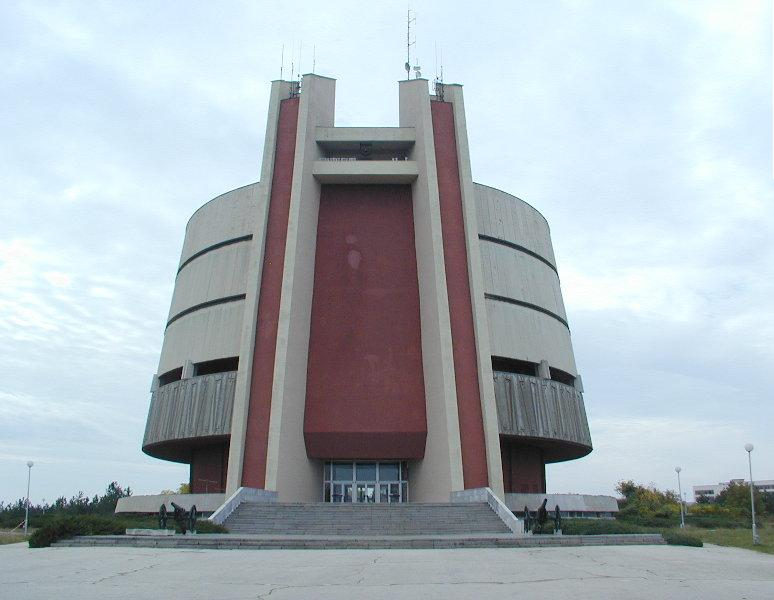
The Pleven Panorama from the outside

- A large new factory building, completed in 1877, of the Finlayson & Co cotton mill in Tampere, Finland was named Plevna commemorating the battle and the Guard of Finland that took part.
- The 10 December 1977 celebration of the 100th anniversary of the Liberation of Pleven from Turkish rule included the opening of the Pleven Panorama museum in Skobelev Park, in the area of the Kovanlak redoubt – the site of one of the heaviest battles of the third attack on Pleven.
- The city of Plevna, Montana in the United States was given its name by Bulgarian immigrants building the railroad there in honor of the battle of Plevna.
- In other countries, there are five cities and towns named after Plevna, and there are eighteen Plevna streets in Britain alone.
- The communities of Plevna, Ontario and Plevna, Missouri were named after the battle.

== In popular culture ==
- In Ulysses, Leopold Bloom's father-in-law, Major Brian Cooper Tweedy, is said to have made his military mark at Plevna.
- In Marie Nizet's French novella Le Vampire Capitaine (1879), the male Romanian protagonists take part in the Great Assault on September 11, some of whom die among the thousands of other Romanian soldiers there. The novella is highly critical of the Russian Empire, depicting Romanians as the empire's cannon fodder.
- The best-selling Russian detective novel The Turkish Gambit, the second book in the Erast Fandorin series, is set at the siege of Plevna. In 2005 a film of the same name was made. Book and film broadly follow the course of the actual battles, but attribute much of the blame for the Russian failures to a daring (fictional) Turkish spy.
- A famous Mehteran (Ottoman military band) piece "Osman Paşa Marşı" (Osman Pasha March) honors the courageous defense of the Plevna; and is one of the most well-known marches in Turkey.
- Under the Red Crescent by Charles Snodgrass Ryan, Australian Surgeon at the siege of Plevna, who later operated in the Gallipoli campaign and negotiated with his old friends for burial armistices.

== See also ==
- Battles of the Russo-Turkish War (1877–1878)
- Romanian War of Independence

== Bibliography ==
- This article incorporates text from a publication now in the public domain: John Henry Verinder Crowe (1911). "Plevna". In Chisholm, Hugh (ed.). Encyclopædia Britannica. Vol. 21 (11th ed.). Cambridge University Press. pp. 838–840, see page 838. "Battles of 1877...."
- Greene, F.V. (1879). The Russian Army and its Campaigns in Turkey. New York: D.Appleton and Company – via Internet Archive.
- Murray, Nicholas. The Rocky Road to the Great War: The Evolution of Trench Warfare to 1914. Potomac Books Inc. (an imprint of the University of Nebraska Press), 2013.
- Murray, Nicholas. "Plevna, Siege of (20 July – 10 December 1877)," Russia at War, Timothy Dowling (ed.), ABC-CLIO, (December 2014).
- Von Herbert, Captain Frederick William (1911). The Defence of Plevna; Written by One who Took Part in It. London: John Murray – via Internet Archive.
- Crane, Stephen (1901). "The Siege of Plevna". Great Battles of the World. London: Chapman & Hall Limited. pp. 33–49 – via Internet Archive.
- Compton's Home Library: Battles of the World CD-ROM
- George Marcu (coord.), Enciclopedia bătăliilor din istoria românilor, Editura Meronia, București 2011
- Azyassky, N. F. (22 February 2023). "Осада Плевны 1877". Great Russian Encyclopedia: scientific and educational portal.
