= Mikhail Skobelev =

Russian general (1843–1882)

Mikhail Dmitriyevich Skobelev
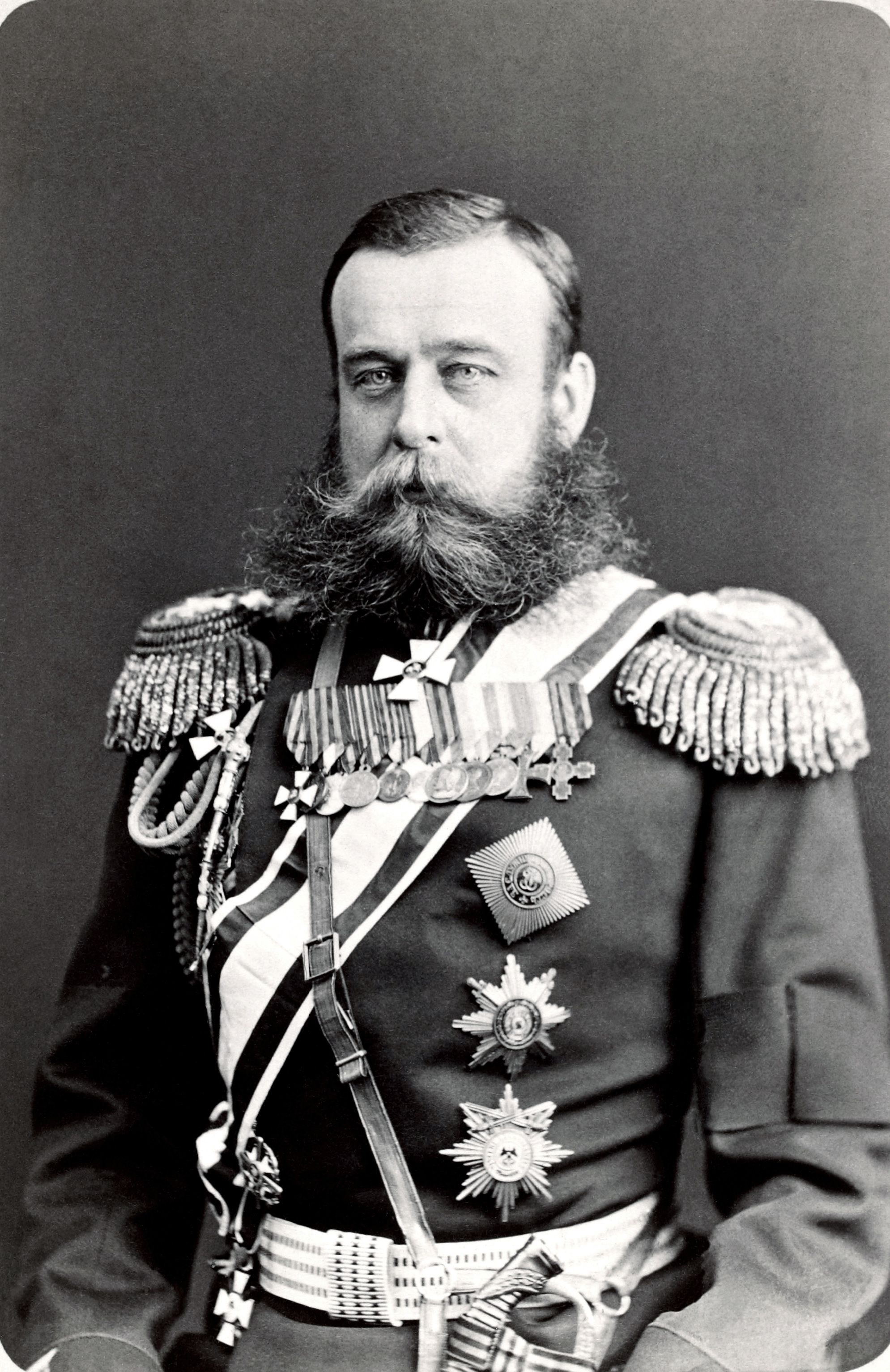
- Portrait by Sergey Lvovich Levitsky, 1881
- Born: 29 September 1843; Saint Petersburg, Russia
- Died: 7 July 1882 (aged 38); Moscow, Russia
- Military career
- Allegiance: Russia
- Branch: Imperial Russian Army
- Service years: 1861–1882
- Rank: General of the Infantry
- Nicknames: White General; White Pasha; Bloody Eyes
- Commands: 4th Army Corps (Russian Empire)
- Conflicts: January Uprising; Russian conquest of Central Asia; Khivan campaign of 1873; Kokand expedition of 1875–76; Battle of Makhram; Russo-Turkish War; Defense of Shipka; Harmanli massacre; Battle of Svistov; Siege of Plevna; Battle of Lovcha; Akhal Tekke expedition; Siege of Geok Tepe
- Awards: Order of St. George; Order of St. Vladimir; Order of Saint Anna

Mikhail Dmitriyevich Skobelev (Russian: Михаил Дмитриевич Скобелев; 29 September 1843 – 7 July 1882) was a Russian general who became famous for his conquest of Central Asia and for his heroism during the Russo-Turkish War of 1877–1878. Dressed in a white uniform and mounted on a white horse, and always in the thickest of the fray, he was known and adored by his soldiers as the "White General", and by the Turks as the "White Pasha". During a campaign in Khiva, his Turkmen opponents called him goz ganly or "Bloody Eyes".

British field marshal Bernard Montgomery assessed Skobelev as the world's "ablest single commander" between 1870 and 1914, and wrote of his "skilful and inspiring" leadership. Francis Vinton Greene also rated Skobelev highly.

== Early life ==
Skobelev was born in Saint Petersburg on 29 September 1843, at the Peter and Paul Fortress, where his grandfather was the commandant of the fortress. His mother was Russian philanthropist Olga Skobeleva, and his father was Russian general Dmitry Ivanovich Skobelev. His youngest sister Zinaida (1856–1899) was married to Eugen Maximilianovich, 5th Duke of Leuchtenberg. After graduating from the General Staff Academy as a staff officer, he was sent to Turkestan in 1868 and, with the exception of an interval of two years, during which he was on the staff of the grand duke Michael in the Caucasus, remained in Central Asia until 1877.

=== Conquest of Khiva ===
During the Khivan campaign of 1873 he commanded the advance guard of General Lomakin's column from Kinderly Bay, in the Caspian Sea, to join General Verevkin, from Orenburg, in the expedition to the Khanate of Khiva, and, after great suffering on the desert march, took a prominent part in the capture of the Khivan capital. Later, dressed as a Turkoman, he explored in a hostile country the route from Khiva to Igdy on the old riverbed of the Oxus.

In 1875, he was given an important command in the expedition against the Khanate of Kokand under General Konstantin Petrovich von Kaufmann, showing great capacity in the action of Makram, where he outmanoeuvered a greatly superior force and captured 58 guns, and in a night attack during the retreat from Andijan, routed a large force with a handful of cavalry.

== Later life ==
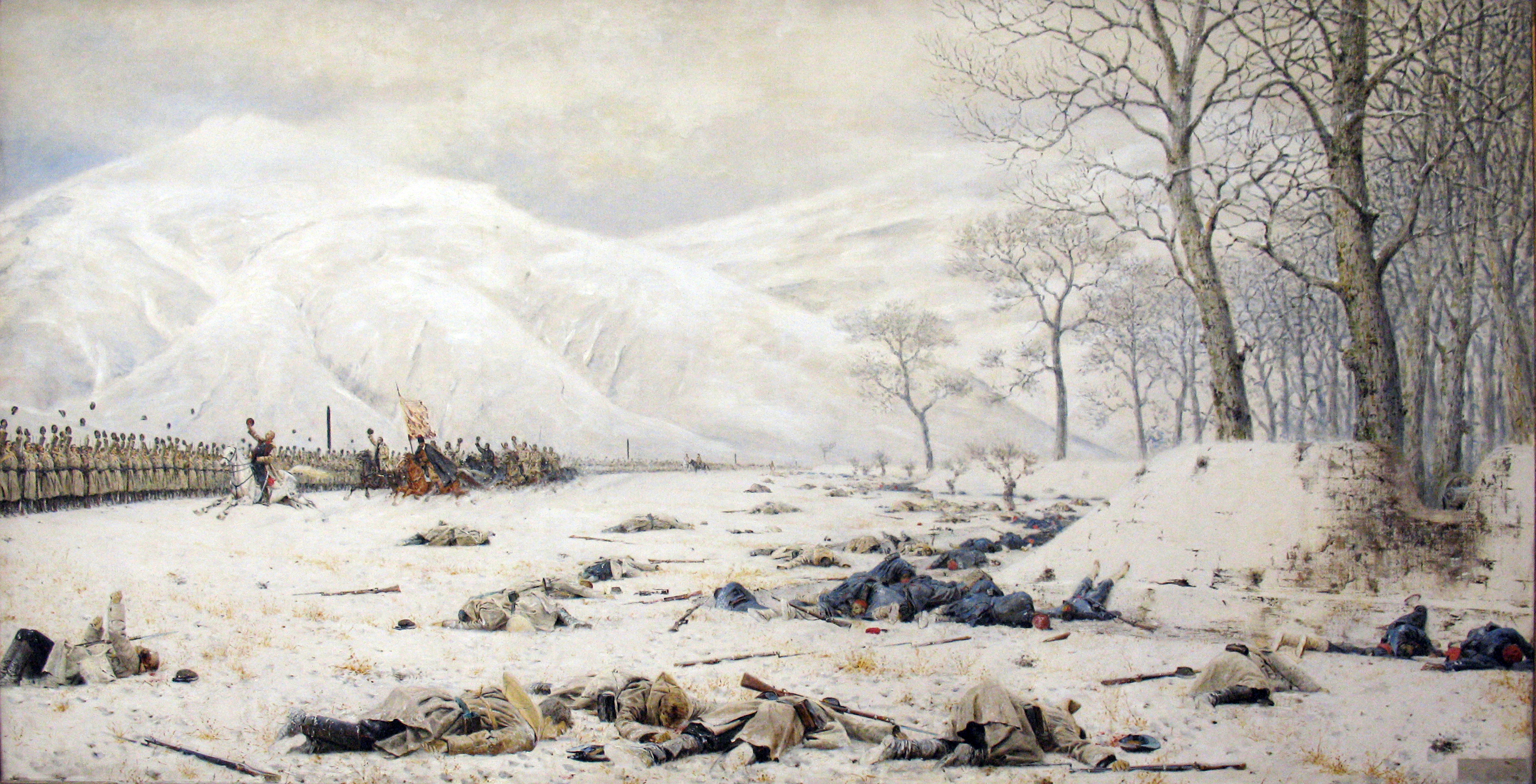
Skobelev in the battle of Shipka by Vasili Vereshchagin, 1883

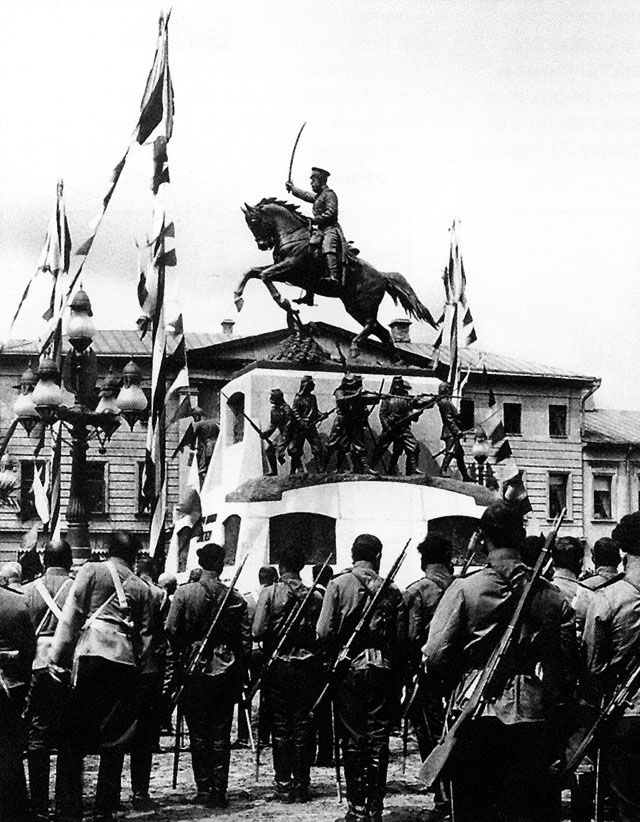
The Skobelev Monument in Moscow

=== Battle of Pleven ===
He was promoted to major general, decorated with the Order of Saint George, and appointed the first governor of the Fergana Oblast. In the Russo-Turkish War of 1877–1878, he crossed the Danube with the 8th Corps. Skobelev commanded the Caucasian Cossack Brigade in the attack of the Green Hills at the Second Battle of Plevna. An infantry division under Skobelev's command assailed the Grivitsa redoubt to the north. Schakofsky managed to take two redoubts, but by the end of the day the Ottoman forces succeeded in repulsing all the attacks and retaking lost ground. Russian losses amounted to 7,300, and the Ottomans' to 2,000.

At the capture of Lovetch on 3 September, the general distinguished himself again in desperate fighting on the Green Hills during the Third Battle of Plevna in which Skobelev took two southern redoubts. The Romanian 4th division, led by General George Manu, took the Grivitsa redoubt after four bloody assaults, personally assisted by Prince Carol. The next day the Turks retook the southern redoubts, but could not dislodge the Romanians, who repelled three counterattacks. From the beginning of September, Russian losses had amounted to roughly 20,000, while the Ottomans lost 5,000.

After being promoted to the rank of lieutenant general and given the command of the 16th Division, he took part in the investment of Pleven and also in the fight of 9 December, when Osman Pasha surrendered, with his army. In January 1878 he crossed the Balkans in a severe snowstorm, defeating the Turks at Sheynovo, near Shipka and capturing 36,000 men and 90 guns.

=== Geok Tepe ===
Skobelev returned to Turkestan after the war, and in 1880 and 1881 further distinguished himself by retrieving the disasters inflicted by the Tekke Turkomans: following the Siege of Geok Tepe, it was stormed, the general captured the fort. Around 8,000 Turkmen soldiers and civilians, including women and children, were slaughtered in a bloodbath in their flight, along with an additional 6,500 who died inside the fortress. The Russians' massacre included all Turkmen males in the fortress who had not escaped, but they spared some 5,000 women and children and freed 600 Persian slaves. The defeat at Geok Tepe and the following slaughter broke the Turkmen resistance and decided the fate of Transcaspia, which was annexed to the Russian Empire. The great slaughter cowed the Akhal-Tekke country into submission. Skobelev was removed from his command because of the massacre. He was advancing on Ashkhabad and Kalat i-Nadiri when he was disavowed and recalled to Moscow. He was given the command at Minsk. The official reason for his transfer to Europe was to appease European public opinion over the slaughter at Geok Tepe. Some have suggested that he was suffering from delusions of grandeur and showing signs of political ambition.

In the last years of his life, Skobelev engaged actively in politics, supporting the ideas of Russian nationalism and militant Pan-Slavism. He has also been credited as one of the earliest promoters of the concept "Russia for Russians". At the beginning of 1882, he made speeches in Paris and in Moscow, predicting desperate strife between Slavs and Germans. He was at once recalled to St Petersburg.

== Death ==
Skobelev was staying at the Hotel Dusseaux in Moscow on 7 July 1882 when, by official account, he died suddenly of a heart attack.

While, actually, he died of exhaustion in Moscow's Angleterre Hotel, a brothel, in a suite of a German prostitute named Charlotte Altenrose (or, by some accounts, Altenroz, Altenroze, also known as "Eleanor", "Wanda", and "Rosa".) His mistress went away and called a local street sweeper, who identified the deceased, and called police. Police, upon arrival pushed onlookers out of the scene, and transported Skobelev's dead body back into the Hotel Dusseaux. Coroner cited "paralysis of heart and lungs". This story immediately became a taboo in Russia with only few accounts testified about the real circumstances surrounding his death. Frank Harris described in his memoirs how a Russian officer told him that Skobelev died in a brothel. This scenario is also alluded to in Aleksander Kuprin's short story Temptation.

Alexander III wrote: "His loss to the Russian army is one it is hard to replace, and it must be deeply lamented by all true soldiers. It is sad, very sad, to lose men so useful and so devoted to their mission." This became especially evident during the Russo-Japanese War of 1904–1905. The Russian generals commanding in that war were men of Skobelev's generation, but none of them had his military genius or charisma.

== Legacy ==
After Skobelev's death, in Moscow a monument was raised in his honour on a major square on Tverskaya Street (across from the city hall, where today stands the statue of Yuri Dolgorukiy, the founder of Moscow), which was given his name, and the town of Fergana in Uzbekistan was renamed Skobelev.

Today, his name still lives, even beyond the Russian Federation: shortly after the end of the Turkish War of 1877, the Bulgarians constructed a park in Pleven, Skobelev Park, on one of the hills where the major battles for the city took place. The park is also a location of the Panorama Pleven's Epopee 1877 memorial, where in one of the scenes of the gigantic 360-degree panoramic painting the White General is displayed charging with his horse and bare sword, leading the infantry Russian attack on the Turkish positions. A central boulevard in Sofia, the capital city of Bulgaria, also bears Mikhail Dmitriyevich Skobelev's name.

Shortly after the entrance of the park, the bust of the famous general can be seen, watching over the city. The park contains memorials with the names of the Russian and Romanian soldiers that died for the liberation of Pleven, and is decorated with non-functional arms donated by Russia: cannons, cannonballs, Gatling guns, rifles, and bayonets.

In the 1955 Soviet-Bulgarian war epic Heroes of Shipka, Skobelev, played by Yevgeny Samoylov, is portrayed as one of the film's main heroes.

== Honours and awards ==
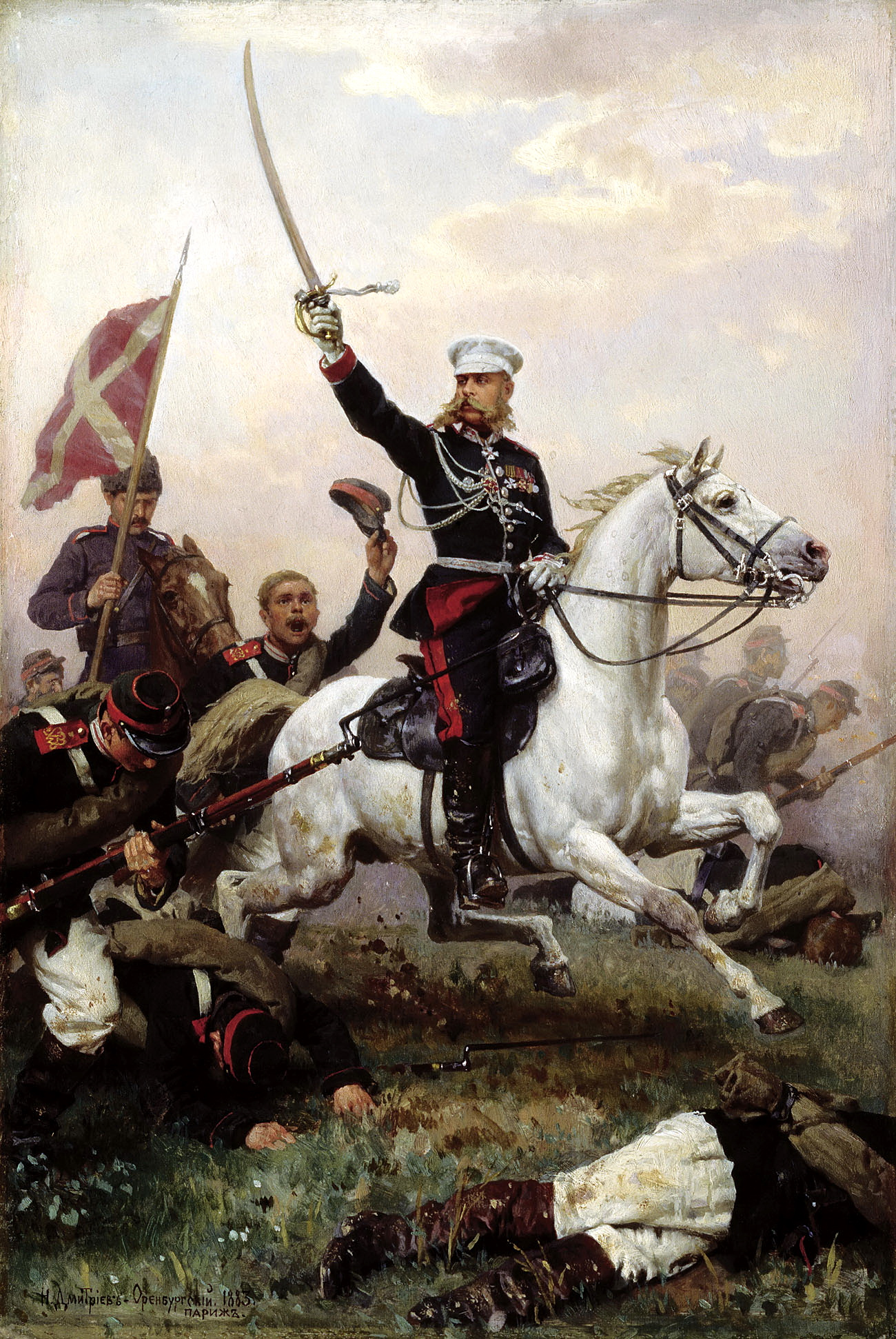
Nikolai Dmitriev-Orenburgsky. General Skobelev on the Horse (1883)

Russian

- Order of St. Stanislaus, 1st class with swords
- Order of St. Anna. 1st and 4th classes
- Order of St. George, 2nd, 3rd and 4th classes
- Order of St. Vladimir, 3rd class with swords
- Gold Sword for Bravery
- Gold Sword for Bravery with diamonds
- Gold Sword for Bravery with diamonds for the transition of the Balkans

Foreign

- Order of the Red Eagle, 1st and 2nd class with swords (Prussia)
- Pour le Mérite (Prussia)
- Grand Cross of the Order of the Cross of Takovo (Serbia)
- Order of the Cross of Takovo with swords (Serbia)
- Serbian Gold Medal for bravery;
- Montenegrin Medal
- Romanian Medal for military valour
