= Skobelev Park =

Park in Pleven, Bulgaria

Coordinates: 43°23′55″N 24°36′22″E

Skobelev Park (Скобелев парк) is a museum park in the vicinity of Pleven, Bulgaria. It was built between 1904 and 1907 on the very battlefield of the Siege of Plevna during the Russo-Turkish War of 1877-78, specifically the third assault of General Mikhail Skobelev's detachment between 30 August and 11 September 1877.

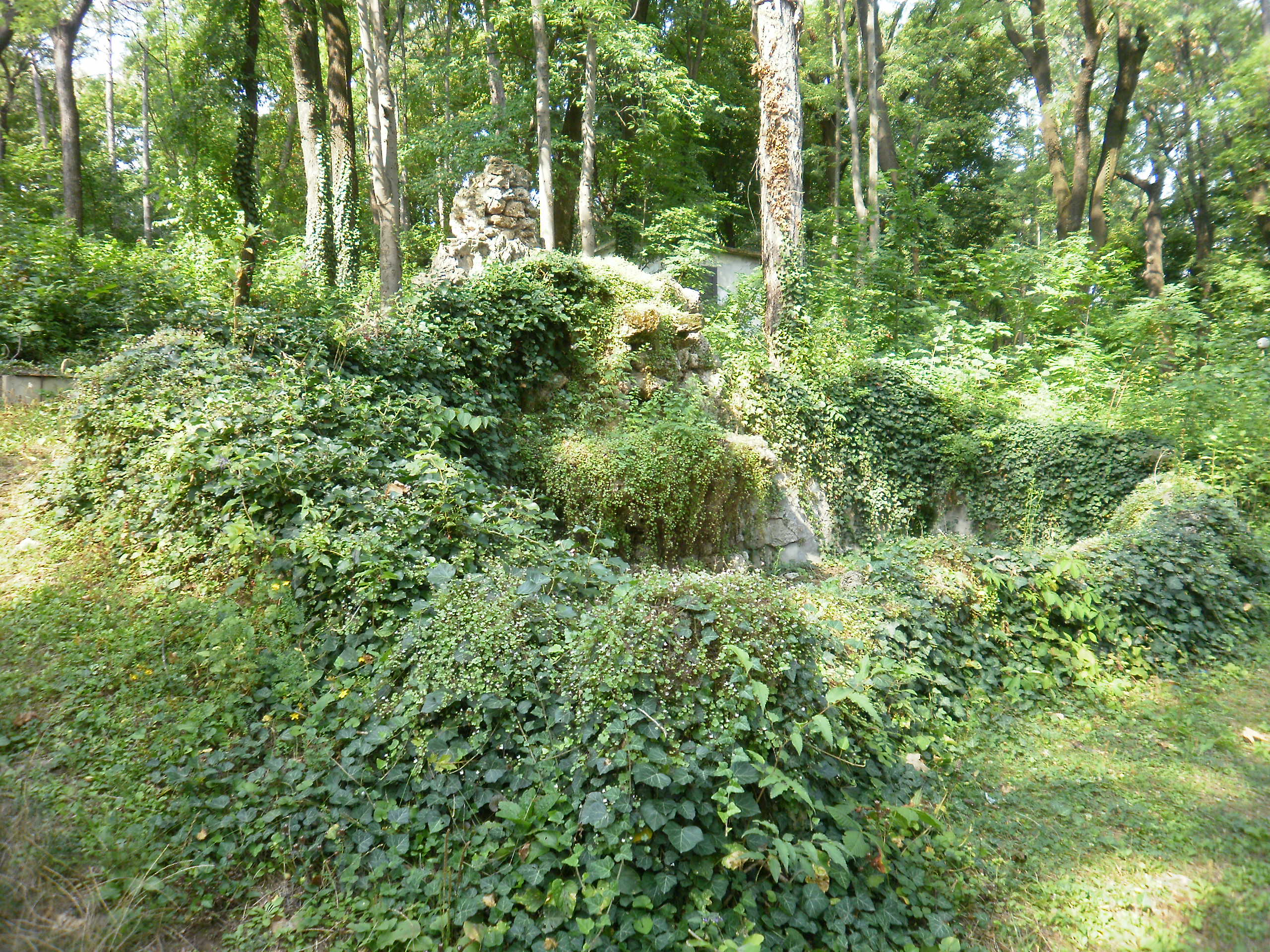

The park is located in a valley called Martva dolina (Мъртва долина, "Dead Valley") because of the 6,500 killed and injured Russian and Romanian soldiers during the battle. Their remains are stored in nine common graves and an ossuary. Dozens of Russian cannons from the war are arranged as batteries in the park, which is a favoured place for walks by the residents of Pleven.

The Pleven Panorama, another landmark dedicated to the events of the Siege of Plevna, is located in Skobelev Park.
