= Grivitsa =

Village in Pleven, Bulgaria

Coordinates: 43°25′N 24°42′E

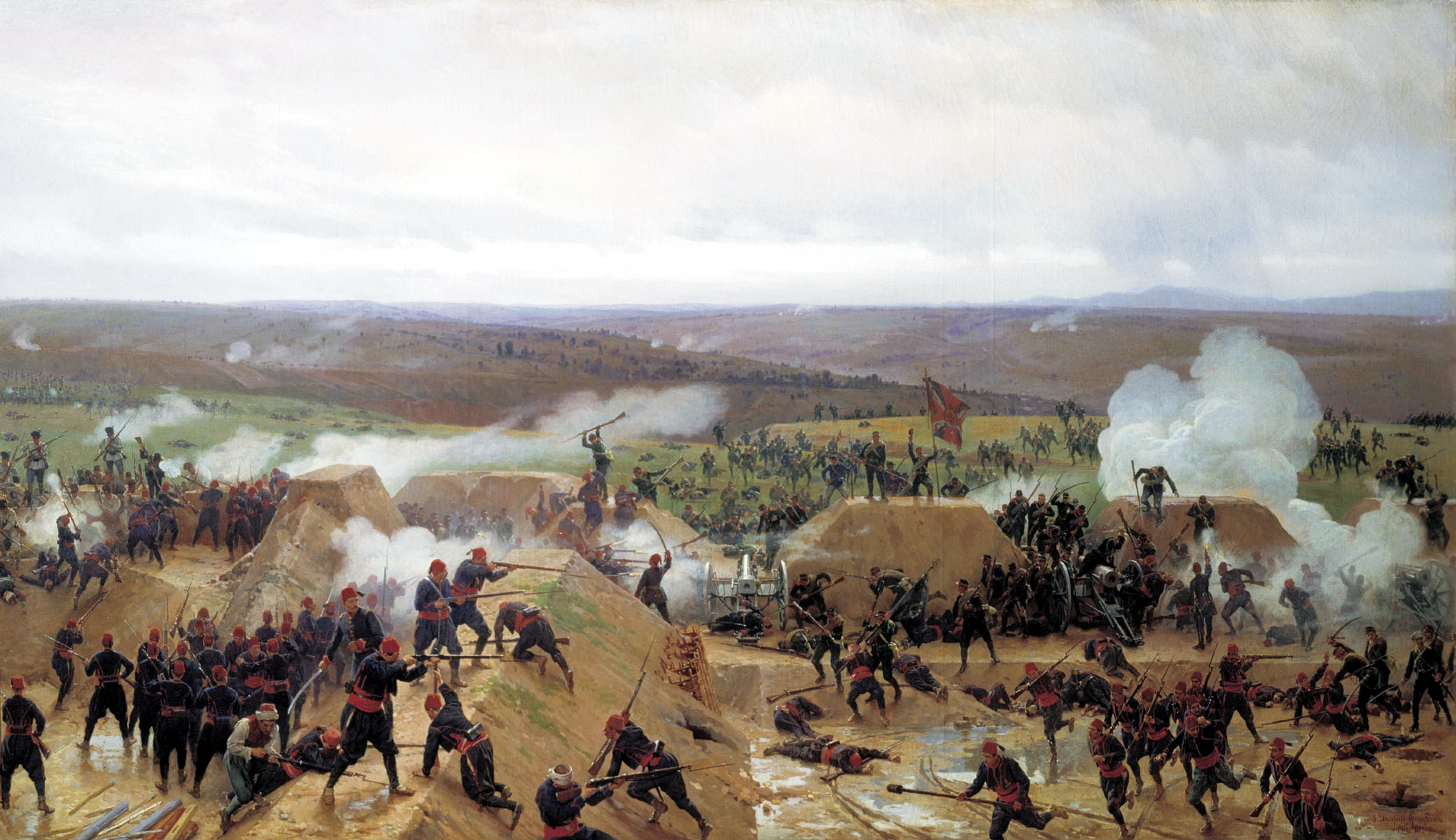
Capturing of the Grivitsa redoubt during the Russo-Turkish War of 1877–1878

Grivitsa (Bulgarian: Гривица, pronounced [ˈɡrivit͡sɐ]; also transliterated as Grivitza or Grivica) is a village in Pleven Municipality, Pleven Province, central northern Bulgaria. It is primarily known as the site of one of the key engagements in the Siege of Plevna during the Russo-Turkish War of 1877–1878.

== Geography ==
Located 9 kilometres east of Pleven at an average 208 metres above sea level and lying in the hilly basin of the Vit River, Grivitsa has a population of 1,778 as of December 2009. The railway line connecting Sofia to Varna and Rousse runs through the village, as well as the main road from Pleven to Rousse, Nikopol and Pordim. The highest point of the Central Danubian Plain, the 304-metre-high Sredni vrah (Bulgarian: Средни връх, "Middle Peak") is just to the east of the village. The soil is rich in clay but suitable for agriculture. The area is also rich in limestone and quarries for its extraction have been built in several places.

== History ==
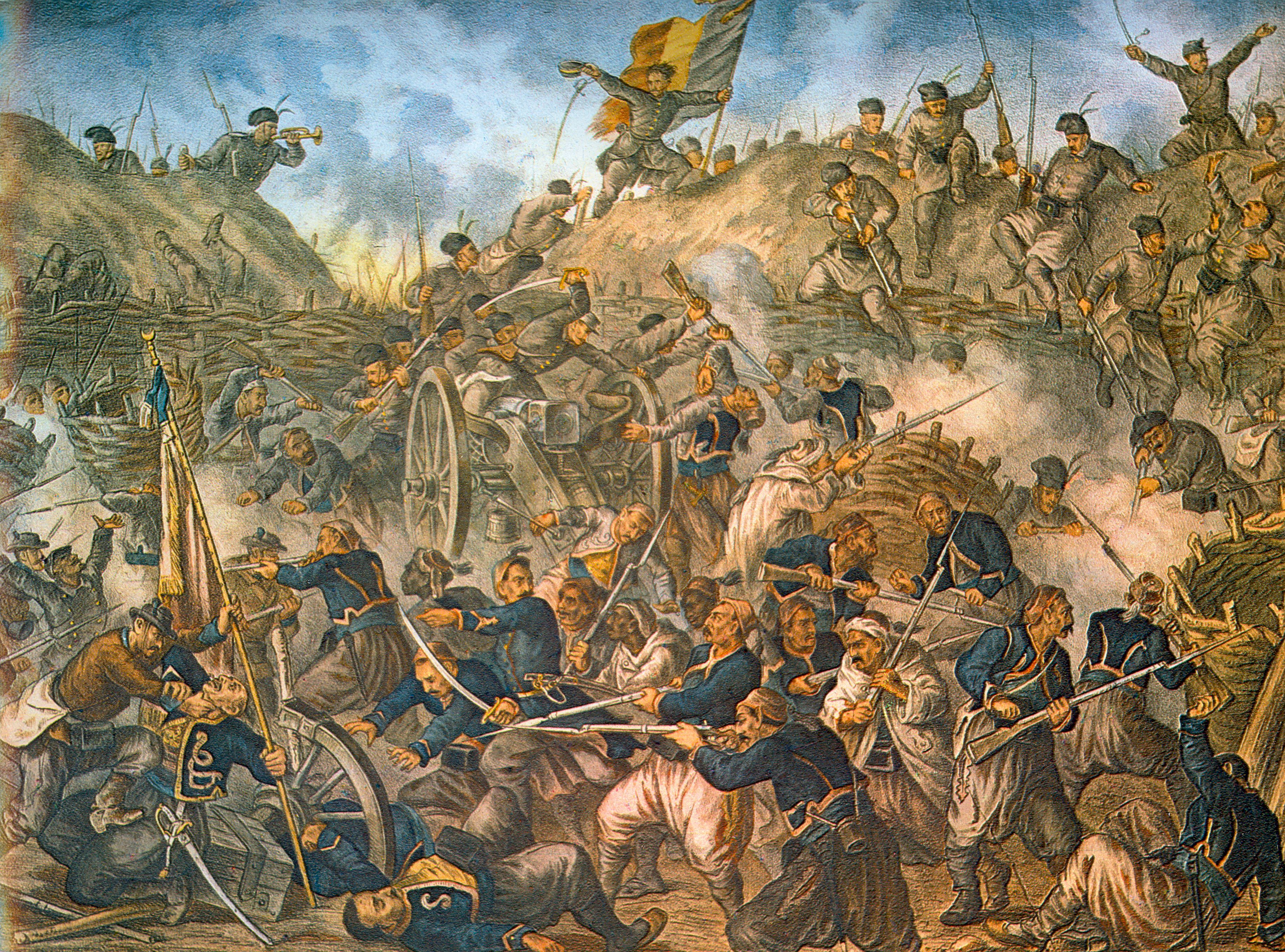
Romanian troops storming the Grivitsa redoubt during the Russo-Turkish War of 1877–1878

The village's location has shifted several times, with the earliest known settlement being in the Ezero area to the south of modern Grivitsa, identified with the time after the Ottoman conquest of Bulgaria (14th-15th century). The plague forced the locals to move to the present location. The legend surrounding the image's name asserts that the area between Trastenik and Slavyanovo, including Grivitsa, was the feud (vakıf) of an Ottoman noble known as Trastenik Pasha, who was an avid dove- and bee-keeper. He is thought to have built a dove-cot and an apiary in the Rogultsi area near today's Grivitsa, and bred wood pigeons (known as гривяк, grivyak in Bulgarian). Gradually, the locals came to be known as grivatsi and the village as Grivitsa.

During the Russo-Turkish War of 1877–1878, Grivitsa was the location of an important Ottoman position featuring several redoubts and acting as part of the defensive fortifications of Pleven. The Battle of Grivitsa was part of the prolonged Siege of Plevna which resulted in the death of many Russian and particularly Romanian soldiers: the losses of the Romanian units in this battle were the largest for the entire war.

Grivitsa has a school built in 1916, as well as a park arranged in 1956 and a museum opened in 1967, both commemorating the events of 1877. A Romanian mausoleum with an ossuary was built in 1892–1897 using funds collected by the Romanian people and opened in 1902. In honour of the battle, several communes and neighbourhoods in Romania, as well as the Romanian NMS Grivița, bear the name Grivița, a Romanian rendition of the village's name.
